= Biodiversity of Cape Town =

Diversity of the natural environment of Cape Town

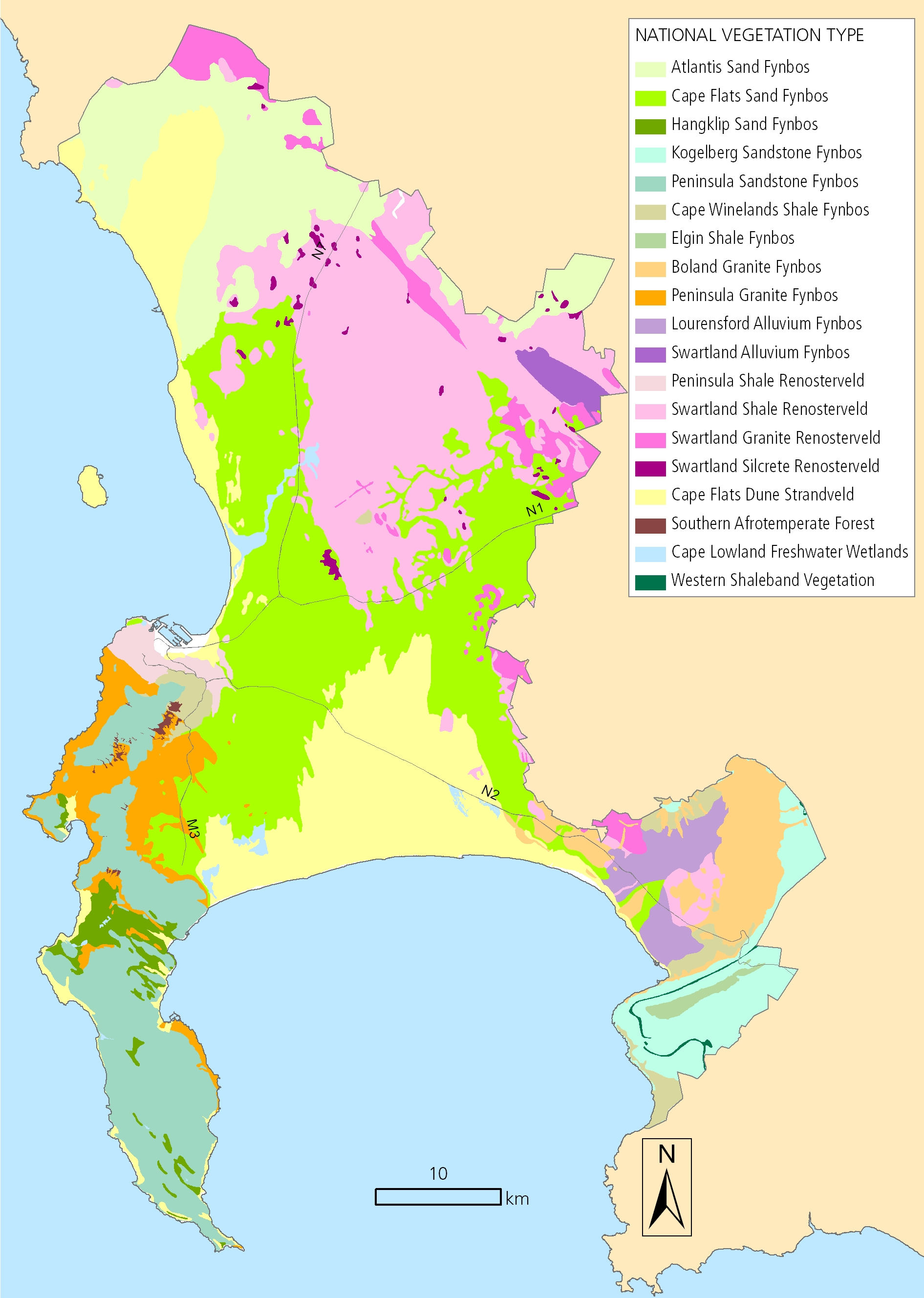
Cape Town's original vegetation types

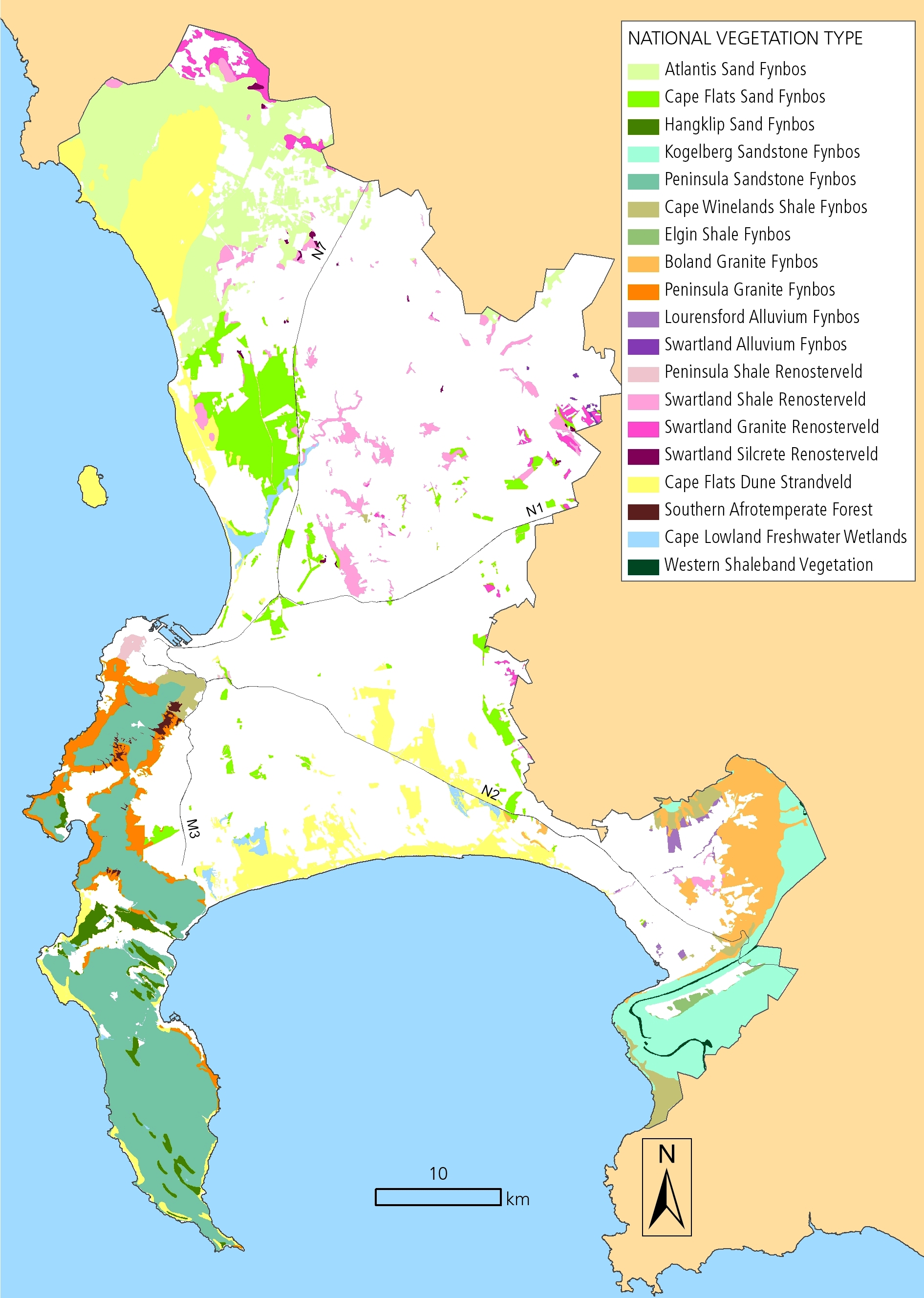
Cape Town's surviving vegetation types

The biodiversity of Cape Town is the variety and variability of life within the City of Cape Town. The terrestrial vegetation is particularly diverse and much of it is endemic to the city and its vicinity. Terrestrial and freshwater animals are heavily impacted by urban development and habitat degradation. Marine life of the waters immediately adjacent to the city along the Cape Peninsula and in False Bay is also diverse, and while also impacted by human activity, the habitats are relatively intact.

== Floristic region (phytochorion) ==
The City of Cape Town lies within the Cape Floristic Kingdom, by far the smallest and most diverse of the earth's six floristic kingdoms, an area of extraordinarily high diversity and endemism, and home to over 9,000 vascular plant species, of which 69 percent are endemic. Much of this diversity is associated with the fynbos biome, a Mediterranean-type, fire-prone shrubland. The economical worth of fynbos biodiversity, based on harvests of fynbos products (e.g. wildflowers) and eco-tourism, is estimated to be in the region of R77 million a year. Thus, it is clear that the Cape Floristic Region has both economic and intrinsic biological value as a biodiversity hotspot.

== Vegetation types ==
Cape Town is located within a Conservation International biodiversity hotspot and is home to 19 distinct vegetation types. (This enormous variety is mainly because the city is located at the convergence point of many soil types and microclimates.) These 19 vegetation types are mostly restricted to unusually small areas, and several are completely endemic to the city – occurring nowhere else in the world. Vegetation types include the following.

- Atlantis Sand Fynbos
- Boland Granite Fynbos
- Cape Flats Dune Strandveld
- Cape Flats Sand Fynbos
- Cape Winelands Shale Fynbos
- Hangklip Sand Fynbos
- Kogelberg Sandstone Fynbos
- Lourensford Alluvium Fynbos
- Peninsula Granite Fynbos
- Peninsula Sandstone Fynbos
- Peninsula Shale Renosterveld
- Swartland Alluvium Fynbos
- Swartland Alluvium Renosterveld
- Swartland Granite Renosterveld
- Swartland Shale Renosterveld
- Swartland Silcrete Renosterveld
- Southern Afrotemperate Forest
- Cape Lowland Freshwater Wetland

== Endemism ==
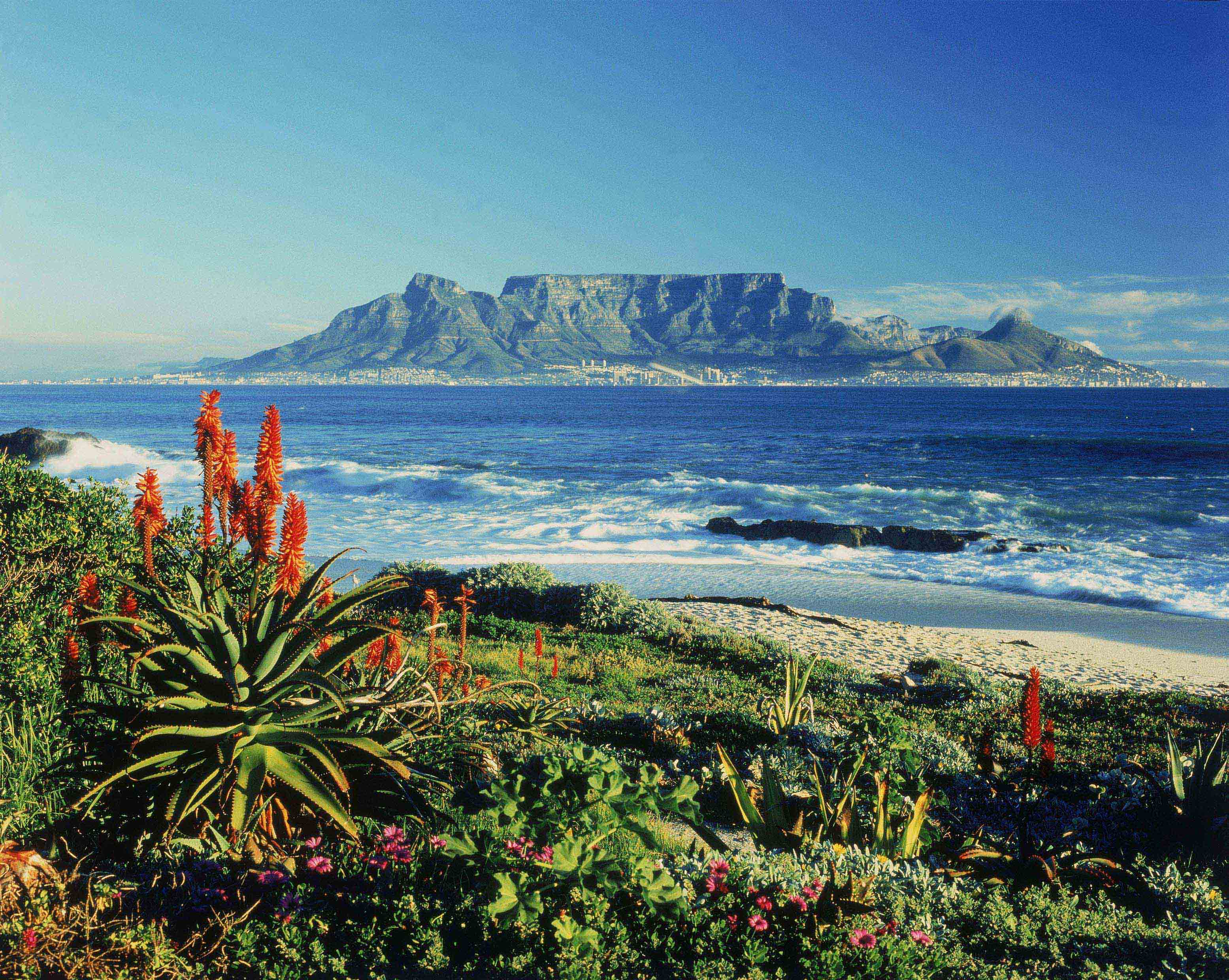
Table Mountain as seen from Bloubergstrand. Some examples of the region's plant biodiversity are seen in the foreground.

Of the thousands of plant species that are indigenous to Cape Town, 190 are known to be endemic. In addition, there are over a hundred animal species that are restricted to the city. Endemic plant species include the following.

Cape Peninsula endemics

- Acerentulus gracilis
- Agathosma lanceolata (honey buchu)
- Agathosma pulchella (skunk buchu)
- Algophilus lathridoides (Table Mountain hairy crawling water beetle)
- Allocotocerus mixtus (Table Mountain water scavenger beetle)
- Aloiampelos commixta (Table Mountain aloe)
- Anaxeton arborescens
- Anisocampa munroi
- Anopsobius patagonicus
- Argyrobothrus velocipes
- Argyrocupha (Trimenia) malagrida malagrida (Table Mountain copper)
- Arion intermedius
- Aristea pauciflora (unistem aristea)
- Arthroleptella lightfootii (Cape Peninsula moss frog)
- Aspalathus barbata (bearded gorse)
- Aspalathus borboniifolia (hairy-ridge gorse)
- Aspalathus capensis (Cape gorse)
- Aspalathus capitata (heady gorse)
- Aspalathus chenopoda subsp chenopoda
- Aspalathus incurva (incurved gorse)
- Aspalathus variegata (Cape Flats gorse)
- Athanasia capitata (unihead kanniedood)
- Aulonogyrus (Afrogyrus) sp. undescribed
- Australutica normanlarseni
- Austrolimnophila thornei
- Austromontia capensis
- Bidessus mundulus
- Bobartia gladiata subsp major (spearleaf laces)
- Bonaspeia cristata
- Brachysiphon fucatus (Peninsula sissies)
- Caffrolix cyclopia
- Caffrolix petreulis
- Calopsis gracilis (small tangle reed)
- Capeolix picturatus
- Caplopa sordida
- Cephalelus ivyae (Peninsula restio leafhopper)
- Ceramontia tabulae (Table Mountain trinon harvestman)
- Chersastus pococki
- Chersastus promontorius
- Cliffortia carinata (crown climbers-friend)
- Cliffortia discolor (summit climbers-friend)
- Cliffortia ericifolia (erica-leaf climbers-friend)
- Cliffortia theodori-friesii var. theodori-friesii (climbers-friend 1)
- Colophon westwoodi (Peninsula stag beetle)
- Cotula myriophylloides (watergrass button)
- Crassula capensis var. promontorii (cliff Cape snowdrop)
- Crozetulus scutatus (cave orb-web spider)
- Cryptadaeum capense
- Cryptops stupendus (Peninsula cave millipede)
- Ctenolepisma tenebrans (Peninsula silverfish)
- Cthoniella cavernicola (Peninsula cave pseudoscorpion)
- Cyclopia galioides (Peninsula honeybush)
- Cyclopia latifolia (broad-leaf honeybush)
- Cylichnogaster lawrencei
- Cylindroiulus truncorum
- Cytinus capensis (Peninsula bloodcup)
- Diastella divaricata subsp divaricata (Peninsula silkypuff)
- Diores capensis
- Diores cognatus
- Diploexochus tabularis
- Dipteretrum brinckae (Brinks Peninsula cockroach)
- Disa ecalcarata (spurless disa)
- Disa nubigena (cloud disa)
- Disa obtusa subsp. obtusa
- Disa uniflora (pride of Table Mountain)
- Dolichopeza barnardi
- Dolichopeza peringueyi
- Drosanthemum stokoei (searock dewfig)
- Drosera cuneifolia (Peninsula sundew)
- Elegia intermedia (scratchy golden reed)
- Eleocharis lepta (Peninsula water sedge)
- Eodrilus arelinus
- Eodrilus drygaskii
- Eodrilus kirstenboschensis
- Eodrilus palustris
- Eodrilus purcellii
- Eodrilus riebeekanus
- Eodrilus simonianus
- Eodrilus tormentosus
- Erepsia forficata (rock everfig)
- Erica abietina subsp. abietina (red heath)
- Erica abietina subsp. atrorosea (wine-red heath)
- Erica abietina subsp. constantiana (Constantia heath)
- Erica abietina subsp. diabolis (devils heath)
- Erica amoena (delightful heath)
- Erica annectens (cliff-hanger heath)
- Erica baccans (berry heath)
- Erica capensis (Cape heath)
- Erica caterviflora var. caterviflora (bunch heath)
- Erica caterviflora var. glabrata (troop heath)
- Erica clavisepala (club heath)
- Erica cyrilliflora (red hill heath)
- Erica depressa (dwarf heath)
- Erica diosmifolia (buchu-leaf heath 2)
- Erica eburnea (ivory heath)
- Erica empetrina (crowberry heath)
- Erica fairii (fairy heath)
- Erica fontana (fountain heath)
- Erica haematocodon (bloodbell heath)
- Erica halicacaba (gooseberry heath)
- Erica heleogena (marsh heath)
- Erica hirtiflora var. hirtiflora (hairy-flower heath)
- Erica limosa (mud heath)
- Erica mammosa subsp gilva (Peninsula ninepin heath)
- Erica margaritacea (pearl heath)
- Erica marifolia (flat-leaf heath)
- Erica mollis (soft heath)
- Erica nevillei (rock heath)
- Erica oxycoccifolia (cranberry heath)
- Erica paludicola (wiry heath)
- Erica physodes (bladder heath)
- Erica pilulifera (fine-hair heath)
- Erica planifolia (gland heath)
- Erica pyramidalis (pyramid heath)
- Erica pyxidiflora (box heath)
- Erica quadrisulcata (four-grooved heath)
- Erica sociorum (partner heath)
- Erica subcapitata (pinhead heath)
- Erica thimifolia (carpet heath)
- Erica turgida (showy heath)
- Erica urna-viridis (bottle-green heath)
- Erica verticillata (whorled heath)
- Eupolystoma anterorchis (western leopard toad flatworm)
- Eurytion brevis
- Eurytion trichopus
- Ficinia anceps (vleibiessie)
- Ficinia fastigiata (vleibiessie)
- Ficinia micrantha (smallflower vleibiessie)
- Galaxias zebratus Southern Peninsula population
- Geissorhiza bonaspei (Goodhope satinflower)
- Geissorhiza tabularis (Table Mountain satinflower)
- Gerbera wrightii
- Gethyllis kaapensis (Peninsula kukumakranka)
- Gladiolus aureus (golden lady)
- Gladiolus bonaspei (Good Hope lady)
- Gladiolus monticola (mountain lady)
- Gladiolus ornatus (ornate lady)
- Gladiolus vigilans (plain painted lady)
- Gnidia parvula (poor saffronbush)
- Griswoldia ceratogyna
- Harpactirella treleaveni (Table Mountain golden baboon spider)
- Harpethrix caeca (Peninsula cave millipede)
- Hekelus episimus
- Heleophryne rosei (Table Mountain ghost frog)
- Helichrysum fruticans
- Helichrysum grandiflorum
- Helictotrichon quinquesetum (Peninsula oats)
- Heliophila cinerea
- Heliophila promontorii
- Heliophila tabularis (Table Mountain sporrie)
- Hermannia micrantha (small-flowered dolls-rose)
- Herophydrus capensis
- Heterocerus capensis
- Hoplophoropyga unicolor (dull Peninsula cockroach)
- Idiognaphomyia ignava
- Indigofera candolleana (denseleaf indigo)
- Indigofera filiformis (long-stalk indigo)
- Indigofera mauritanica (discolorous indigo)
- Indigofera sp. nov. aff. gracilis (slender indigo)
- Isolepis bulbifera (green-and-red isolepis)
- Japyx barnardi var. relata
- Japyx gilli
- Julomorpha compacta
- Julomorpha hilaris
- Julomorpha ignava
- Kaapia darwini
- Lachenalia capensis (Cape viooltjie)
- Lampranthus curvifolius (Bakoven brightfig)
- Lampranthus multiradiatus (brilliant brightfig)
- Lampranthus promontorii (rock brightfig)
- Lampranthus stenus (narrow brightfig)
- Lamyctopristus granulosus
- Lamyctopristus validus
- Larifuga capensis
- Larifuga montana
- Lawrencella inermis
- Leielmis sp. undescribed
- Lephthyphantes rimicola (cave sheet-web spider)
- Lepidium capense (Cape pepperweed)
- Leptocerus tabularis (Peninsula long-horn caddisfly)
- Leucadendron grandiflorum (Wynberg conebush)
- Leucadendron macowanii (acacia-leaf conebush)
- Leucadendron strobilinum (Peninsula conebush)
- Leucospermum conocarpodendron subsp. conocarpodendron (grey tree pincushion)
- Liparia graminifolia (grass mountain pea)
- Liparia laevigata (tall mountain pea)
- Liparia parva (small mountain dahlia)
- Lobelia boivinii (creeping lobelia)
- Lobelia eckloniana (Ecklons lobelia)
- Longurio chionoides
- Longurio micropteryx
- Machiloides leonis
- Machiloides mensarius
- Machiloides obsotetus
- Machiloides silvestrii
- Macrosteles sexnotatus
- Malaika longipes (cave hackle-mesh spider)
- Marioniscus spatulifrons
- Mesoceration capense
- Mesoceration concessum
- Meta sp. nov.
- Metalasia compacta (compact blombos)
- Metalasia divergens subsp. divergens
- Metalasia divergens subsp. fusca
- Micradaeum rugosum
- Microdon nitidus (silver catstailbush)
- Mimetes fimbriifolius (fringed pagoda)
- Moggeridgea teresae (Peninsula bagnest spider)
- Molopopterus struthiolus
- Montadaeum purcelli
- Moraea aristata (blue-eye uintjie)
- Morella diversifolia (Peninsula waxberry)
- Muraltia acipetala (spiny purple-gorse)
- Muraltia brachypetala (sessile purple-gorse)
- Muraltia comptonii (spiny-tip purple-gorse)
- Muraltia curvipetala (needle-leaf purple-gorse)
- Muraltia demissa (curly-haired purple-gorse)
- Muraltia diabolica (devils purple-gorse)
- Muraltia mixta (roughpod purple-gorse)
- Muraltia orbicularis (round-leaf purple-gorse)
- Muraltia pageae (Page's purple-gorse)
- Muraltia satureioides var. salteri (Karbonkelberg purple-gorse)
- Muraltia stipulacea (bunch-leaf purple-gorse)
- Nemesia micrantha (Peninsula snapdragon)
- Osmitopsis dentata (toothed swampdaisy)
- Pachyodontus languidus (Peninsula ground beetle)
- Parachilota parvus
- Parachilota schultzei
- Parachilota starke
- Parachilota tokaiensis
- Parajapyx afer
- Paralamyctes asperulus
- Paramelita auricularius
- Paramelita barnardi (Peninsula cave amphipod)
- Paramelita capensis
- Paramelita dentata
- Paramelita magna
- Paramelita magnicornis
- Paramelita marunguis
- Paramelita pheronyx
- Paranotoniscus capensis
- Pentameris longiglumis subsp. longiglumis (Table Mountain longglume)
- Peripatopsis alba (cave velvetworm)
- Peripatopsis leonine (lion velvetworm)
- Perisphaeria carlgreni (Peninsula trilobyte cockroach)
- Petroplax caricis (Peninsula golden-case caddisfly)
- Petrothrincus circularis
- Philocaffrus bifalcatus
- Phylica schlechteri (Peninsula phylica)
- Platentomus sobrinus
- Platylimnobia montana
- Pneuminion balfourbrownei
- Pneuminion semisulcatum
- Poeciloblatta angusta
- Polycarena silenoides (granite Cape flax)
- Prismatocarpus nitidus (silver longfuit)
- Progonogamia rehni
- Prostethops megacephalus
- Prostethops nitens
- Protojanira leleupi
- Pseudocloeon magae (Peninsula minnow mayfly)
- Pseudoselago peninsulae (Peninsula purplepuff)
- Psoralea glaucina (Peninsula three-leaf pea)
- Pterostethops equestris
- Pterygodium connivens (Peninsula bonnet)
- Quamtana leptopholcica
- Restio communis (fine cord reed)
- Restio dodii var. dodii (Dodd's marsh cord reed)
- Rhampsinitus levis
- Roella amplexicaulis (rigid bell)
- Roella decurrens (longbase bell)
- Roella goodiana (klaver bell)
- Roella recurvata (recurved bell)
- Roella squarrosa (mat bell)
- Roella triflora (blackeye bell)
- Roeweria inerriiis
- Rostromontia capensis
- Rostromontia granulifer
- Rotandrela rotanda
- Ruschia promontorii (rock turretfig)
- Ruschia rubricaulis (red-stem turretfig)
- Scabiosa africana (Cape scabious)
- Senecio verbascifolius (Peninsula ragwort)
- Serruria collina (lost spiderhead)
- Serruria cyanoides (Wynberg spiderhead)
- Serruria decumbens (Peninsula spiderhead)
- Serruria foeniculacea (Rondevlei spiderhead)
- Serruria glomerata (cluster spiderhead)
- Serruria hirsuta (Swartkops spiderhead)
- Serruria villosa (valley spiderhead)
- Sheldonia capsula
- Solpuga grindleyi (Peninsula sunspider)
- Spelaeogryphus lepidops (cave shrimp)
- Speleiacris tabulae (cave camel cricket)
- Speleomontia cavernicola (cave trinon harvestman)
- Speleosiro argasiformis (cave sironid harvestman)
- Spermophora gordimerae (Peninsula daddylonglegs)
- Spermophora peninsulae (cave daddylonglegs)
- Sphaerotherium ancillare
- Sphaerotherium eremita
- Sphaerotherium monticola
- Sphaerotherium weberi
- Staavia dodii (dolls diamondeyes)
- Staavia glutinosa (sticky diamondeyes)
- Stoebe rosea (rose slangbos)
- Tetraria autumnalis (Sirkelsvlei mountain sedge)
- Tetraria graminifolia (Peninsula mountain sedge)
- Tetraria paludosa (pale mountain sedge)
- Tetraria variabilis (varied mountain sedge)
- Thamnochortus levynsiae (cliff dangle reed)
- Thamnochortus nutans (cloud dangle reed)
- Thesium pseudovirgatum (false-branched rootthug)
- Thestor yildizae (Peninsula thestor)
- Trachycystis cosmia (cosmic pinwheel)
- Trachycystis perplicata (Cape pinwheel)
- Trianoptiles solitaria (solitary bristle sedge)
- Trichoniscus austro-africanus
- Trichoniscus capensis
- Trichoniscus tabulae (cave sowbug)
- Trichostetha mimetica (Peninsula chafer)
- Uroplectes insignis (Newlands scorpion)
- Ursinia tenuifolia subsp tenuifolia
- Villarsia goldblattiana (Peninsula bogbean)
- Wahlenbergia brehmeri
- Wahlenbergia pyrophila (fire capebell)
- Walesobius excrescens
- Watsonia tabularis (Table Mountain watsonia)
- Willdenowia affinis (Table Mountain window reed)
- Wurmbea hiemalis (black spikelily)

Additional species

- Leucadendron levisanus (Cape Flats conebush)
- Aspalathus variegata (Cape Flats gorse) (extinct)
- Lepidochrysops methymna dicksoni (Dicksons dark opal) (Tygerberg)
- Cliffortia ericifolia (erica-leaf climbers-friend)
- Ixia versicolor (flats kollosie)
- Liparia graminifolia (grass mountain pea) (extinct)
- Serruria furcellata (Kraaifontein spiderhead)
- Lampranthus stenus (narrow brightfig)
- Erica margaritacea (pearl heath)
- Erica pyramidalis (pyramid heath) (extinct)
- Serruria foeniculacea (Rondevlei spiderhead)
- Erica turgida (showy heath) (extinct)
- Trianoptiles solitaria (solitary bristle sedge)
- Serruria aemula (strawberry spiderhead)
- Athanasia capitata (unihead kanniedood)
- Tetraria variabilis (varied mountain sedge)
- Erica verticillata (whorled heath) (extinct)

== Species records in South African Biodiversity Database ==
=== Mammals ===
Mammals present in Cape Town, as of 2011, include the following.

- Acomys subspinosus (Cape spiny mouse)
- Amblysomus hottentotus (Hottentot golden mole)
- Aonyx capensis (Cape clawless otter)
- Arctocephalus pusillus (Cape fur seal)
- Atilax paludinosus (water mongoose)
- Eubalaena glacialis (southern right whale)
- Bathyergus suillus (Cape dune molerat)
- Canis lupus familiaris (domestic dog)
- Cephalorhynchus heavisidii (Heaviside's dolphin)
- Chlorotalpa duthieae (Duthie's golden mole)
- Connochaetes gnou (black wildebeest)
- Crocidura cyanea (reddish-grey musk shrew)
- Cryptomys hottentotus (common molerat)
- Cynictis penicillata (yellow mongoose)
- Damaliscus pygargus pygargus (bontebok)
- Delphinus delphis (common dolphin)
- Dendromus melanotis (grey climbing mouse)
- Dendromus mesomelas (Brant's climbing mouse)
- Elephantulus edwardii (Cape rock elephant-shrew)
- Eptesicus capensis (Cape serotine bat)
- Eremitalpa granti (Grant's golden mole)
- Felis caracal (caracal)
- Felis silvestris catus (domestic cat)
- Galerella pulverulenta (small grey mongoose)
- Genetta genetta (smallspotted genet)
- Genetta tigrina (large-spotted genet)
- Georychus capensis (Cape molerat)
- Gerbillurus paeba (hairyfooted gerbil)
- Herpestes ichneumon (large grey mongoose)
- Hippopotamus amphibius (hippopotamus)
- Hystrix africaeaustralis (porcupine)
- Ictonyx striatus (striped polecat)
- Kogia simus (dwarf sperm whale)
- Lagenodelphis hosei (Fraser's dolphin)
- Lagenorhynchus obscurus (dusky dolphin)
- Lepus capensis (Cape hare)
- Lepus saxatilis (scrub hare)
- Myomyscus verreauxii, syn. Mastomys verreauxii (Verreaux's mouse)
- Mellivora capensis (honey badger)
- Mirounga leonina (southern elephant seal)
- Mus minutoides (African pygmy mouse)
- Mus musculus (house mouse)
- Myosorex varius (forest shrew)
- Mystromys albicaudatus (whitetailed mouse)
- Orcinus orca (killer whale)
- Oreotragus oreotragus (klipspringer)
- Orycteropus afer (aardvark)
- Otocyon megalotis (bat-eared fox)
- Otomys irroratus (vlei rat)
- Otomys unisulcatus (bush Karoo rat)
- Panthera pardus (leopard)
- Papio ursinus (chacma baboon)
- Pelea capreolus (grey rhebok)
- Poecilogale albinucha (striped weasel)
- Procavia capensis (rock dassie)
- Pronolagus rupestris (Smith's red rock rabbit)
- Pseudorca crassidens (false killer whale)
- Raphicerus campestris (steenbok)
- Raphicerus melanotis (Cape grysbok)
- Rattus norvegicus (brown rat)
- Rattus rattus (house rat)
- Rhabdomys pumilio (striped mouse, striped field mouse)
- Rousettus aegyptiacus (Egyptian fruit bat)
- Sciurus carolinensis (eastern grey squirrel|grey squirrel)
- Suncus varilla (lesser dwarf shrew)
- Sylvicapra grimmia (common duiker)
- Tatera afra (Cape gerbil)
- Vulpes chama (Cape fox)
- Ziphius cavirostris (Cuvier's beaked whale)

=== Fish ===
Fish present in Cape Town, as of 2011, include the following.

- Amblyrhynchotes honkenii (evil-eyed blaasop)
- Anguilla mossambica steinitzi (longfin eel)
- Atherina breviceps (Cape silverside)
- Caffrogobius multifasciatus (prison goby)
- Caffrogobius nudiceps (barehead goby)
- Clarias gariepinus (sharp-tooth catfish)
- Cyprinus carpio (carp)
- Galaxias zebratus (Cape galaxias)
- Gambusia affinis (mosquito fish)
- Gilchristella aestuarius (estuarine round-herring)
- Heteromycteris capensis (Cape sole)
- Lichia amia (garrick)
- Lithognathus lithognathus (white steenbras)
- Liza dumerilii (groovy mullet)
- Liza richardsonii (southern mullet)
- Micropterus salmoides (largemouth bass)
- Mugil cephalus (flathead mullet)
- Oreochromis mossambicus (Mozambique tilapia)
- Pomatomus saltatrix (elf)
- Psammogobius knysnaensis (Knysna goby)
- Rhabdosargus globiceps (white stumpnose)
- Rhabdosargus holubi (Cape stumpnose)
- Solea bleekeri (blackhand sole)
- Leptonotus norae (longsnout pipefish)
- Tilapia sparrmanii (banded tilapia)

=== Reptiles ===
Reptiles present in Cape Town, as of 2011, include the following.

- Acontias meleagris (Cape legless skink)
- Acontias meleagris meleagris (Cape legless skink)
- Acontias meleagris orientalis (Cape legless skink)
- Afrogecko porphyreus (marbled leaf-toed gecko, marbled leaftoed gecko)
- Agama atra (southern rock agama)
- Aspidelaps lubricus lubricus (coral snake)
- Bitis arietans (puff adder, puffadder)
- Bitis atropos (berg adder)
- Bradypodion pumilum (Cape dwarf chameleon)
- Chamaesaura anguina (Cape grass lizard)
- Chersina angulata (angulate tortoise)
- Cordylus cordylus (Cape girdled lizard)
- Cordylus niger (black girdled lizard)
- Cordylus polyzonus (Karoo girdled lizard)
- Dasypeltis scabra (common eggeater)
- Dispholidus typus (boomslang)
- Duberria lutrix (common slug eater)
- Duberria lutrix lutrix (common slugeater)
- Geochelone pardalis (leopard tortoise)
- Goggia lineata (striped dwarf leaf-toed gecko, striped dwarf leaftoed gecko)
- Hemachatus haemachatus (rinkhals)
- Homopus areolatus (parrot-beaked tortoise, parrotbeaked tortoise)
- Homoroselaps lacteus (spotted harlequin snake)
- Lamprophis aurora (Aurora house snake)
- Lamprophis capensis (brown house snake)
- Lamprophis guttatus (spotted house snake)
- Lamprophis inornatus (olive house snake)
- Leptotyphlops longicaudus (long-tailed thread snake, longtailed thread snake)
- Lycodonomorphus rufulus (common brown water snake)
- Meroles knoxii (Knox's desert lizard)
- Naja nivea (Cape cobra)
- Pachydactylus austeni (Austen's thick-toed gecko, Austen's thicktoed gecko)
- Pachydactylus geitje (ocellated thick-toed gecko, ocellated thicktoed gecko)
- Pachydactylus labialis (Western Cape thick-toed gecko, Western Cape thicktoed gecko)
- Pedioplanis lineoocellata (spotted sand lizard)
- Pelomedusa subrufa (marsh terrapin)
- Psammophis crucifer (cross-marked grass snake, crossmarked grass snake)
- Psammophis leightoni (Cape sand snake)
- Psammophis notostictus (Karoo sand snake)
- Psammophylax rhombeatus (rhombic skaapsteker)
- Pseudaspis cana (mole snake)
- Pseudocordylus microlepidotus (Cape crag lizard)
- Ramphotyphlops braminus (flower-pot snake, flowerpot snake)
- Rhinotyphlops lalandei (Delalande's beaked blind snake, Delalande's blind snake)
- Scelotes bipes (silvery dwarf burrowing skink)
- Scelotes montispectus (Blaauwberg dwarf burrowing skink)
- Tetradactylus seps (short-legged seps, shortlegged seps)
- Tetradactylus tetradactylus (common long-tailed seps, common longtailed seps)
- Trachylepis capensis (Cape skink)
- Trachylepis homalocephala (red-sided skink, redsided skink)
- Typhlosaurus aurantiacus (golden blind legless skink)
- Typhlosaurus caecus (Cuvier's blind legless skink)

=== Amphibians ===
Amphibians present in Cape Town, as of 2011, include the following.

- Amietia fuscigula (Cape river frog)
- Amietophrynus pantherinus (western leopard toad)
- Amietophrynus rangeri (raucous toad)
- Arthroleptella landdrosia (Landdros moss frog)
- Arthroleptella villiersi (Villiersdorp moss frog)
- Breviceps gibbosus (Cape rain frog)
- Breviceps montanus (Cape mountain rin frog)
- Breviceps namaquensis (Namaqua rain frog)
- Breviceps rosei (sand rain frog)
- Cacosternum boettgeri (common caco)
- Cacosternum platys (flat caco)
- Heleophryne rosei (Table Mountain ghost frog)
- Hyperolius horstockii (arum lily frog, arum lily reed frog)
- Hyperolius marmoratus (painted reed frog)
- Microbatrachella capense (micro frog)
- Strongylopus bonaspei (banded stream frog)
- Strongylopus grayii (clicking stream frog)
- Strongylopus grayii grayii (clicking stream frog)
- Tomopterna delalandii (Cape sand frog)
- Vandijkophrynus angusticeps (sand toad)
- Xenopus laevis (common platanna)

=== Insects ===
Insects present in Cape Town, as of 2011, include the following:

- Acraea horta (garden acraea)
- Anax imperator (blue emperor)
- Apis mellifera capensis (Cape honeybee)
- Cacyreus marshalli (common geranium bronze)
- Chrysoritis pyroeis pyroeis (sand-dune opal)
- Colias electo electo (African clouded yellow)
- Crocothemis erythraea (broad scarlet)
- Danaus chrysippus aegyptius (African monarch)
- Dira clytus clytus (Cape autumn widow)
- Eichochrysops messapus messapus (cupreous blue)
- Gegenis niso niso (common Hottentot)
- Ischnura senegalensis (common bluetail)
- Lampides boeticus (lucerne blue)
- Leptotes brevidentatus (short-toothed blue)
- Leptotes pirithous (common pea blue)
- Macroglossum trochilus (African humming bird moth)
- Metisella metis metis (golden-spotted sylph)
- Orthetrum caffrum (two-striped skimmer)
- Orthetrum julia (Julia skimmer)
- Papilio demodocus demodocus (citrus swallowtail)
- Pieris brassicae (cabbage white)
- Pontia helice helice (meadow white)
- Pseudonympha magus (silver-bottom brown, silver bottomed brown)
- Tarucus thespis (vivid blue)
- Tramea limbata (ferruginous glider)
- Vanessa cardui (painted lady)
- Zophopetes dysmephila (palm-tree nightfighter)
- Zyzeeria knysna (sooty blue)

=== Fungi ===
Fungi present in Cape Town, as of 2011, include the following.

- Agaricus bisporus (cultivated mushroom)
- Agaricus campestris (field mushroom)
- Agaricus xanthodermus (yellow-staining mushroom)
- Amanita muscaria (fly agaric)
- Coprinus comatus (shaggy ink cap)
- Coprinus micaceus (glistening ink cap)
- Favolaschia thwaitesii
- Gymnopilus junonius (orange tuft)
- Gymnopilus penetrans (small pine cap)
- Laccaria laccata (the deceiver)
- Lactarius deliciosus (pine ring)
- Lactarius vietus (grey milk cap)
- Laschia thwaitesii
- Lepiota felina (cat parasol)
- Macrolepiota zeyheri (white parasol)
- Mycena leptocephala (thin-capped mycena)
- Pycnoporus sanguineus (orange polypore)
- Russula capensis (Cape russula)
- Russula sardonia (purple stemmed russula)
- Stereum hirsutum (the hairy stereum)
- Suillus bellinii (pine bolete)
- Tricholoma albobrunneum (brown knightly mushroom)
- Vascellum praetense (common puffball)
- Volvariella speciosa (rose-gilled grisette)

== See also ==
- List of nature reserves in Cape Town
- Table Mountain National Park – Nature conservation area on the Cape Peninsula in Cape Town, South Africa
- Table Mountain National Park Marine Protected Area – Marine conservation area around the Cape Peninsula in South Africa
