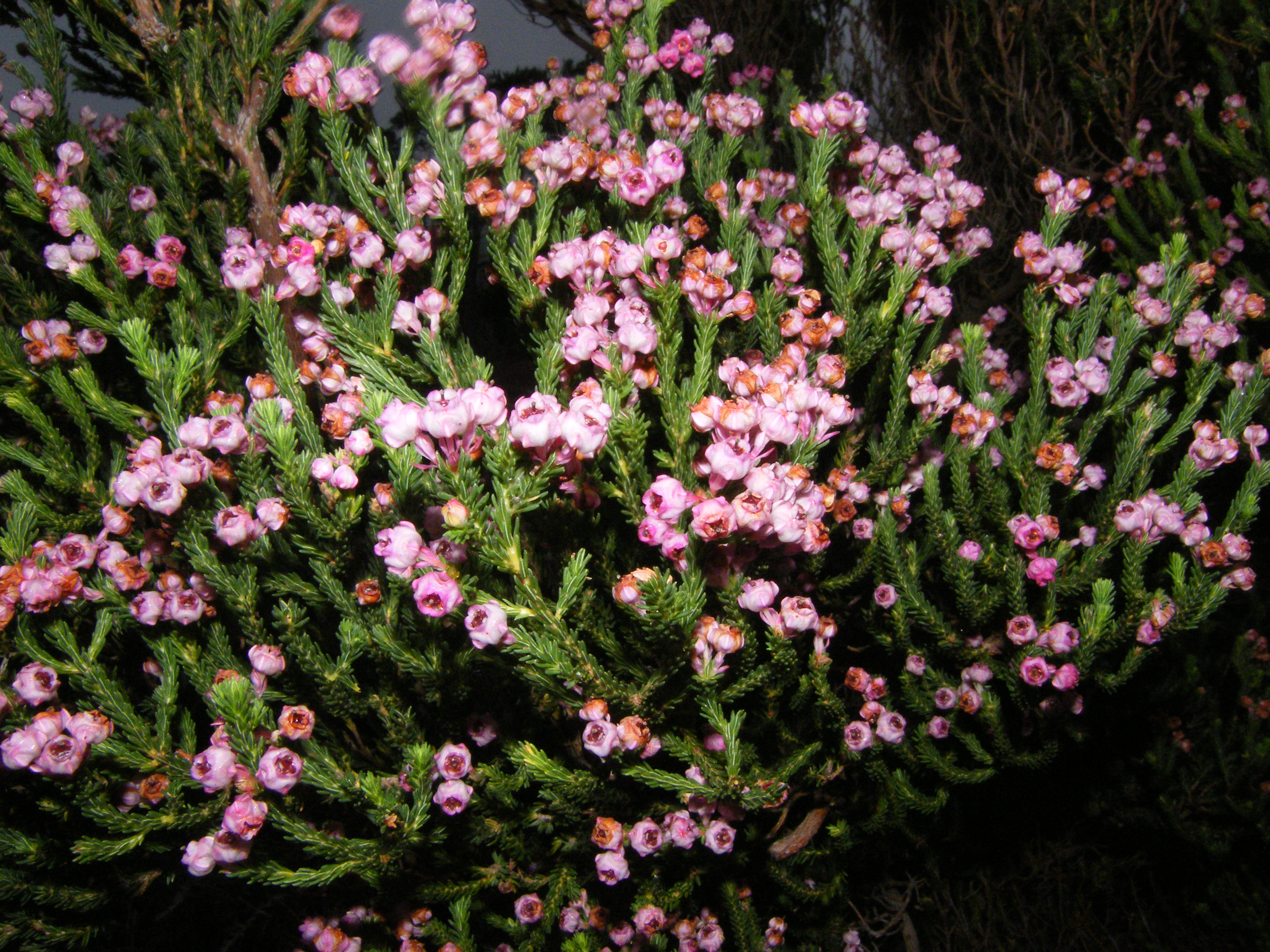

Scientific classification
- Kingdom: Plantae
- Clade: Tracheophytes
- Clade: Angiosperms
- Clade: Eudicots
- Clade: Asterids
- Order: Ericales
- Family: Ericaceae
- Genus: Erica
- Species: E. baccans

Binomial name
- Erica baccans L.

= Erica baccans =

Species of flowering plant

Erica baccans, the berry heath, is a species of Erica that was naturally restricted to the city of Cape Town, South Africa.

The plant grows up to 2 metres (6 1/2 feet) in height and produces masses of tiny, pink, berry-shaped flowers. These are produced in groups of four at the ends of the branches, remaining from September to November.

The species name "baccans" comes from Latin and means berry-like, which refers to the shape of the flowers.

E. baccans grows on medium or lower slopes from Signal Hill to Simonstown. It can be found in Peninsula Sandstone Fynbos, is endemic to Table Mountain, and grows in groups on warm mountain slopes or in moist places at lower altitudes.

The species is naturalised in parts of Australia where it colonises disturbed sites. It is becoming increasingly popular as an ornamental plant in Cape Town gardens.

== See also ==
- Biodiversity of Cape Town
