= Erica eburnea =

- In Table Mountain National Park

Scientific classification
- Kingdom: Plantae
- Clade: Tracheophytes
- Clade: Angiosperms
- Clade: Eudicots
- Clade: Asterids
- Order: Ericales
- Family: Ericaceae
- Genus: Erica
- Species: E. eburnea

Binomial name
- Erica eburnea T.M.Salter

Species of flowering plant

Erica eburnea, the ivory heath, is a plant belonging to the genus Erica and forming part of the fynbos. The species is endemic to the Western Cape and occurs in the Cape Peninsula in the Table Mountain National Park. The plant has an area of occurrence of 24 km² and is considered rare. There are invasive plants where the plant occurs but clearing processes ensure that the species is not currently threatened.
