= Disa nubigena =

Scientific classification
- Kingdom: Plantae
- Clade: Tracheophytes
- Clade: Angiosperms
- Clade: Monocots
- Order: Asparagales
- Family: Orchidaceae
- Subfamily: Orchidoideae
- Genus: Disa
- Species: D. nubigena

Binomial name
- Disa nubigena H.P.Linder

Synonyms
- Monadenia nubigena (H.P.Linder) Szlach.

Species of flowering plant

Disa nubigena, commonly known as the cloud disa, is a perennial plant and geophyte belonging to the genus Disa and is part of the fynbos. The plant is endemic to the Western Cape and occurs from the Cape Peninsula to the Hex River Mountains, near Worcester, at altitudes of 1 000 to 1 800 m. There are only two subpopulations, one of which is on Table Mountain. The subpopulation did not flower after two fires that occurred here, the reason is unknown. The plant was first discovered in 1997 after a veldfire and four plants were found. However, after the fires of the 2000s and 2009, no plants were found.

In 2008, one plant was found in the Hex River Mountains at a high altitude in an inaccessible part of the mountain. There are probably more plants in other inaccessible parts of the mountains. The plant is considered rare.
