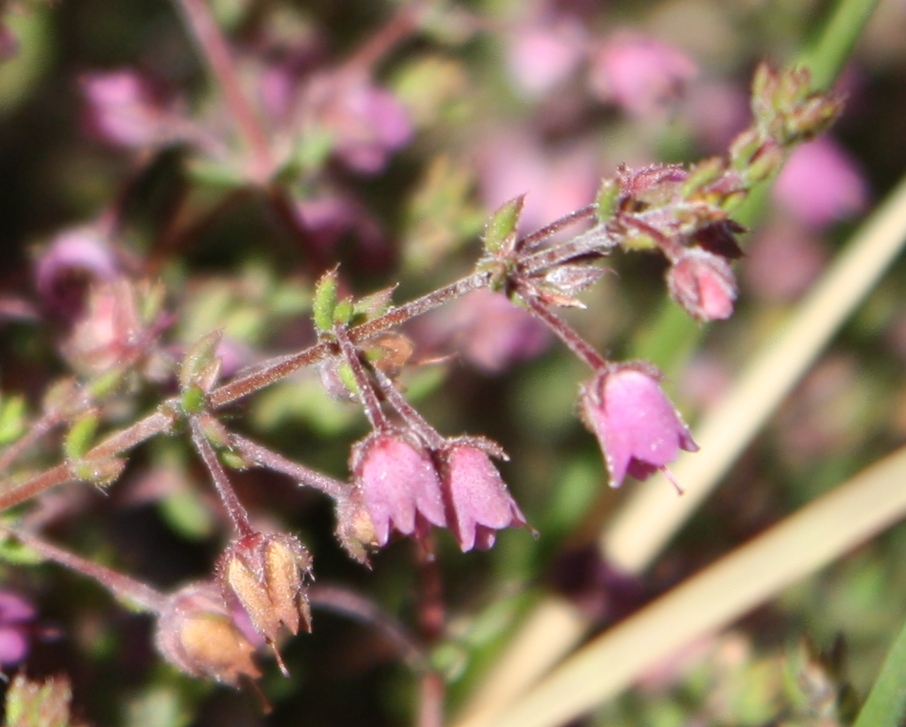

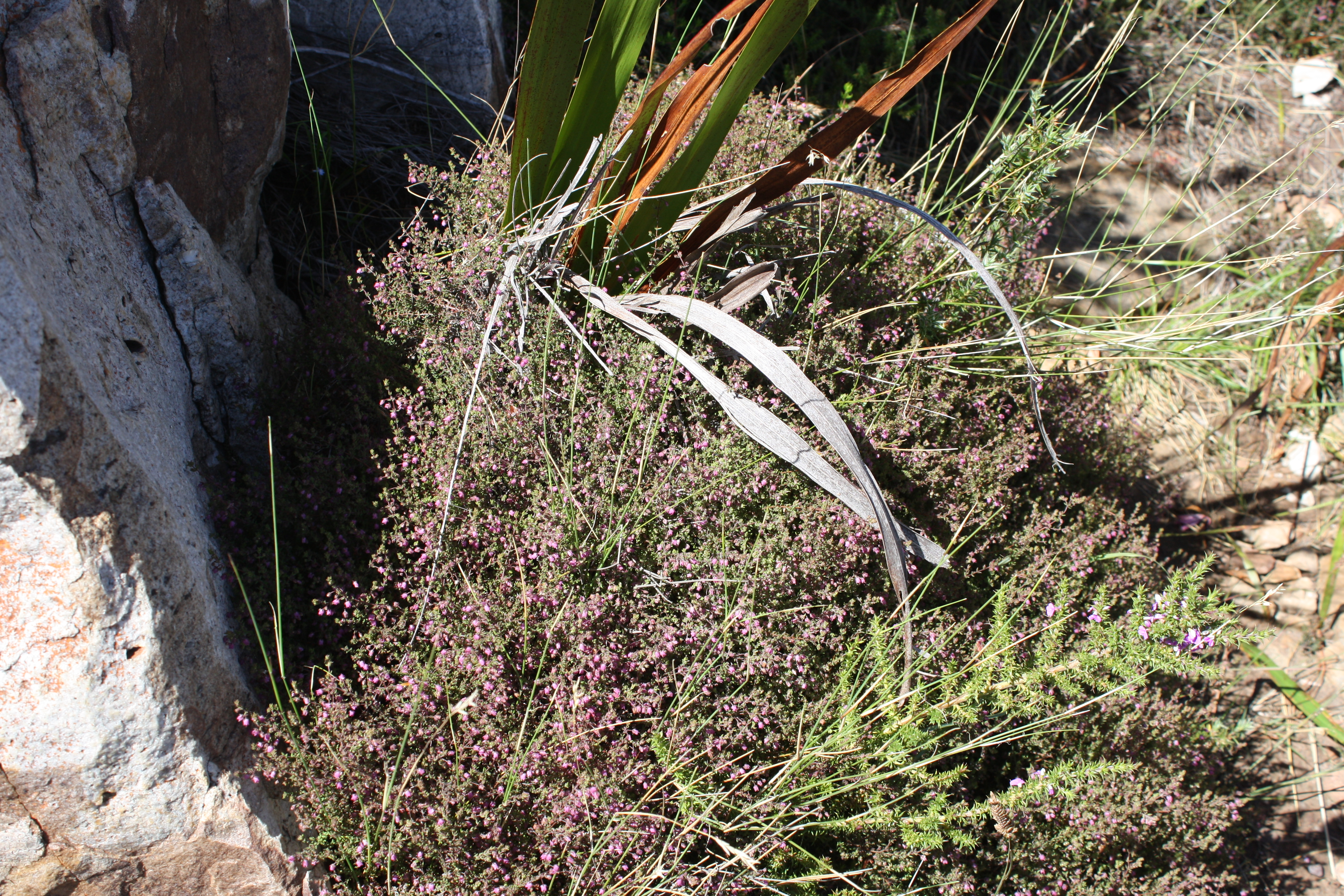

Scientific classification
- Kingdom: Plantae
- Clade: Tracheophytes
- Clade: Angiosperms
- Clade: Eudicots
- Clade: Asterids
- Order: Ericales
- Family: Ericaceae
- Genus: Erica
- Species: E. planifolia

Binomial name
- Erica planifolia L., (1762)

Synonyms
- Callista thymifolia Steud.; Ceramia planifolia G.Don; Ceramia thymifolia G.Don; Erica distans A.Spreng.; Erica planifolia J.C.Wendl.; Erica thymifolia Andrews; Ericoides planifolium (L.) Kuntze; Ericoides thymifolium (Andrews) Kuntze

= Erica planifolia =

Gland Heath

Species of flowering plant

Erica planifolia, known in English as the gland heath, is a plant belonging to the genus Erica and is part of the fynbos. The species is endemic to the Western Cape.
