= Leucadendron macowanii =

Conservation status
- Critically Endangered (IUCN 3.1)

Scientific classification
- Kingdom: Plantae
- Clade: Embryophytes
- Clade: Tracheophytes
- Clade: Spermatophytes
- Clade: Angiosperms
- Clade: Eudicots
- Order: Proteales
- Family: Proteaceae
- Genus: Leucadendron
- Species: L. macowanii

Binomial name
- Leucadendron macowanii E.Phillips

Species of flowering plant

Leucadendron macowanii, the acacia-leaf conebush, is a flower-bearing shrub that belongs to the genus Leucadendron and forms part of the fynbos. The plant is native to the Western Cape, South Africa.

The flowers of Leucadendron macowanii are composed of bracts that create a cone-like appearance. The bracts come in a range of colors, including shades of green, pink, and red, making it an attractive ornamental plant. These flowers are often used in floral arrangements and landscaping.

Leucadendron macowanii is adapted to the Mediterranean climate of the region and can tolerate dry conditions and poor soils. It is known for its ability to regenerate after wildfires, as the plant stores seeds in specialized structures known as "fruiting cones."

In its natural habitat, Leucadendron macowanii is an important component of the fynbos vegetation, a diverse and unique plant community found in the Western Cape of South Africa.

== Description ==
The shrub grows 2.3 m (7.5 ft) tall and bears flowers in May to July. Fire destroys the plant but the seeds survive. The seeds are stored in a toll on the female plant and are released where they fall to the ground and are possibly spread by the wind. The plant is unisexual and there are male and female plant and propagate by wind pollination.

In Afrikaans, it is known as acacia-blaartolbos.

== Distribution and habitat ==
The plant it is found in the Cape Peninsula at Smitswinkel Bay and Wynberg. The plant grows mainly in moist sandy soil near streams at altitudes of 60–200 m (200–660 ft).
