= Erica cyrilliflora =

Scientific classification
- Kingdom: Plantae
- Clade: Tracheophytes
- Clade: Angiosperms
- Clade: Eudicots
- Clade: Asterids
- Order: Ericales
- Family: Ericaceae
- Genus: Erica
- Species: E. cyrilliflora

Binomial name
- Erica cyrilliflora Salisb.

Synonyms
- Erica palustris Andrews; Ericoides cyrilliflorum (Salisb.) Kuntze; Syringodea cyrilliflora (Salisb.) G.Don

Species of flowering plant

Erica cyrilliflora is a plant belonging to the genus Erica and forming part of the fynbos. The species is endemic to the Western Cape and occurs in the Cape Peninsula between Kommetjie and Simon's Town. The plant has an area of occurrence of 2 km² and there are two subpopulations. The plant's habitat has been partially displaced by urban development and dam construction. It is further threatened by invasive plants.
