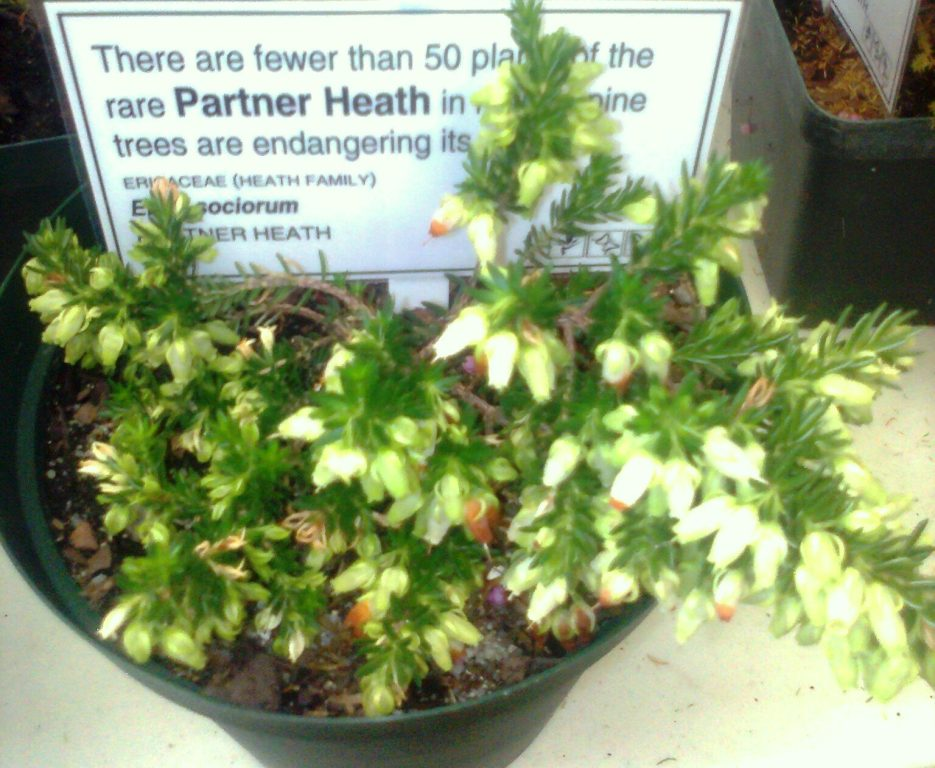

Scientific classification
- Kingdom: Plantae
- Clade: Tracheophytes
- Clade: Angiosperms
- Clade: Eudicots
- Clade: Asterids
- Order: Ericales
- Family: Ericaceae
- Genus: Erica
- Species: E. sociorum

Binomial name
- Erica sociorum L.Bolus

= Erica sociorum =

Species of flowering plant

Erica sociorum, the Noordhoek cliff heath, partner heath and companion heath, is a plant belonging to the genus Erica and is part of the fynbos. The species is endemic to the Western Cape and occurs at Noordhoek Peak on the Cape Peninsula. It has an area of occurrence of 0.1 km^{2} and there are 59 plants in one population. The plants are declining due to habitat loss due to the growth of pine trees, an invasive plant.
