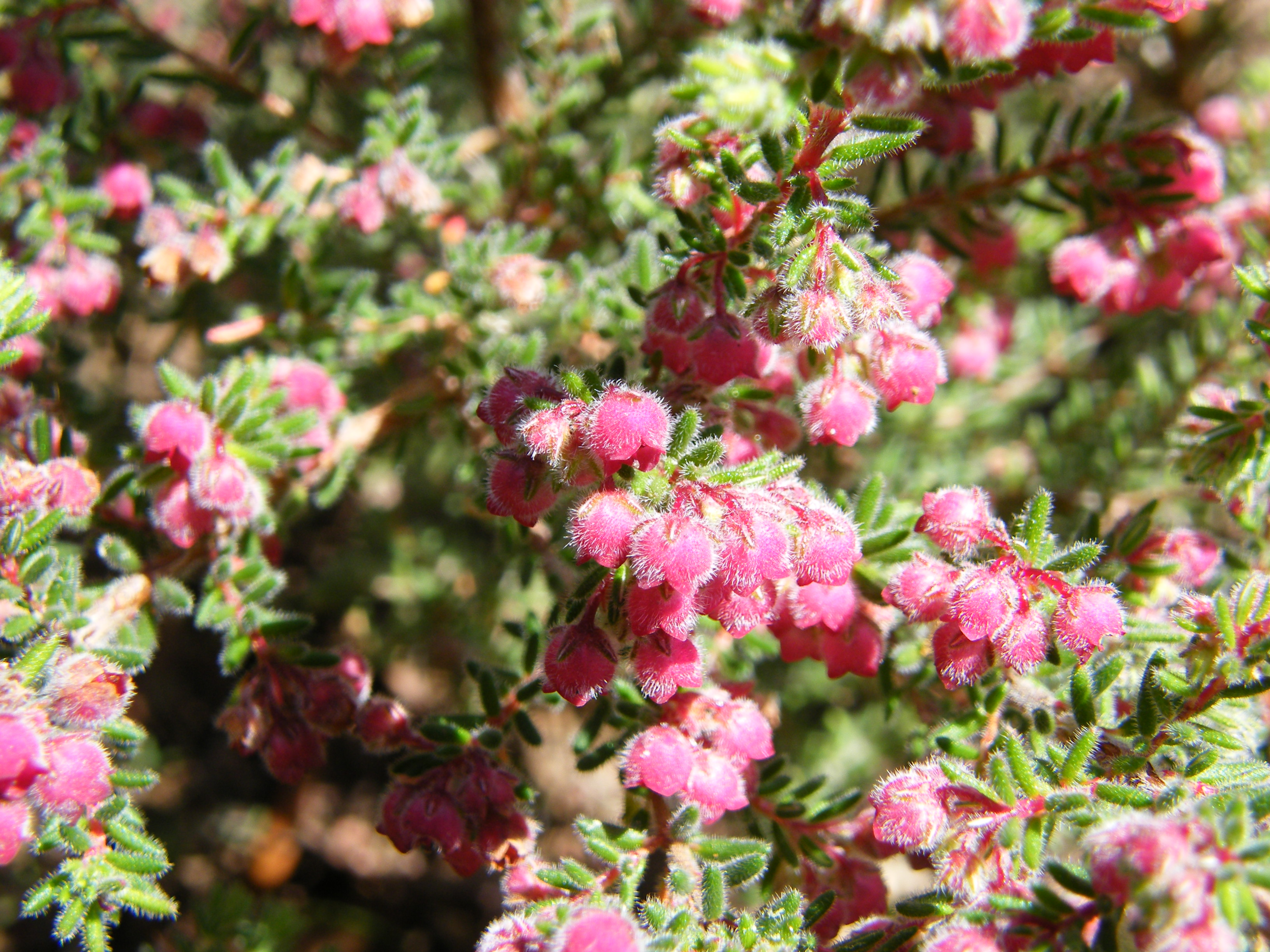

Scientific classification
- Kingdom: Plantae
- Clade: Tracheophytes
- Clade: Angiosperms
- Clade: Eudicots
- Clade: Asterids
- Order: Ericales
- Family: Ericaceae
- Genus: Erica
- Species: E. haematocodon

Binomial name
- Erica haematocodon Salisb.

= Erica haematocodon =

Species of flowering plant

Erica haematocodon, the blood-bell heath, is a species of Erica that was naturally restricted to the city of Cape Town, South Africa, where it grows in the Peninsula Sandstone Fynbos of Table Mountain.
