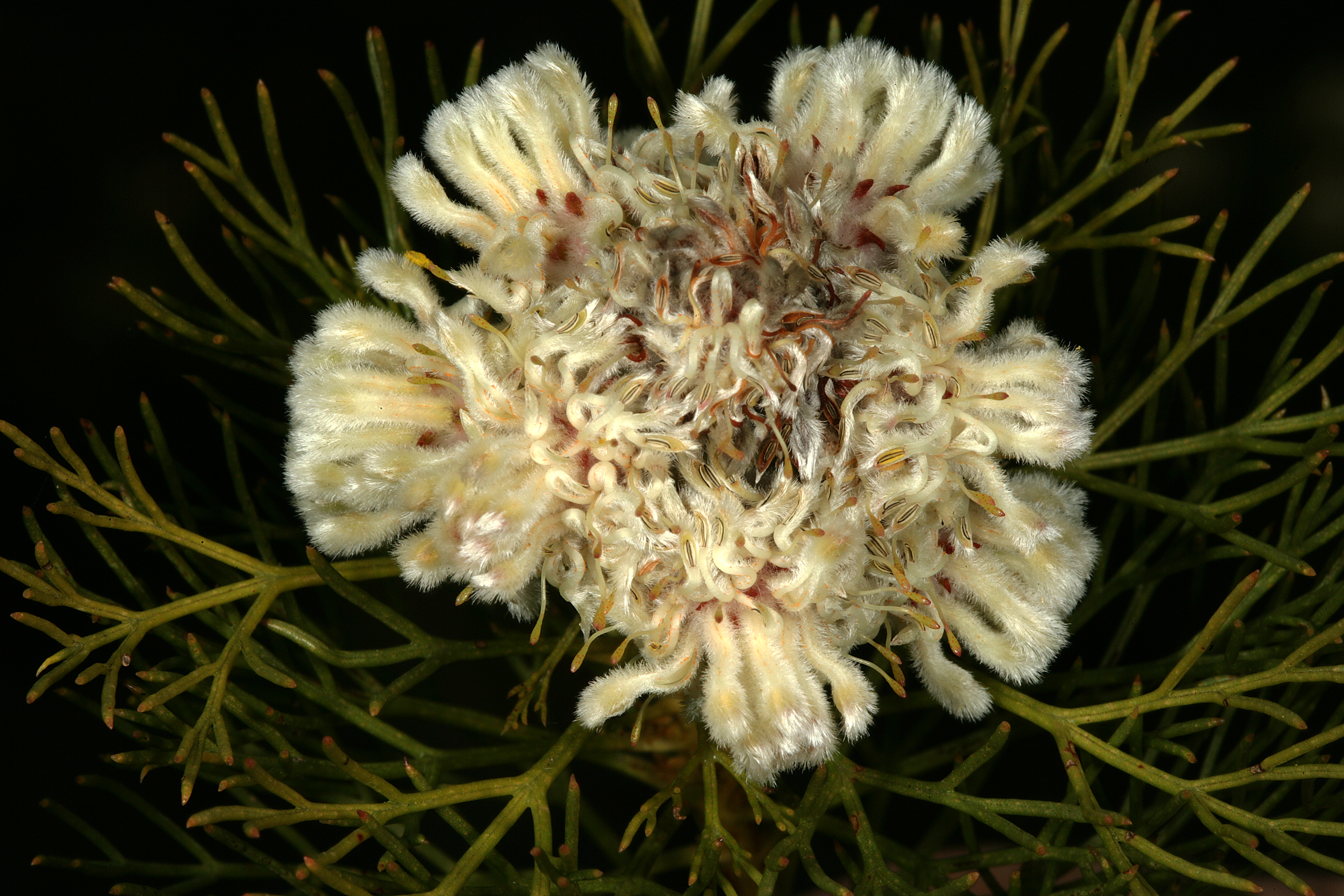

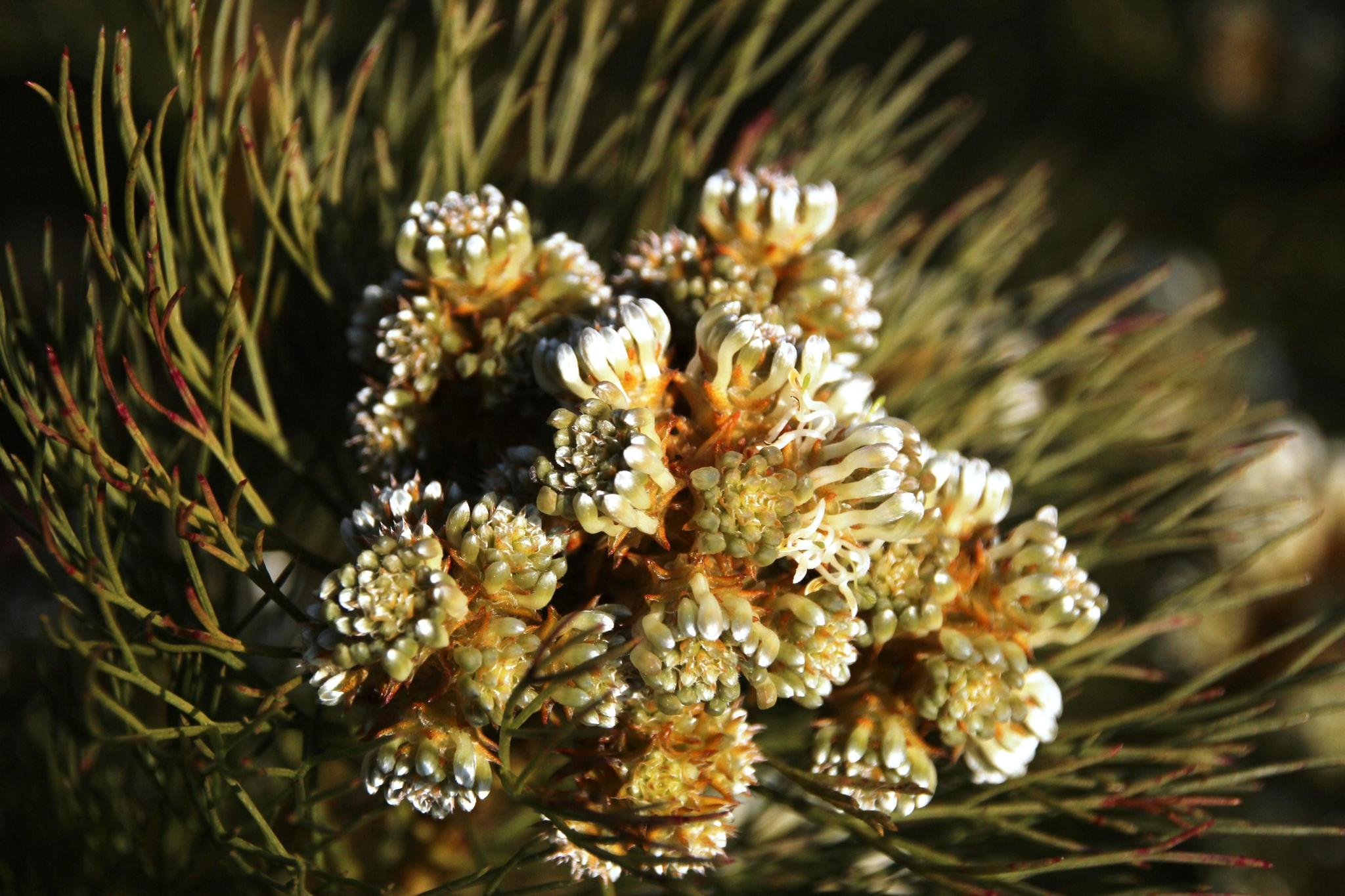

Conservation status
- Least Concern (IUCN 3.1)

Scientific classification
- Kingdom: Plantae
- Clade: Tracheophytes
- Clade: Angiosperms
- Clade: Eudicots
- Order: Proteales
- Family: Proteaceae
- Genus: Serruria
- Species: S. glomerata

Binomial name
- Serruria glomerata (L.) R.Br.

Synonyms
- Leucadendron glomeratum L.; Leucadendron sphaerocephalum P.J.Bergius; Protea glomerata (L.) L.; Protea patula Thunb.; Serruria bergii R.Br.; Serruria sphaerocephala (P.J.Bergius) Druce

= Serruria glomerata =

Species of flowering plant

Serruria glomerata, the cluster spiderhead, is a flower-bearing shrub that belongs to the genus Serruria and forms part of the fynbos. The plant is native to the Western Cape, occurring on the Cape Flats and Cape Peninsula. The shrub is erect and grows only 40 cm tall and bears flowers from August to October.

In Afrikaans, it is known as trosspinnekopbos.

== Reproduction ==
Fire destroys the plant but the seeds survive. Two months after flowering, the fruit falls off and ants disperse the seeds. They store the seeds in their nests. The plant is unisexual. Pollination takes place through the action of insects. The plant grows in sandy soil at altitudes of 0–330 m.
