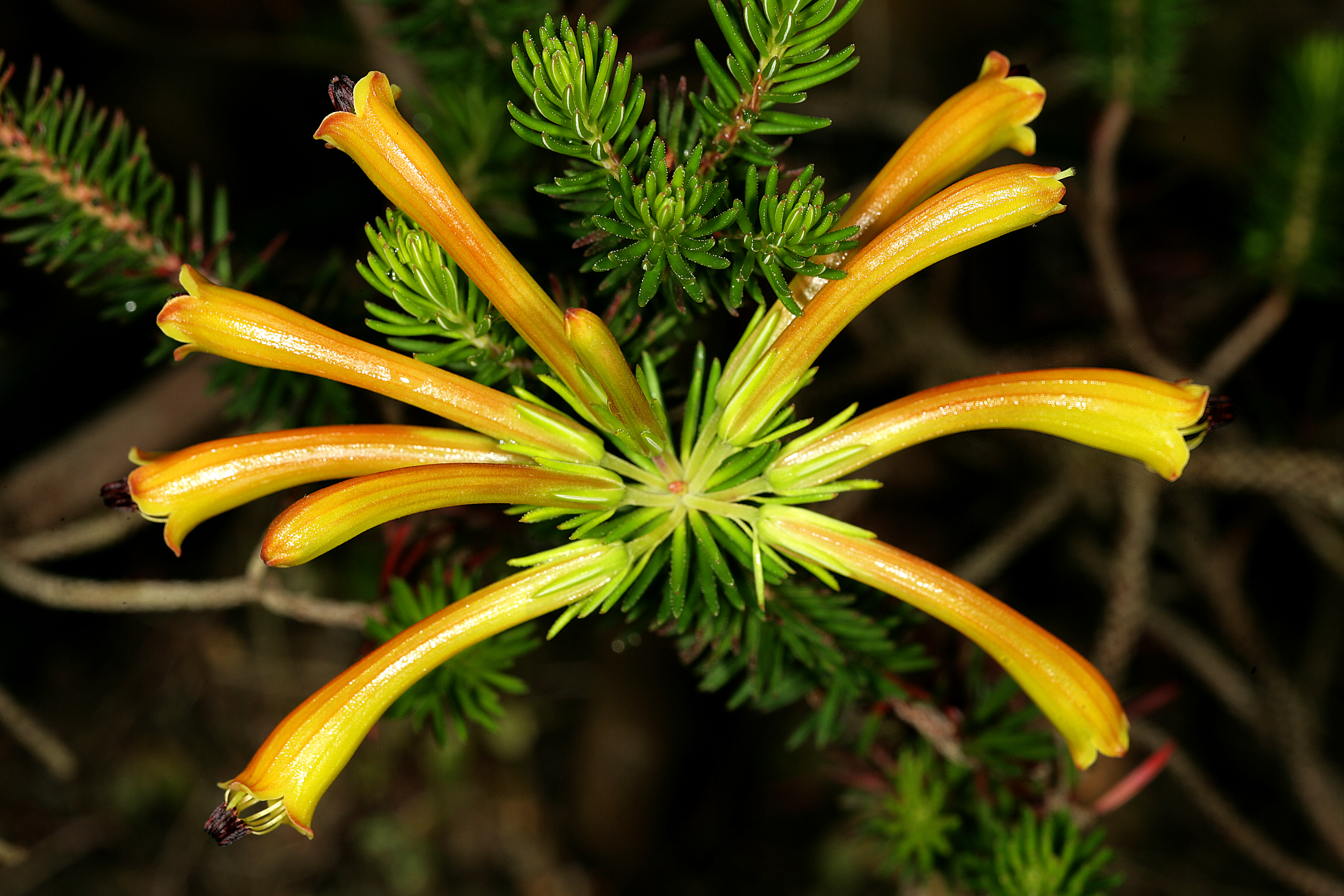

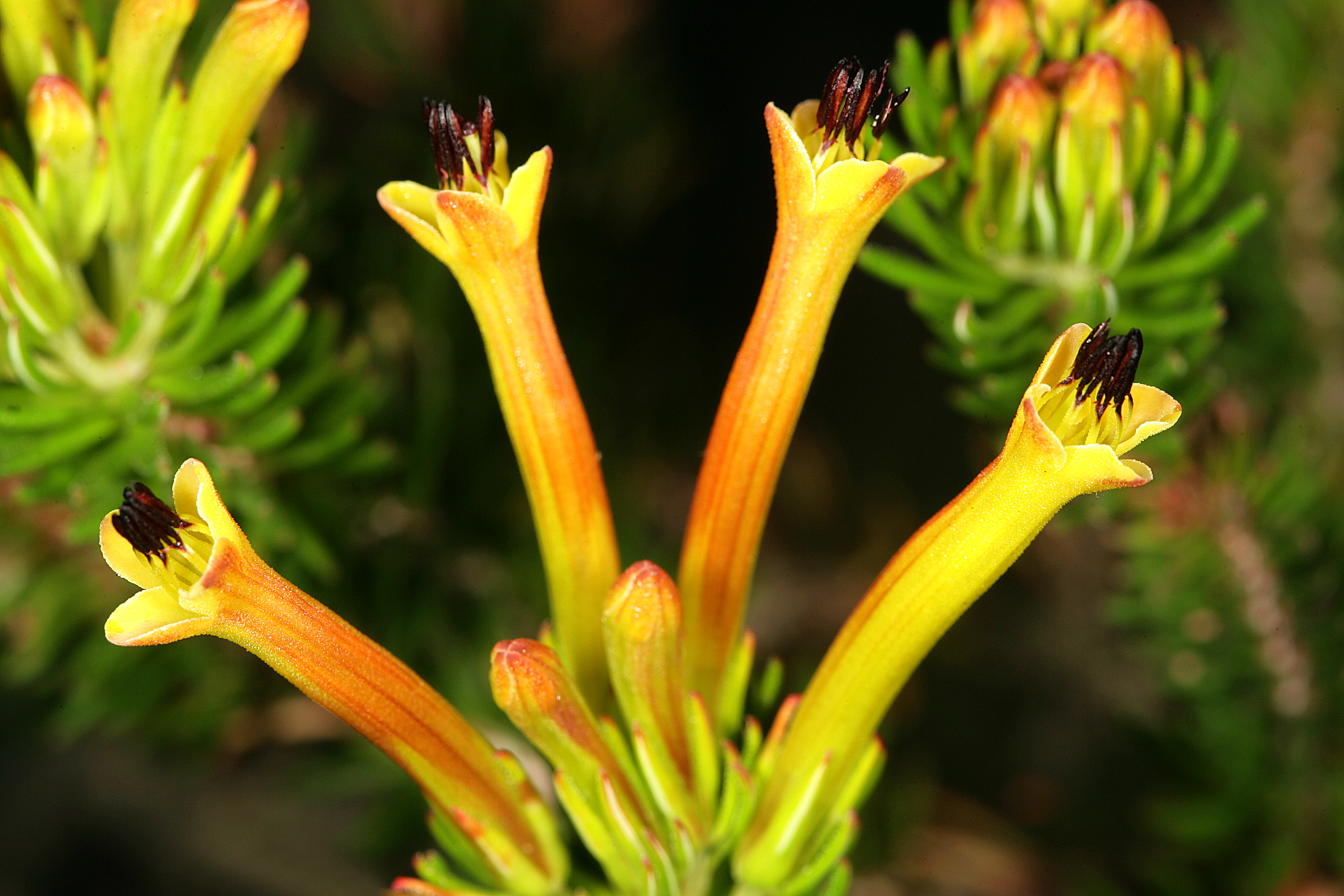

Scientific classification
- Kingdom: Plantae
- Clade: Tracheophytes
- Clade: Angiosperms
- Clade: Eudicots
- Clade: Asterids
- Order: Ericales
- Family: Ericaceae
- Genus: Erica
- Species: E. quadrisulcata

Binomial name
- Erica quadrisulcata L.Bolus

= Erica quadrisulcata =

Species of flowering plant

Erica quadrisulcata, the orange rock-heath, four-groove heath, or Swartkop heath, is a plant belonging to the genus Erica and is part of the fynbos. The species is endemic to the Western Cape. Here it occurs in the southern part of the Cape Peninsula on the mountain above Simon's Town. Here there is one population in an area of 12 km². The habitat is safe, it is still safe from invasive plants and is protected in the Table Mountain National Park. The plant is considered rare.
