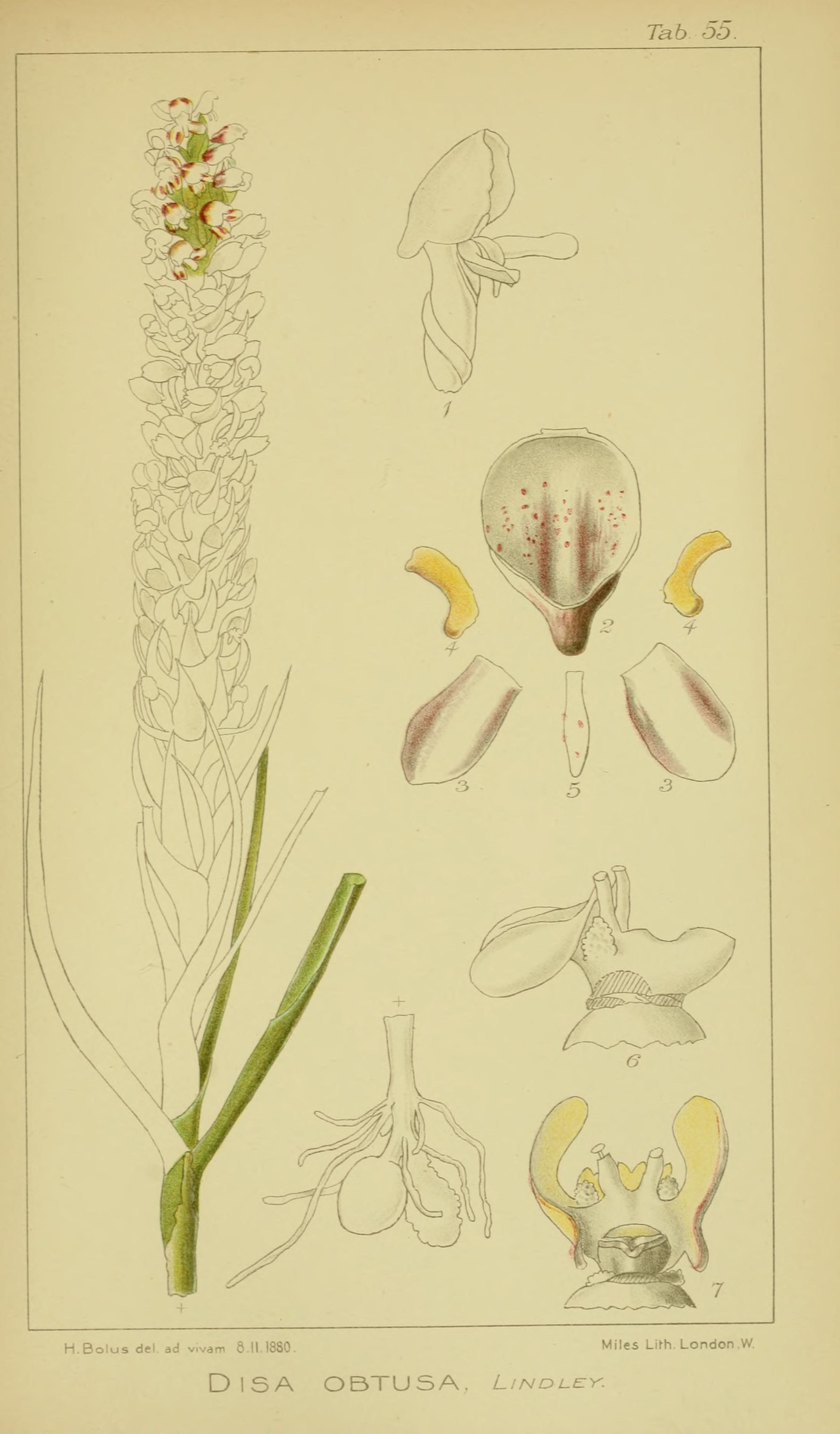

Scientific classification
- Kingdom: Plantae
- Clade: Tracheophytes
- Clade: Angiosperms
- Clade: Monocots
- Order: Asparagales
- Family: Orchidaceae
- Subfamily: Orchidoideae
- Genus: Disa
- Species: D. obtusa

Binomial name
- Disa obtusa Lindl.

Synonyms
- Disa tabularis Sond.

= Disa obtusa =

Species of flowering plant

Disa obtusa is a perennial plant and geophyte belonging to the genus Disa and is part of the fynbos. The plant is endemic to the Western Cape.

There are three subspecies:

- Disa obtusa subsp. hottentotica H.P.Linder
- Disa obtusa subsp. obtusa
- Disa obtusa subsp. picta (Sond.) H.P.Linder
