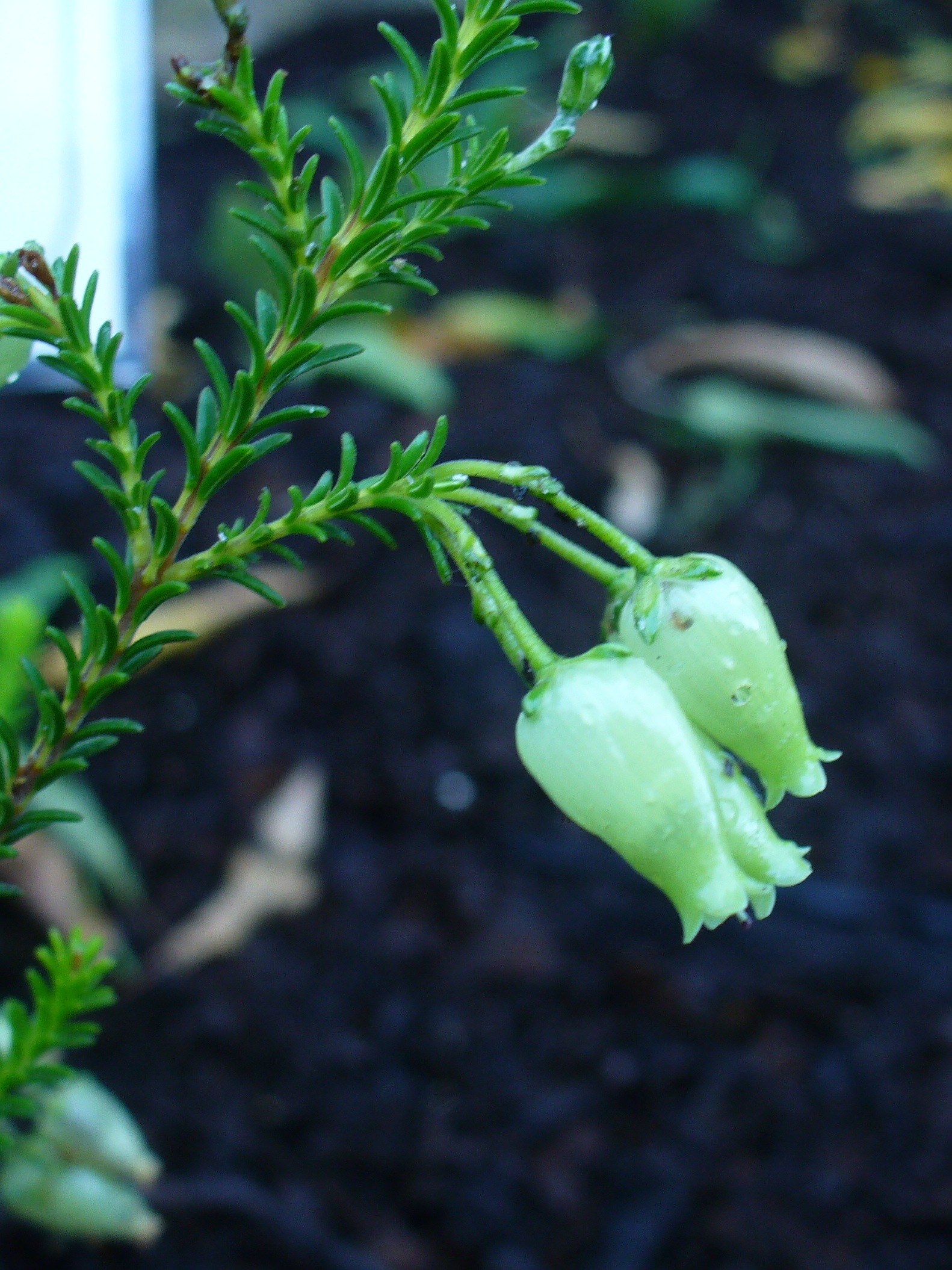

Scientific classification
- Kingdom: Plantae
- Clade: Tracheophytes
- Clade: Angiosperms
- Clade: Eudicots
- Clade: Asterids
- Order: Ericales
- Family: Ericaceae
- Genus: Erica
- Species: E. urna-viridis

Binomial name
- Erica urna-viridis Salisb.

= Erica urna-viridis =

Species of flowering plant

Erica urna-viridis, the sticky heath or bottle-green heath, is a species of Erica that was naturally restricted to the city of Cape Town, South Africa, in particular the Peninsula Sandstone Fynbos of Table Mountain.

It bears sticky green flowers - the origin of its common names - and grows to a height of about 1 meter.
