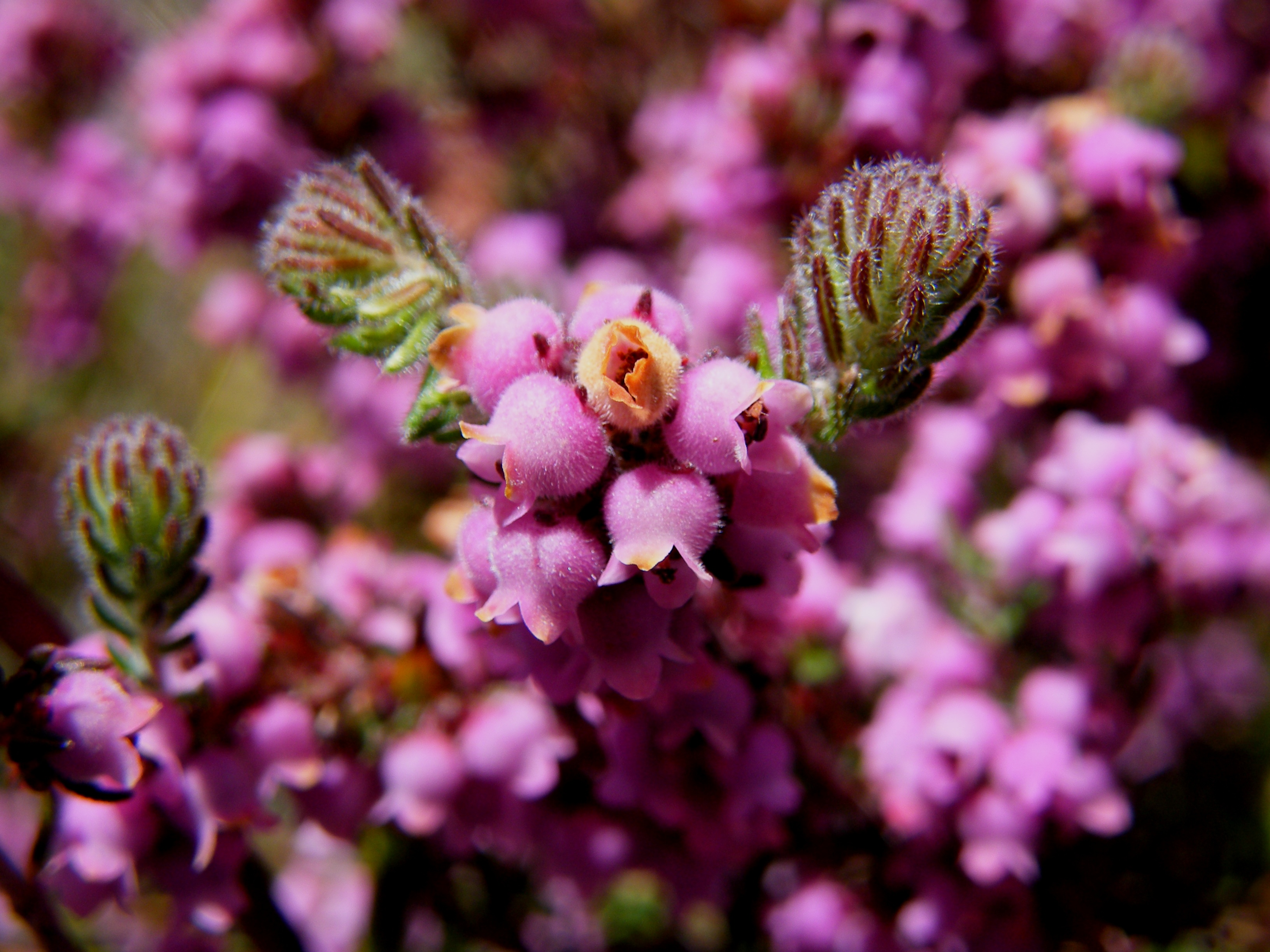

Scientific classification
- Kingdom: Plantae
- Clade: Tracheophytes
- Clade: Angiosperms
- Clade: Eudicots
- Clade: Asterids
- Order: Ericales
- Family: Ericaceae
- Genus: Erica
- Species: E. mollis

Binomial name
- Erica mollis Andrews

= Erica mollis =

Soft Heath

Species of flowering plant

Erica mollis, the soft heath, is a species of Erica that is naturally restricted to the city of Cape Town, occurring nowhere else in the world.
