= Erica marifolia =

Scientific classification
- Kingdom: Plantae
- Clade: Tracheophytes
- Clade: Angiosperms
- Clade: Eudicots
- Clade: Asterids
- Order: Ericales
- Family: Ericaceae
- Genus: Erica
- Species: E. marifolia

Binomial name
- Erica marifolia Aiton

Synonyms
- Ceramia helianthemifolia G.Don; Ceramia marifolia G.Don; Erica helianthemifolia Salisb.; Ericoides marifolium (Sol.) Kuntze

Species of flowering plant

Erica marifolia is a plant belonging to the genus Erica and is part of the fynbos. The species is endemic to the Western Cape and the Cape Peninsula, the eastern slopes of Table Mountain and Disa Gorge, at Constantiaberg and the cliffs above Kalk Bay and St. James. Some subpopulations have been disturbed by plantations and are currently threatened by erosion following the occurrence of fires.
