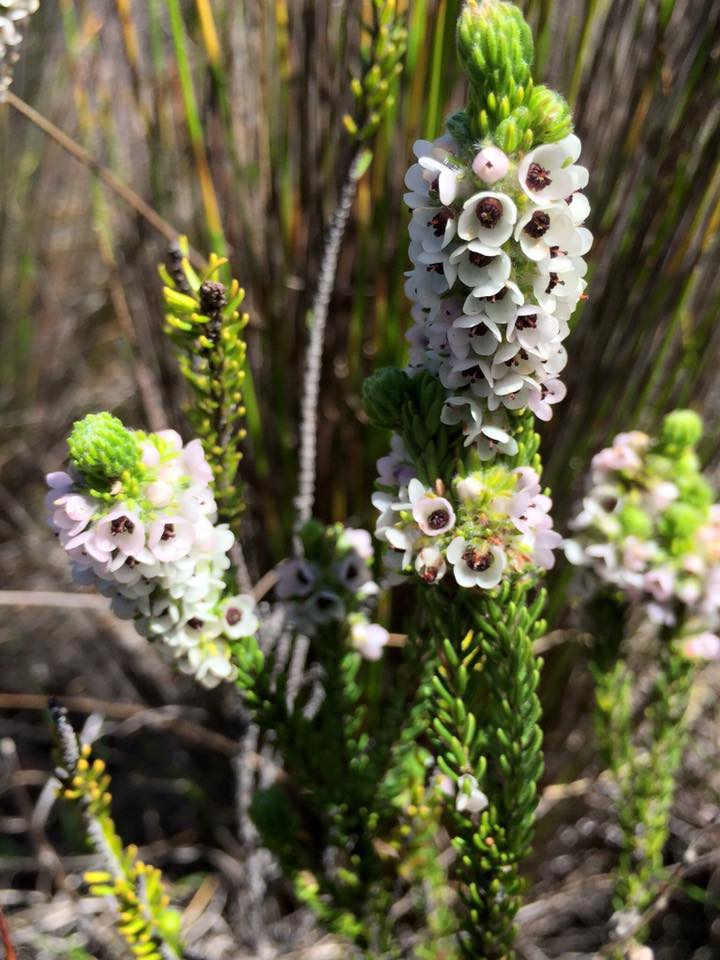

Scientific classification
- Kingdom: Plantae
- Clade: Tracheophytes
- Clade: Angiosperms
- Clade: Eudicots
- Clade: Asterids
- Order: Ericales
- Family: Ericaceae
- Genus: Erica
- Species: E. pyxidiflora

Binomial name
- Erica pyxidiflora Salisb., (1802)

Synonyms
- Erica empetroides Andrews; Ericoides empetroides (Andrews) Kuntze

= Erica pyxidiflora =

Species of flowering plant

Erica pyxidiflora is a plant belonging to the genus Erica and is part of the fynbos. The species is endemic to the Western Cape and occurs on the Cape Peninsula. The plant is threatened at Fish Hoek and Simon's Town by suburban development. Invasive plants remain a constant threat, currently the population is considered safe. The plant is considered rare.
