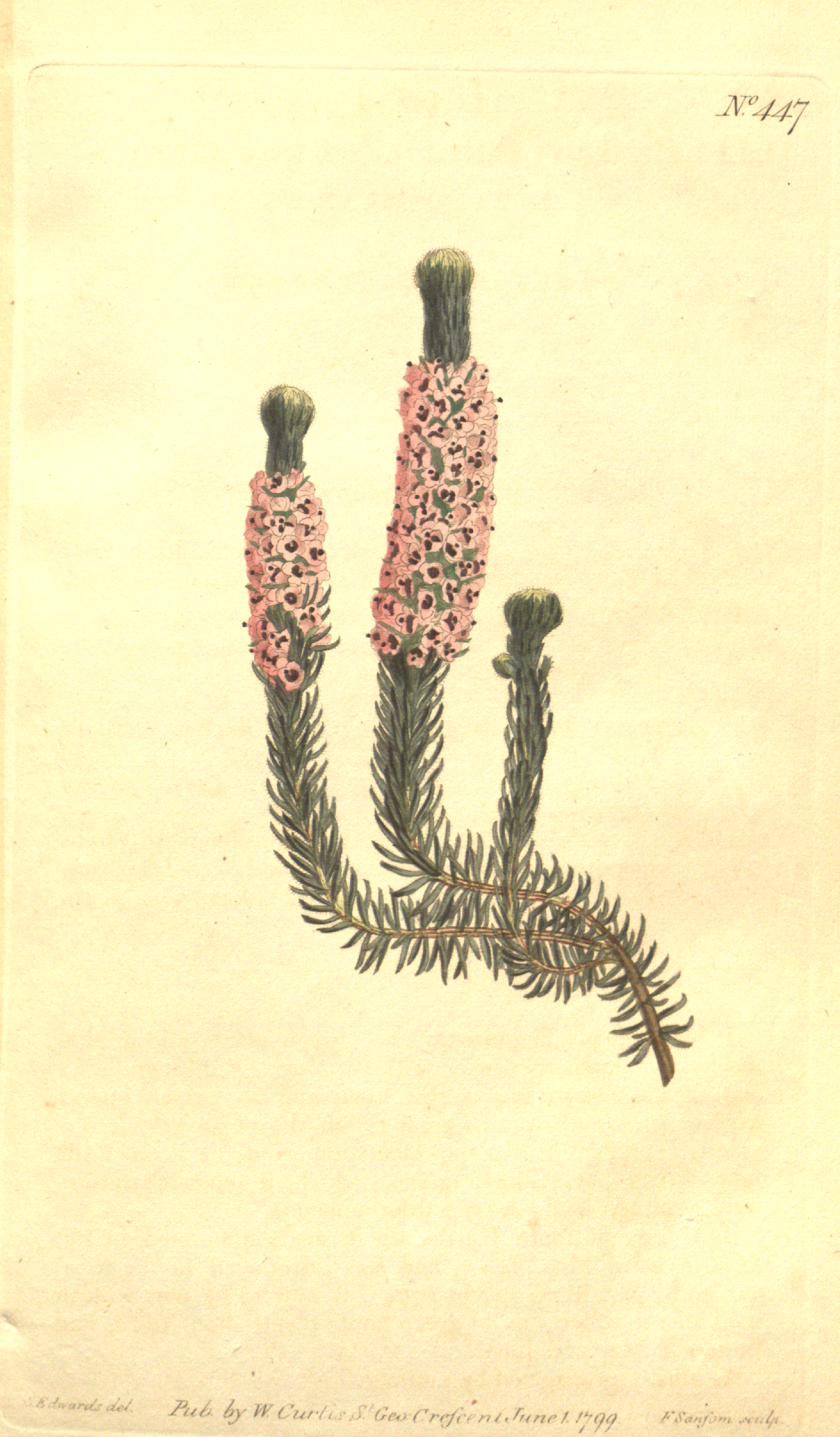

Scientific classification
- Kingdom: Plantae
- Clade: Tracheophytes
- Clade: Angiosperms
- Clade: Eudicots
- Clade: Asterids
- Order: Ericales
- Family: Ericaceae
- Genus: Erica
- Species: E. empetrina

Binomial name
- Erica empetrina L.

Synonyms
- Erica empetrifolia L.; Erica intertexta Loudon; Erica malleolaris Salisb.; Erica mollearis Pers.; Ericoides empetrifolium (L.) Kuntze; Gypsocallis intertexta (Loudon) G.Don

= Erica empetrina =

Crowberry Heath

Species of flowering plant

Erica empetrina, the crowberry heath is a plant belonging to the genus Erica and forming part of the fynbos. The species is endemic to the Western Cape.
