= Erica pilulifera =

Scientific classification
- Kingdom: Plantae
- Clade: Tracheophytes
- Clade: Angiosperms
- Clade: Eudicots
- Clade: Asterids
- Order: Ericales
- Family: Ericaceae
- Genus: Erica
- Species: E. pilulifera

Binomial name
- Erica pilulifera L.

Synonyms
- Erica nudicaulis P.J.Bergius; Erica pedunculata Andrews; Erica piluliformis Salisb.; Erica piluliformis Benth.; Erica unica Spreng.; Ericoides piluliferum (L.) Kuntze

Species of flowering plant

Erica pilulifera is a plant belonging to the genus Erica and is part of the fynbos. The species is endemic to the Western Cape and occurs on Table Mountain. The plant has a range of less than 4 km^{2} and there are five subpopulations. Parts of the habitat are used by hikers and one subpopulation has been virtually wiped out. This remains the plant's greatest threat.
