= Erica clavisepala =

Scientific classification
- Kingdom: Plantae
- Clade: Tracheophytes
- Clade: Angiosperms
- Clade: Eudicots
- Clade: Asterids
- Order: Ericales
- Family: Ericaceae
- Genus: Erica
- Species: E. clavisepala

Binomial name
- Erica clavisepala Guthrie & Bolus

Species of flowering plant

Erica clavisepala, the club heath and Cape Point marsh heath is a plant belonging to the genus Erica and forming part of the fynbos. The species is endemic to the Western Cape and occurs on the Cape Peninsula. The population is in the Table Mountain National Park where it is protected. The plant is rare.
