= Erica oxycoccifolia =

Scientific classification
- Kingdom: Plantae
- Clade: Tracheophytes
- Clade: Angiosperms
- Clade: Eudicots
- Clade: Asterids
- Order: Ericales
- Family: Ericaceae
- Genus: Erica
- Species: E. oxycoccifolia

Binomial name
- Erica oxycoccifolia Salisb.

Synonyms
- Ceramia oxycoccifolia G.Don; Ericoides oxycoccifolium (Salisb.) Kuntze

Species of flowering plant

Erica oxycoccifolia is a plant belonging to the genus Erica and is part of the fynbos. The species is endemic to the Western Cape.
