= Erica annectens =

Scientific classification
- Kingdom: Plantae
- Clade: Tracheophytes
- Clade: Angiosperms
- Clade: Eudicots
- Clade: Asterids
- Order: Ericales
- Family: Ericaceae
- Genus: Erica
- Species: E. annectens

Binomial name
- Erica annectens Guthrie & Bolus, (1905)

Species of flowering plant

Erica annectens is a plant belonging to the genus Erica and forming part of the fynbos. The species is endemic to the Cape Peninsula where it occurs from Noordehoek to Simon's Town. The plant's habitat is threatened by invasive plants and excessive veld fires.
