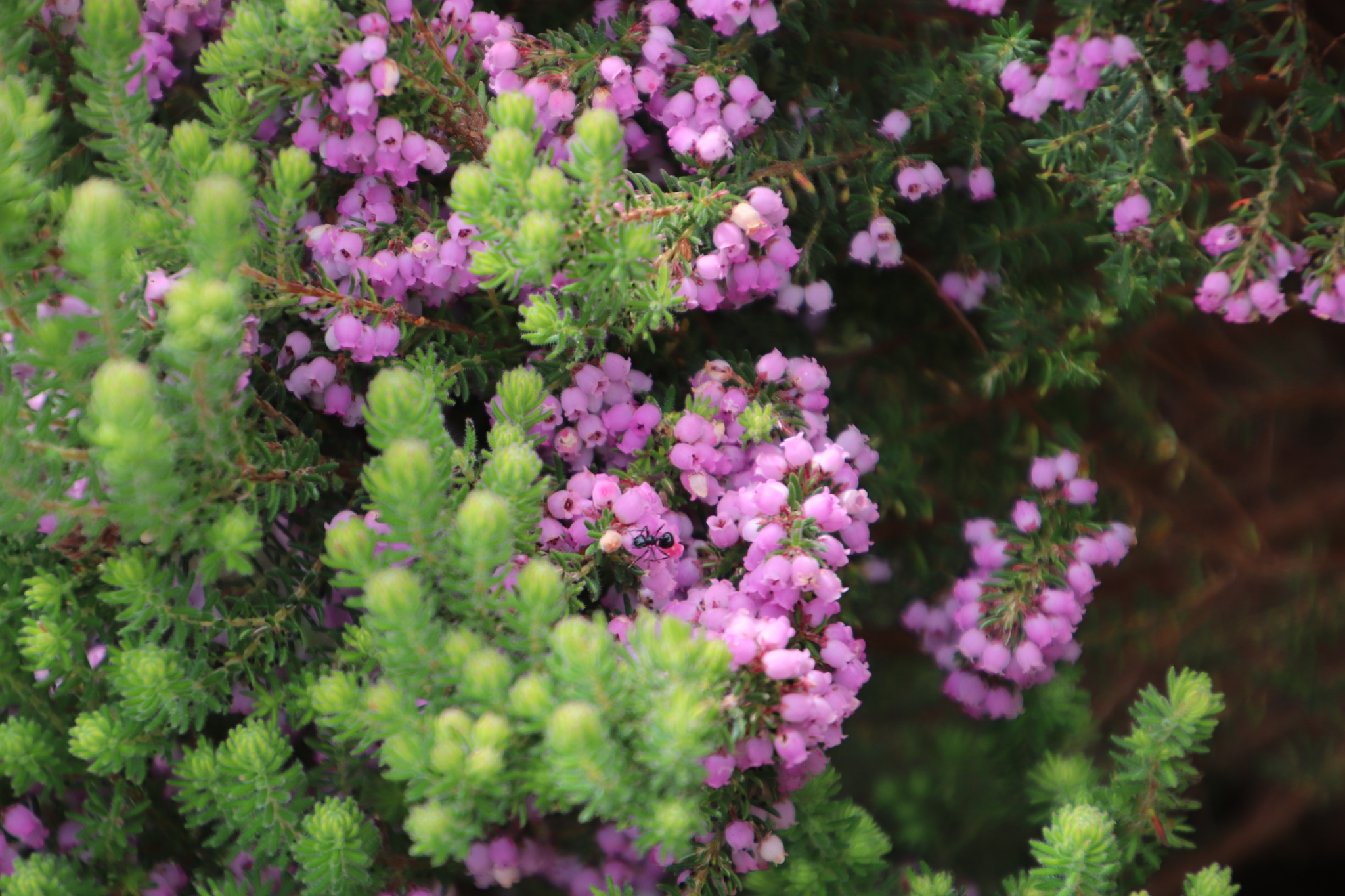

Scientific classification
- Kingdom: Plantae
- Clade: Tracheophytes
- Clade: Angiosperms
- Clade: Eudicots
- Clade: Asterids
- Order: Ericales
- Family: Ericaceae
- Genus: Erica
- Species: E. caterviflora

Binomial name
- Erica caterviflora Salisb.

Synonyms
- Ericoides caterviflorum (Salisb.) Kuntze; Ericoides craterviflorum (Salisb.) Kuntze

= Erica caterviflora =

Species of flowering plant

Erica caterviflora, the bunch heath, is a flowering shrub belonging to the genus Erica and forming part of the fynbos. The species is endemic to the Western Cape and occurs in the Cape Peninsula where it grows on the southern slopes of Table Mountain. The shrub is erect and grows 2 to 4.0 m tall, it is actually a small tree, with the trunk that can grow up to 150 cm thick. The shrub flowers from January to March. The flowers are densely packed on the trunk. Fire destroys the plant but the seeds survive. The plant gets its name from the word caterva which means group. Pollination is done by insects.
