= Erica heleogena =

Scientific classification
- Kingdom: Plantae
- Clade: Tracheophytes
- Clade: Angiosperms
- Clade: Eudicots
- Clade: Asterids
- Order: Ericales
- Family: Ericaceae
- Genus: Erica
- Species: E. heleogena

Binomial name
- Erica heleogena T.M.Salter

Species of flowering plant

Erica heleogena is a plant belonging to the genus Erica and forming part of the fynbos. The species is endemic to the Western Cape and occurs in the Cape Peninsula at the Klawervlei. The plant's range is less than 1 km². The habitat is threatened by an invasive plant, Acacia saligna, and also by possible loss of the area due to a possible pumped storage scheme.
