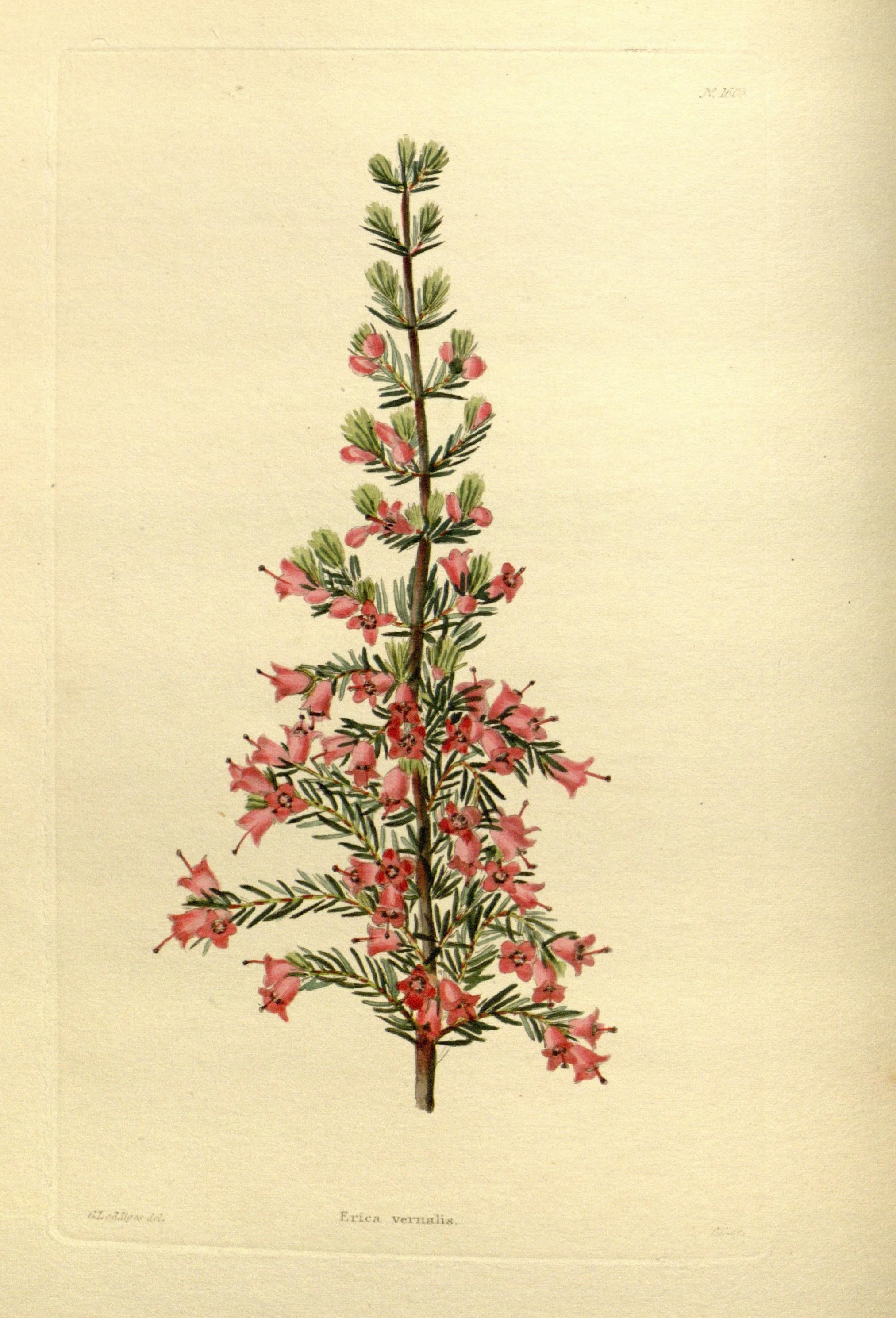

Conservation status
- Extinct (SANBI Red List)

Scientific classification
- Kingdom: Plantae
- Clade: Tracheophytes
- Clade: Angiosperms
- Clade: Eudicots
- Clade: Asterids
- Order: Ericales
- Family: Ericaceae
- Genus: Erica
- Species: †E. pyramidalis

Binomial name
- †Erica pyramidalis Salisb.

= Erica pyramidalis =

Extinct species of flowering plant

Erica pyramidalis, the pyramid heath, was a species of Erica that was endemic to the city of Cape Town, South Africa. It was driven to extinction by the early 20th century, due to habitat destruction from the expanding city.
