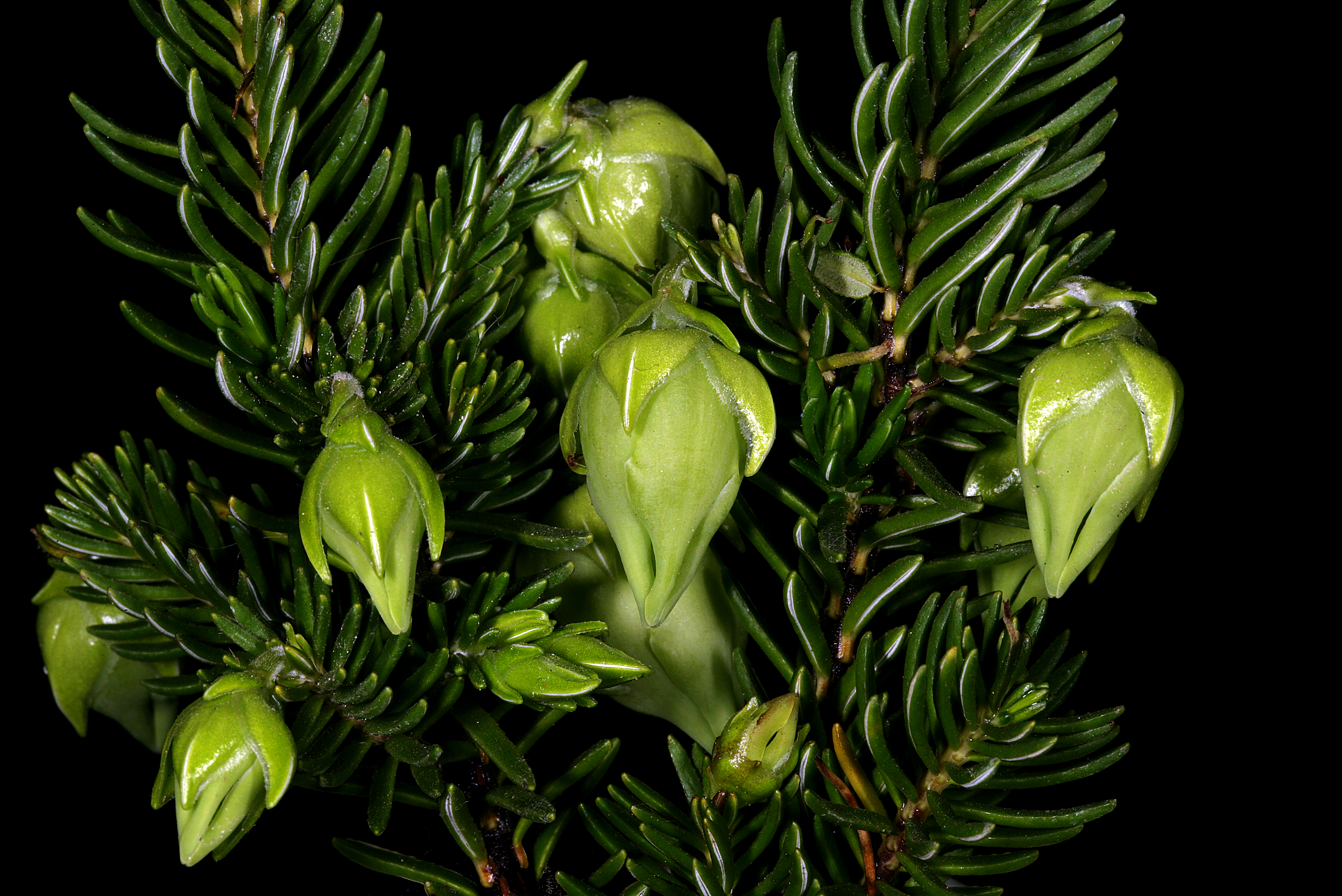

Scientific classification
- Kingdom: Plantae
- Clade: Tracheophytes
- Clade: Angiosperms
- Clade: Eudicots
- Clade: Asterids
- Order: Ericales
- Family: Ericaceae
- Genus: Erica
- Species: E. halicacaba

Binomial name
- Erica halicacaba L., (1760)

Synonyms
- Erica grossa Salisb.; Erica rupestris Salisb.; Ericoides halicacaba (L.) Kuntze; Eurylepis halicacaba D.Don

= Erica halicacaba =

Species of flowering plant

Erica halicacaba, the bladder-heath or gooseberry heath, is a plant that belongs to the genus Erica and forms part of the fynbos. The species is endemic to the Western Cape and occurs in the Cape Peninsula on the south side of Table Mountain. The plant is rare but because it occurs in rock crevices it is not threatened by wildfires.
