= Erica subcapitata =

Scientific classification
- Kingdom: Plantae
- Clade: Tracheophytes
- Clade: Angiosperms
- Clade: Eudicots
- Clade: Asterids
- Order: Ericales
- Family: Ericaceae
- Genus: Erica
- Species: E. subcapitata

Binomial name
- Erica subcapitata (N.E.Br.) E.G.H.Oliv.

Synonyms
- Coccosperma forbesianum Klotzsch; Coccosperma hexandrum (Klotzsch) Druce; Coccosperma subcapitatum N.E.Br.; Salaxis hexandra Klotzsch

Species of flowering plant

Erica subcapitata, the pinhead heath, is a plant belonging to the genus Erica and is part of the fynbos. The species is endemic to the Western Cape.
