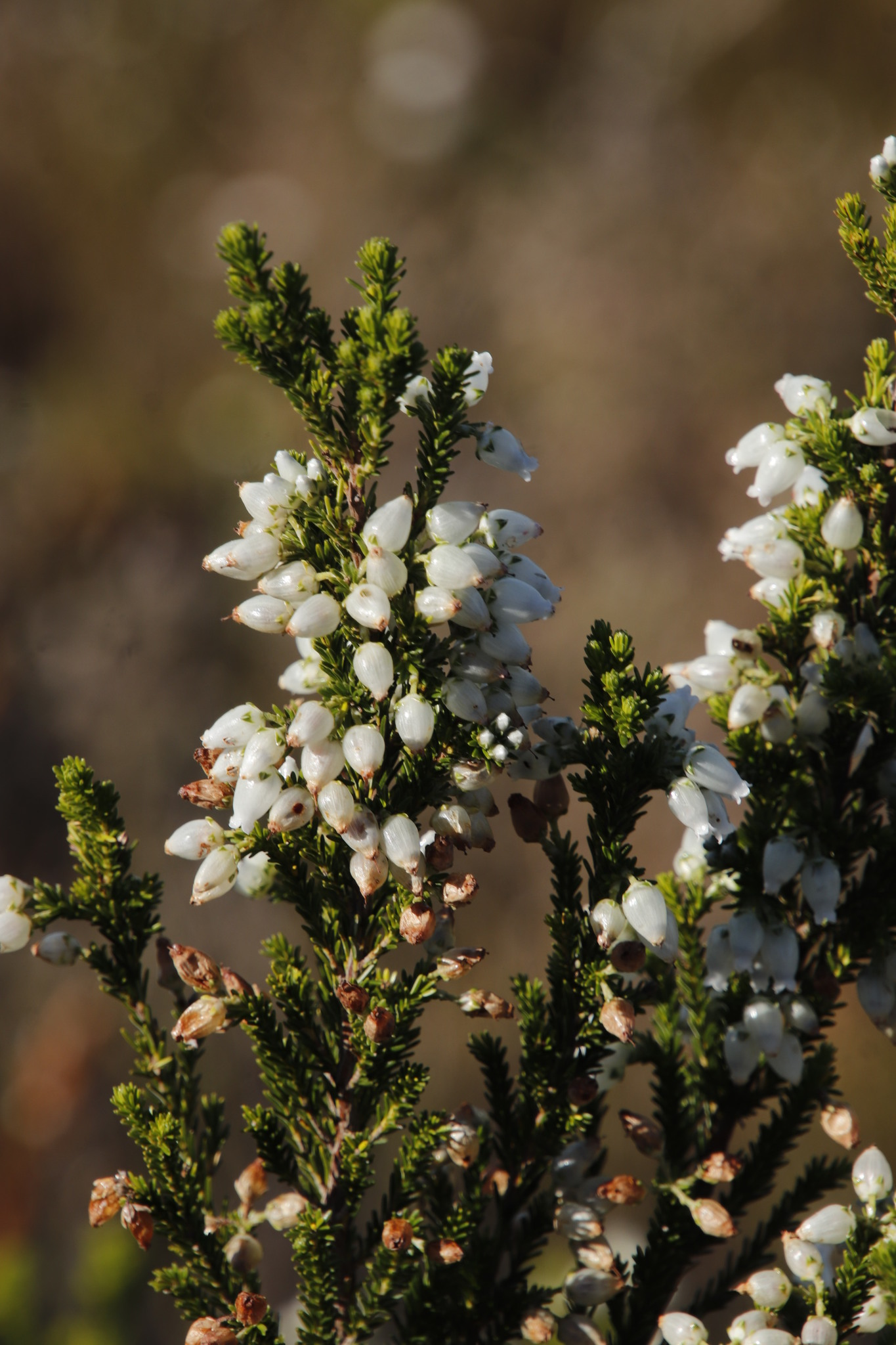

Scientific classification
- Kingdom: Plantae
- Clade: Tracheophytes
- Clade: Angiosperms
- Clade: Eudicots
- Clade: Asterids
- Order: Ericales
- Family: Ericaceae
- Genus: Erica
- Species: E. physodes

Binomial name
- Erica physodes L.

Synonyms
- Erica lambertia Andrews; Erica sequax Salisb.; Ericoides physodes (L.) Kuntze; Pachysa physodes G.Don

= Erica physodes =

Sticky White Heath

Species of flowering plant

Erica physodes, the sticky white heath, is a plant belonging to the genus Erica and is part of the fynbos. The species is endemic to the Western Cape. It can also be found in Free State.
