= Erica depressa =

Scientific classification
- Kingdom: Plantae
- Clade: Tracheophytes
- Clade: Angiosperms
- Clade: Eudicots
- Clade: Asterids
- Order: Ericales
- Family: Ericaceae
- Genus: Erica
- Species: E. depressa

Binomial name
- Erica depressa L., (1771)

Synonyms
- Erica cremnophila Esterh. & J.H.Salter; Erica humilis Salisb.; Erica rupestris Andrews; Erica semisulcata Drège ex Benth.; Ericoides depressum (L.) Kuntze; Ericoides humile (Salisb.) Kuntze

Species of flowering plant

Erica depressa is a plant belonging to the genus Erica and forming part of the fynbos. The species is endemic to the Western Cape and occurs in the northern part of the Cape Peninsula. The plant is rare but its habitat is not threatened.
