= Erica amoena =

Scientific classification
- Kingdom: Plantae
- Clade: Tracheophytes
- Clade: Angiosperms
- Clade: Eudicots
- Clade: Asterids
- Order: Ericales
- Family: Ericaceae
- Genus: Erica
- Species: E. amoena

Binomial name
- Erica amoena J.C.Wendl., (1798)

Synonyms
- Erica plumosa Andrews

Species of flowering plant

Erica amoena is a plant that belongs to the genus Erica and forms part of the fynbos. The plant is endemic to the Western Cape and occurs, among other things, in the Table Mountain National Park. The plant is considered rare.
