= Erica limosa =

Scientific classification
- Kingdom: Plantae
- Clade: Tracheophytes
- Clade: Angiosperms
- Clade: Eudicots
- Clade: Asterids
- Order: Ericales
- Family: Ericaceae
- Genus: Erica
- Species: E. limosa

Binomial name
- Erica limosa L.Bolus

Species of flowering plant

Erica limosa is a plant belonging to the genus Erica and is part of the fynbos. The species is endemic to the Western Cape. Here it occurs in the Cape Peninsula from Constantiaberg to Muizenberg. The plant has a range of 7.5 km^{2} and there are four subpopulations. The population numbers have decreased due to dam construction, the construction of 4x4 routes and invasive plants such as pine trees, Acacia saligna, Acacia mearnsii. It is also threatened by the high incidence of veld fires.
