= Erica paludicola =

Scientific classification
- Kingdom: Plantae
- Clade: Tracheophytes
- Clade: Angiosperms
- Clade: Eudicots
- Clade: Asterids
- Order: Ericales
- Family: Ericaceae
- Genus: Erica
- Species: E. paludicola

Binomial name
- Erica paludicola L.Bolus

Species of flowering plant

Erica paludicola is a plant belonging to the genus Erica and is part of the fynbos. The species is endemic to the Western Cape where it occurs in the Cape Peninsula, from Noordhoek Peak to the Silwermyn Valley. There are two subpopulations. The population at Silwermyn was large but road construction, invasive plants, polluted stormwater and fires in 2000 have resulted in the population now being less than 130 plants. The habitat is still threatened by suburban development, invasive plants and polluted stormwater.
