= Serruria cyanoides =

Conservation status
- Vulnerable (IUCN 3.1)

Scientific classification
- Kingdom: Plantae
- Clade: Tracheophytes
- Clade: Angiosperms
- Clade: Eudicots
- Order: Proteales
- Family: Proteaceae
- Genus: Serruria
- Species: S. cyanoides

Binomial name
- Serruria cyanoides (L.) R.Br.

Synonyms
- Leucadendron cyanoides L.; Protea cyanoides L.

Species of flowering plant

Serruria cyanoides, the Wynberg spiderhead, is a flower-bearing shrub that belongs to the genus Serruria and forms part of the fynbos.

== Background ==
The plant is native to the Western Cape, it has always been found on the Cape Flats and Cape Peninsula but currently there are only two populations at Fish Hoek and the Karbonkelberg at Hout Bay. The shrub is erect and grows only 50 cm tall and bears flowers from July to October.

Fire destroys the plant but the seeds survive. Two months after flowering, the fruit falls off and ants disperse the seeds. They store the seeds in their nests. The plant is unisexual. Pollination takes place through the action of insects. The plant grows in sandy soil at altitudes of 0–150 m.
