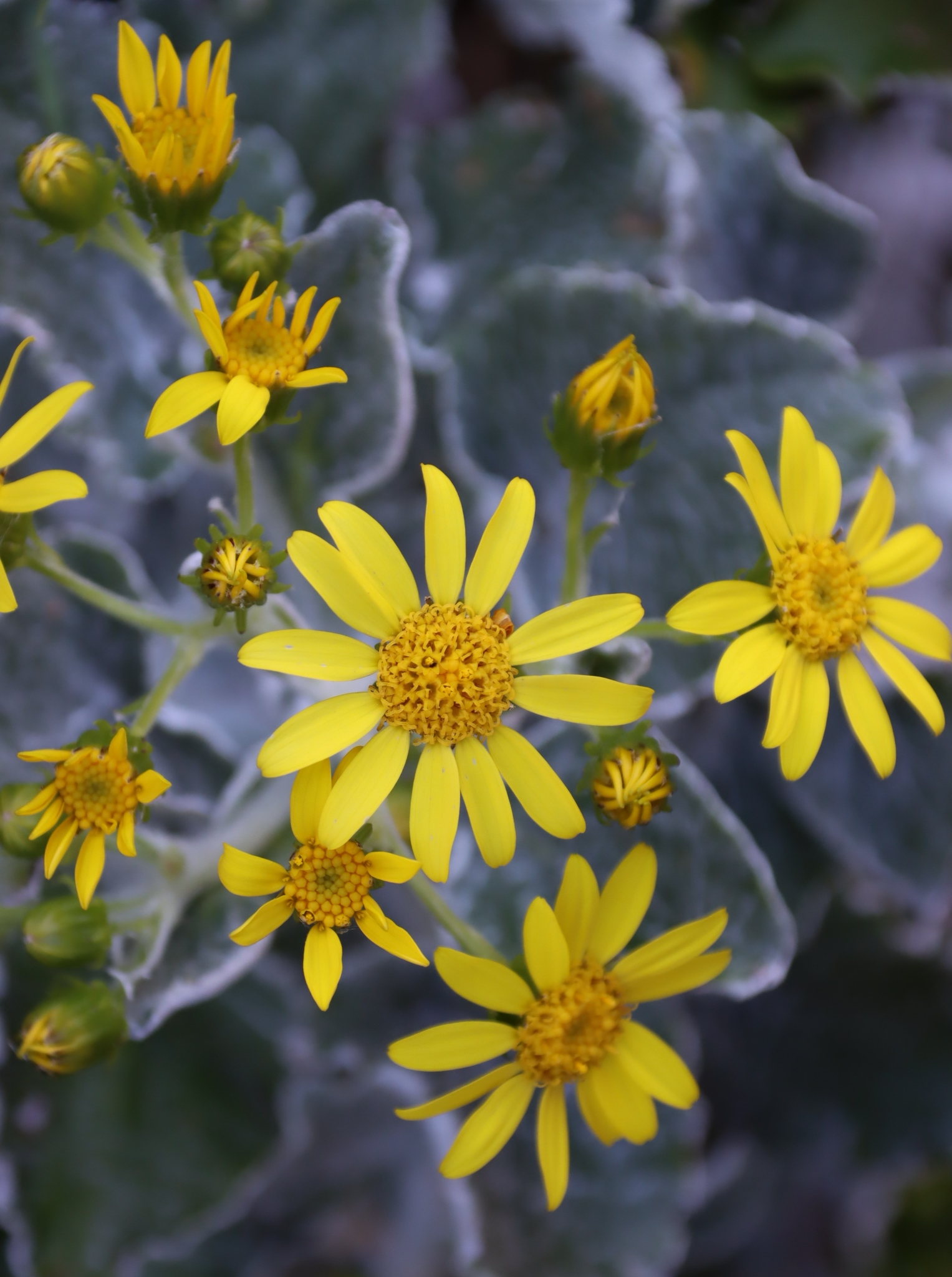

Scientific classification
- Kingdom: Plantae
- Clade: Tracheophytes
- Clade: Angiosperms
- Clade: Eudicots
- Clade: Asterids
- Order: Asterales
- Family: Asteraceae
- Genus: Senecio
- Species: S. verbascifolius

Binomial name
- Senecio verbascifolius Burm.fil.

Synonyms
- Cineraria hypoleuca Sieber ex Harv. & Sond.; Cineraria tussilaginea Thunb.; Senecio lanatus Burm.; Senecio lanatus Burm. ex DC.; Senecio populifolius Burm.; Senecio populifolius Burm. ex DC.

= Senecio verbascifolius =

South African plant species

Senecio verbascifolius, the mullein ragwort, is a species of plant from South Africa.

== Description ==
This perennial species grows to be up to 60 cm (24 in) tall. The leaves are oval shaped or heart shaped with minute teeth along the margins. Flowers are present between September and December. They are yellow and grow in branched corymbs. The involucre is calyx-like. The bracts are thickened below.

== Distribution and habitat ==
This species is endemic to the Western Cape of South Africa. It grows on sheltered south facing rocky slopes on the Cape Peninsula and the Hottentots Holland Mountains. It is a habitat specialist with a range of 347 km^{2} (134 sq mi).

== Conservation ==
This species is considered to be endangered by the South African National Biodiversity Institute due to its small range and specialist nature. Only about 250 individuals occur in the wild, but the population appears to be stable and does not currently face any threats.
