= Erica fontana =

Scientific classification
- Kingdom: Plantae
- Clade: Tracheophytes
- Clade: Angiosperms
- Clade: Eudicots
- Clade: Asterids
- Order: Ericales
- Family: Ericaceae
- Genus: Erica
- Species: E. fontana

Binomial name
- Erica fontana L.Bolus

Species of flowering plant

Erica fontana, the fountain heath, is a plant belonging to the genus Erica and forms part of the fynbos. The species is endemic to the Western Cape and occurs in the Cape Peninsula. The area of occurrence is 21 km2 where there are approximately 17 000 plants. The plant grows luxuriantly after a fire and the habitat in the Cape of Good Hope section of the Table Mountain National Park is well protected and safe. The plant is considered rare.
