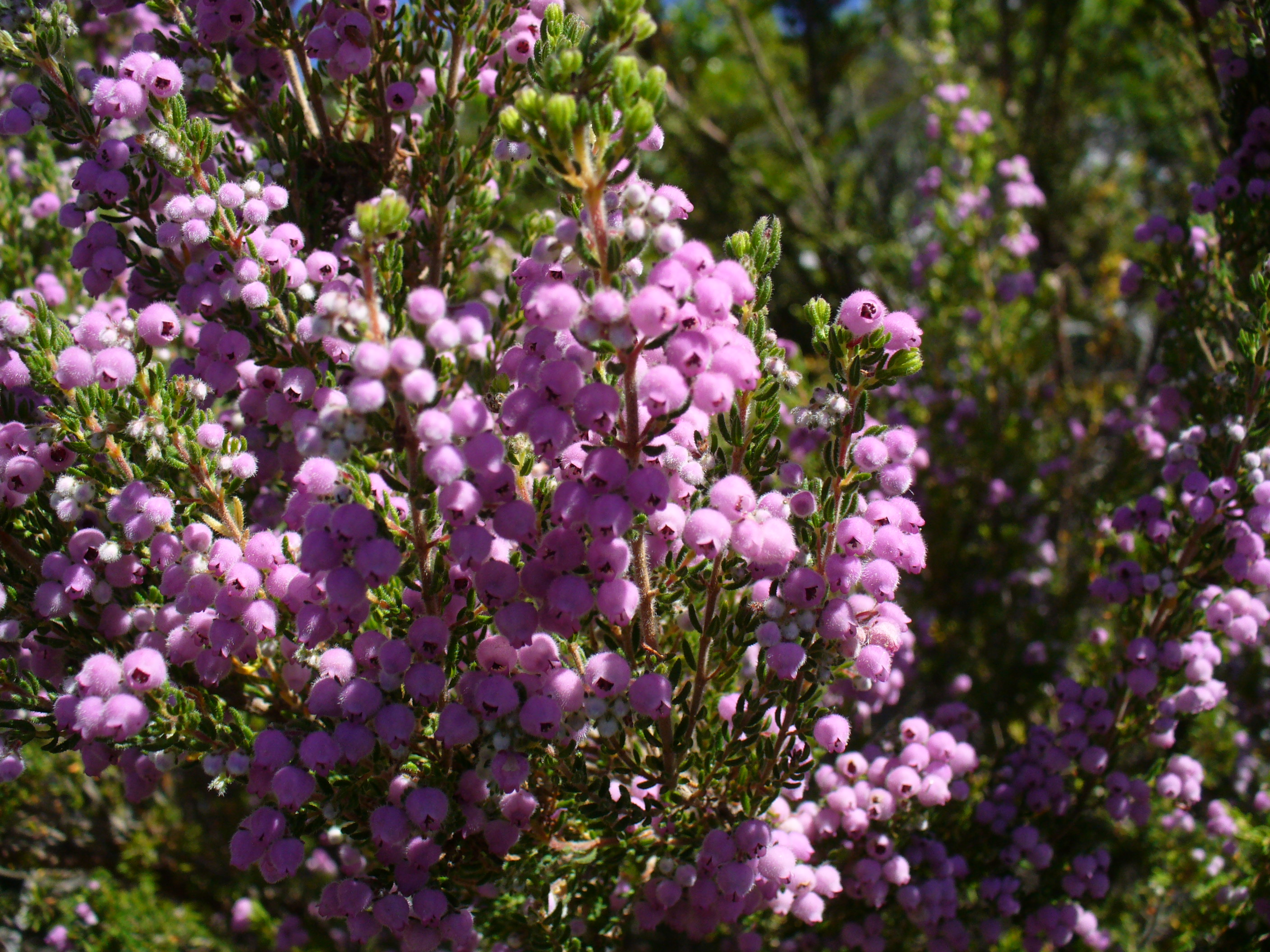

Scientific classification
- Kingdom: Plantae
- Clade: Tracheophytes
- Clade: Angiosperms
- Clade: Eudicots
- Clade: Asterids
- Order: Ericales
- Family: Ericaceae
- Genus: Erica
- Species: E. hirtiflora

Binomial name
- Erica hirtiflora Curtis

= Erica hirtiflora =

Species of flowering plant

Erica hirtiflora, the hairy-flower heath, is a species of Erica that was naturally restricted to the south-western corner of the Western Cape, South Africa around the city of Cape Town.

It produces flowers at any time of year - and in such quantities that the whole bush turns pink. Consequently, it is becoming a popular ornamental plant for Capetonian gardens.
