= Disa ecalcarata =

Scientific classification
- Kingdom: Plantae
- Clade: Tracheophytes
- Clade: Angiosperms
- Clade: Monocots
- Order: Asparagales
- Family: Orchidaceae
- Subfamily: Orchidoideae
- Genus: Disa
- Species: D. ecalcarata

Binomial name
- Disa ecalcarata (G.J.Lewis) H.P.Linder

Synonyms
- Monadenia ecalcarata G.J.Lewis

Species of flowering plant

Disa ecalcarata, commonly known as the spurless disa, was a perennial plant and geophyte belonging to the genus Disa and was part of the fynbos. The plant was endemic to the Western Cape and occurred on the Cape Peninsula. The plant is considered extinct.
