= Erica diosmifolia =

Scientific classification
- Kingdom: Plantae
- Clade: Tracheophytes
- Clade: Angiosperms
- Clade: Eudicots
- Clade: Asterids
- Order: Ericales
- Family: Ericaceae
- Genus: Erica
- Species: E. diosmifolia

Binomial name
- Erica diosmifolia Salisb.

Synonyms
- Erica serrulata J.Forbes; Ericoides diosmifolium (Salisb.) Kuntze; Eurylepis diosmifolia G.Don

Species of flowering plant

Erica diosmifolia is a plant belonging to the genus Erica and forming part of the fynbos. The species is endemic to the Western Cape and occurs in the Cape Peninsula, Table Mountain and Constantiaberg. The plant's range is 33 km² and the habitat is threatened by fires, which confirms the plant's status as rare.
