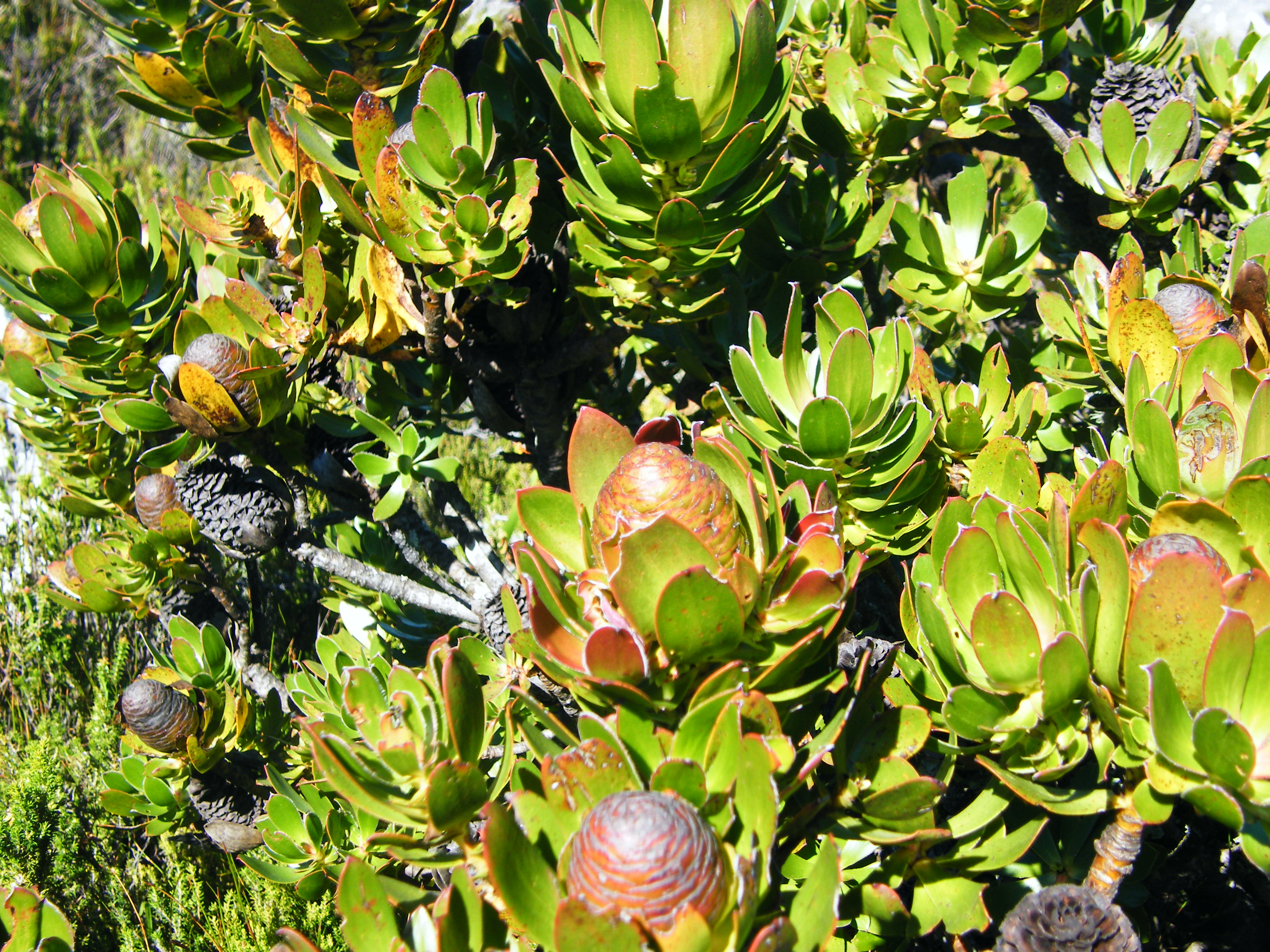

Conservation status
- Near Threatened (IUCN 3.1)

Scientific classification
- Kingdom: Plantae
- Clade: Tracheophytes
- Clade: Angiosperms
- Clade: Eudicots
- Order: Proteales
- Family: Proteaceae
- Genus: Leucadendron
- Species: L. strobilinum

Binomial name
- Leucadendron strobilinum (L.) Druce

Synonyms
- Leucadendron concolor R. Br.; Leucadendron squarrosum R. Br.

= Leucadendron strobilinum =

Species of flowering plant

Leucadendron strobilinum, commonly called the peninsula conebush, is a plant species in the genus Leucadendron—forming part of the family Proteaceae. Confined to the Cape Peninsula of South Africa, it reaches a height of up to 2.6 metres (8 ft 6 in) growing in southern, damp rocky slopes at an elevation of 500 to 1100m. Its conservation status is Near Threatened—a result of inappropriate fire management, fire-break clearing and alien plant invasions.

== Appearance ==
A large, single-stemmed shrub reaching a height of up to 2.6m. It branches near the base and has dark-green elliptical leaves.

== Ecology ==
As with all leucadendron, the peninsula conebush is dioecious. Flowering takes place between September and October, with flowers described as yeast scented. Seeds are stored on the (female) plant, an adaptation known as serotiny, to be released upon a fire occurring; the seeds are winged allowing for wind dispersal.
