= Erica fairii =

Scientific classification
- Kingdom: Plantae
- Clade: Tracheophytes
- Clade: Angiosperms
- Clade: Eudicots
- Clade: Asterids
- Order: Ericales
- Family: Ericaceae
- Genus: Erica
- Species: E. fairii

Binomial name
- Erica fairii Bolus

Species of flowering plant

Erica fairii, the fairy heath and Fair's erica, is a plant belonging to the genus Erica and forming part of the fynbos. The species is endemic to the Western Cape and there is only one population that occurs at the Red Hill Plateau between Kommetjie and Simon's Town. The habitat is threatened by invasive plants and excessive bushfires.
