= Table Bay Nature Reserve =

Nature reserve in Western Cape, South Africa

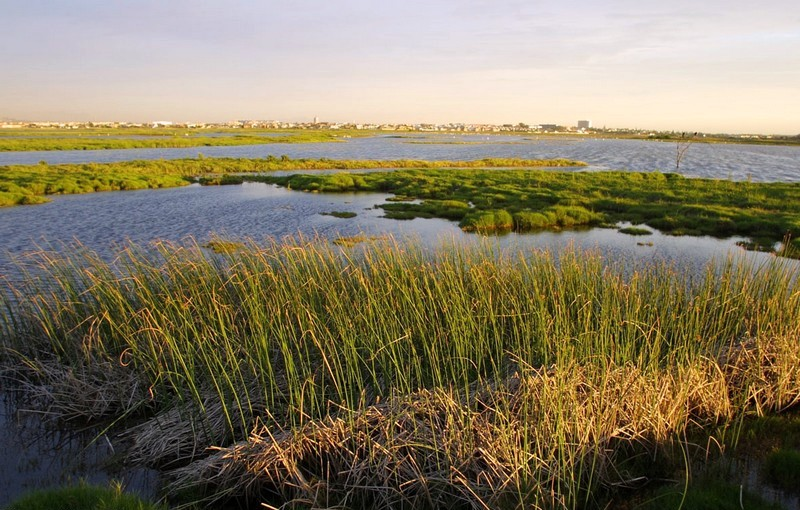

- Location within Cape Town Location within Western Cape
- Location: Milnerton, Western Cape, South Africa
- Coordinates: 33°50′45″S 18°30′01″E
- Area: 880 hectares (8.8 km^{2})
- Governing body: City of Cape Town
- Website: www.capetown.gov.za/en/environmentalresourcemanagement/Pages/default.aspx

The Table Bay Nature Reserve is an 880-hectare (2,200-acre) nature reserve in Milnerton, Western Cape, South Africa. It consists of several smaller constituent reserves including Rietvlei Wetland Reserve, Diep River Fynbos Corridor, Zoarvlei Wetlands, Milnerton Racecourse Nature Reserve, and Milnerton Lagoon, as well as surrounding protected areas. These adjacent reserves were amalgamated on 27 June 2012, in order to improve the biodiversity management in the built-up area. It is managed by the City of Cape Town's Environmental Resource Management Department, with offices at Rietvlei.

The Table Bay Nature Reserve forms the southernmost buffer area of the Cape West Coast Biosphere Reserve, and links it to the edge of Cape Town's city centre. It also contains a large portion of the critically endangered lowland habitats remaining in Cape Town.

The central feature in the Table Bay Nature Reserve is the Rietvlei wetland system. The Rietvlei Wetlands and Milnerton Lagoon were proclaimed as a Nature Area on 3 August 1984, in proclamation number 1632 of Provincial Gazette No. 9345. The Nature Reserve is partly owned by the City of Cape Town and the World Wildlife Fund for Nature – South Africa, who own two of the Erven. The City of Cape Town manages these two Erven on a 99-year lease for the purposes of nature conservation.

== Biodiversity ==
Fauna and flora in the reserve include the following:

=== Mammals ===
==== Indigenous ====
Bathyergidae

- Bathyergus suillus (Cape dune mole-rat)
- Cryptomys hottentotus (common mole-rat)
- Georychus capensis (Cape mole-rat)

Bovidae

- Raphicerus campestris (steenbok)
- Raphicerus melanotis (Cape grysbok)
- Sylvicapra grimmia (common duiker)

Canidae

- Vulpes chama (Cape fox)

Chrysochloridae

- Cryptochloris asiatica a.k.a. Chrysochloris asiatica (Cape golden mole)

Felidae

- Felis caracal (caracal)

Herpestidae

- Atilax paludinosus (water mongoose)
- Cynictis penicillata (yellow mongoose)
- Galerella pulverulenta (Cape grey mongoose)
- Herpestes ichneumon (Egyptian mongoose)

Hystricidae

- Hystrix africaeaustralis (Cape porcupine)

Leporidae

- Lepus capensis (Cape hare)
- Lepus saxatilis (scrub hare)

Muridae

- Dendromus melanotis (grey climbing mouse)
- Mus musculus (house mouse)
- Otomys irroratus (vlei rat)
- Otomys unisulcatus (bush vlei rat)
- Rattus rattus (black rat)
- Rhabdomys pumilio (striped field mouse)
- Tatera afra (Cape gerbil)
- Mus indutus (desert pygmy mouse)

Mustelidae;

- Aonyx capensis (Cape clawless otter)
- Mellivora capensis (honey badger)

Soricidae

- Myosorex varius (forest shrew)

Vespertilionidae

- Eptesicus capensis (Cape serotine bat)

Viverridae

- Genetta genetta (small-spotted genet)
- Genetta tigrina (Cape genet)

==== Introduced ====
Canidae

- Canis lupus familiaris a.k.a. Canis familiaris (domestic dog)

Felidae

- Felis silvestris catus a.k.a. Felis catus (domestic cat)

=== Reptiles ===
Chamaeleonidae

- Bradypodion pumilum (Cape dwarf chameleon)
- Bradypodion occidentale (Namaqua dwarf chameleon)

Colubridae

- Psammophylax rhombeatus (rhombic skaapsteker)
- Crotaphopeltis hotamboeia (herald snake)
- Dasypeltis scabra (common eggeater)
- Dispholidus typus (boomslang)
- Duberria lutrix lutrix (common slugeater)
- Lamprophis aurora (Aurora house snake)
- Lamprophis fuscus (yellow-bellied house snake)
- Lamprophis inornatus (olive house snake)
- Lycodonomorphus rufulus (common brown water snake)
- Psammophis crucifer (cross-marked grass snake), (crossmarked grass snake)
- Psammophis leightoni (Cape sand snake)
- Psammophis notostictus (Karoo sand snake)
- Pseudaspis cana (mole snake)
- Chamaesaura anguina (Cape grass lizard)

Elapidae

- Homoroselaps lacteus (spotted harlequin snake)
- Naja nivea (Cape cobra)

Gekkonidae

- Afrogecko porphyreus (marbled leaf-toed gecko), (marbled leaftoed gecko)
- Pachydactylus geitje (ocellated thick-toed gecko), (ocellated thicktoed gecko)

Gerrhosauridae

- Gerrhosaurus flavigularis (yellow-throated plated lizard)

Lacertidae

- Meroles knoxii (Knox's desert lizard)

Leptotyphlopidae

- Leptotyphlops nigricans (black thread snake)

Pelomedusidae

- Pelomedusa subrufa (marsh terrapin)

Scincidae

- Acontias meleagris meleagris (Cape legless skink)
- Scelotes bipes (silvery dwarf burrowing skink)
- Trachylepis capensis (Cape skink)
- Typhlosaurus caecus (Cuvier's blind legless skink)
- Trachylepis homalocephala (red-sided skink), (redsided skink)

Testudinidae

- Chersina angulata (angulate tortoise)
- Homopus areolatus (parrot-beaked tortoise), (parrotbeaked tortoise)

Typhlopidae

- Rhinotyphlops lalandei (Delalande's beaked blind snake), (Delalande's blind snake)

Viperidae

- Bitis armata (southern adder)

=== Amphibians ===
Brevicipitidae

- Breviceps rosei (sand rain frog)

Bufonidae

- Vandijkophrynus angusticeps (sand toad)
- Amietophrynus pantherinus (western leopard toad) endangered (EN)
- Amietophrynus rangeri (raucous toad)

Pipidae

- Xenopus laevis (common platanna)

Pyxicephalidae bonaparte

- Cacosternum platys (caco) sp., (flat caco)
- Strongylopus grayii grayii (clicking stream frog)
- Tomopterna delalandii (Cape sand frog)
- Amietia fuscigula (Cape river frog)

=== Fish ===
==== Indigenous ====
Anabantidae

- Sandelia capensis (Cape kurper)

Anguillidae

- Anguilla mossambica steinitzi (longfin eel)

Clupeidae

- Gilchristella aestuaria (estuarine round-herring)

Galaxiidae

- Galaxias zebratus (Cape galaxias)

Gobiidae

- Caffrogobius nudiceps (barehead goby)

Mugilidae

- Liza richardsonii (southern mullet)
- Mugil cephalus (flathead mullet)

Sparidae

- Lithognathus lithognathus (white steenbras)
- Rhabdosargus globiceps (white stumpnose)

==== Introduced ====
Cichlidae

- Oreochromis mossambicus (Mozambique tilapia)
- Tilapia sparrmanii (banded tilapia)

Clariidae

- Clarias gariepinus (sharp-tooth catfish)

Cyprinidae

- Cyprinus carpio (carp)

Poeciliidae

- Gambusia affinis (mosquitofish)

=== Birds ===
Accipitridae

- Buteo rufofuscus (jackal buzzard)
- Buteo vulpinus (steppe buzzard)
- Circus ranivorus (African marsh-harrier) vulnerable (VU)
- Elanus caeruleus (black-winged kite)
- Haliaeetus vocifer (African fish eagle)
- Milvus migrans (black kite), (yellow-billed kite)
- Accipiter melanoleucus (black sparrowhawk)

Acrocephalidae

- Acrocephalus scirpaceus (Common reed warbler)
- Acrocephalus gracilirostris (lesser swamp warbler)

Alaudidae

- Calandrella cinerea (red-capped lark)

Alcedinidae

- Alcedo cristata (malachite kingfisher)

Anatidae

- Alopochen aegyptiacus (Egyptian goose), (Kolgans)
- Anas capensis (Cape teal)
- Anas erythrorhyncha (red-billed teal)
- Anas platyrhynchos (mallard)
- Anas smithii (Cape shoveler)
- Anas sparsa (African black duck)
- Anas undulata (yellow-billed duck)
- Plectropterus gambensis (spur-winged goose)
- Spatula hottentota (blue-billed teal)
- Netta erythrophthalma (southern pochard)
- Oxyura maccoa (Maccoa duck) near threatened (NT)
- Sarkidiornis melanotos (Knob-billed duck)
- Tadorna cana (South African shelduck)

Anhingidae

- Anhinga rufa (African darter)

Apodidae

- Apus affinis (little swift)
- Apus barbatus (African black swift)
- Apus caffer (white-rumped swift)
- Tachymarptis melba (Alpine swift)

Ardeidae

- Ardea cinerea (grey heron)
- Ardea melanocephala (black-headed heron)
- Ardea purpurea (purple heron)
- Bubulcus ibis (cattle egret)
- Egretta garzetta (little egret)
- Egretta intermedia (yellow-billed egret)
- Ixobrychus minutus (little bittern)
- Nycticorax nycticorax (black-crowned night heron)
- Ardea goliath (Goliath heron)
- Egretta alba (great egret)

Caprimulgidae

- Caprimulgus pectoralis (fiery-necked nightjar)

Centropodidae

- Centropus burchelli (Burchell's coucal)

Cerylidae

- Ceryle rudis (pied kingfisher)
- Megaceryle maximus (giant kingfisher)

Charadriidae

- Charadrius tricollaris (three-banded plover)
- Vanellus armatus (blacksmith lapwing), (blacksmith plover)
- Charadrius pecuarius (Kittlitz's plover)
- Vanellus coronatus (crowned lapwing)
- Charadrius hiaticula (common ringed plover)
- Charadrius marginatus (white-fronted plover)
- Charadrius pallidus (chestnut-banded plover) near threatened (NT)
- Pluvialis squatarola (grey plover)

Chionidae

- Burhinus capensis (spotted thick-knee), (spotted dikkop)
- Burhinus vermiculatus (water thick-knee), (water dikkop)

Ciconiidae

- Ciconia ciconia (white stork)
- Ciconia nigra (black stork) near threatened (NT)
- Mycteria ibis (yellow-billed stork)

Cisticolidae

- Apalis thoracica (bar-throated apalis)
- Cisticola tinniens (Levaillant's cisticola)
- Prinia maculosa (Karoo prinia)
- Cisticola juncidis (zitting cisticola)
- Cisticola subruficapilla (grey-backed cisticola)
- Cisticola textrix (cloud cisticola)

Coliidae

- Colius colius (white-backed mousebird)
- Colius striatus (speckled mousebird)
- Urocolius indicus (red-faced mousebird)

Columbidae

- Columba livia (feral pigeon), (rock dove)
- Oena capensis (Namaqua dove)
- Streptopelia capicola (Cape turtle dove)
- Streptopelia semitorquata (red-eyed dove)
- Streptopelia senegalensis (Lag Duifie), (laughing dove)
- Columba guinea (speckled pigeon)

Corvidae

- Corvus albus (pied crow)
- Corvus splendens (Indian house crow)
- Corvus albicollis (white-necked raven)

Cuculidae

- Chrysococcyx caprius (Diderick cuckoo)
- Chrysococcyx klaas (Klaas's cuckoo)
- Clamator jacobinus (Jacobin cuckoo)

Dendrocygnidae

- Dendrocygna viduata (white-faced duck)
- Thalassornis leuconotus (white-backed duck)
- Dendrocygna bicolor (fulvous duck)

Estrildidae

- Estrilda astrild (common waxbill)

Falconidae

- Falco biarmicus (Lanner falcon) near threatened (NT)
- Falco rupicolus (rock kestrel)
- Falco peregrinus (peregrine falcon) near threatened (NT)

Fringillidae

- Serinus canicollis (Cape canary)
- Crithagra flaviventris (yellow canary)
- Emberiza capensis (Cape bunting)
- Crithagra albogularis (white-throated canary)
- Serinus sulphuratus (brimstone canary)

Gruidae

- Anthropoides paradiseus (blue crane) vulnerable (VU)

Haematopodidae

- Haematopus moquini (African black oystercatcher) near threatened (NT)

Heliornithidae

- Fulica cristata (red-knobbed coot)
- Gallinula chloropus (common moorhen)
- Porphyrio madagascariensis (African purple swamphen)

Hirundinidae

- Hirundo albigularis (white-throated swallow)
- Hirundo cucullata (greater striped swallow)
- Hirundo dimidiata (pearl-breasted swallow)
- Hirundo rustica (barn swallow)
- Riparia paludicola (brown-throated martin)
- Delichon urbicum (common house-martin)
- Hirundo fuligula (rock martin)
- Riparia cincta (banded martin)
- Hirundo spilodera (South African cliff-swallow)

Indicatoridae

- Indicator indicator (greater honeyguide)

Laniidae

- Lanius collaris (southern fiscal), (fiscal shrike)

Laridae

- Larus cirrocephalus (grey-headed gull)
- Larus dominicanus (kelp gull)
- Larus hartlaubii (Hartlaub's gull)
- Chlidonias hybrida (whiskered tern)
- Chlidonias leucopterus (white-winged tern)
- Sterna balaenarum (Damara tern) near threatened (NT)
- Sterna bergii (swift tern)
- Sterna caspia (Caspian tern) near threatened (NT)
- Sterna hirundo (common tern)
- Sterna sandvicensis (Sandwich tern)
- Sterna vittata (Antarctic tern)

Locustellidae

- Bradypterus baboecala (little rush warbler)

Lybiidae

- Tricholaema leucomelas (acacia pied barbet)

Macrosphenidae

- Sphenoeacus afer (Cape grassbird)

Meropidae

- Merops apiaster (European bee-eater)

Monarchidae

- Laniarius ferrugineus (southern boubou)
- Telophorus zeylonus (bokmakierie)

Motacillidae

- Anthus cinnamomeus (African pipit)
- Macronyx capensis (Cape longclaw)
- Motacilla capensis (Cape wagtail)

Muscicapidae

- Cossypha caffra (Cape robin-chat)
- Saxicola torquatus (African stonechat)
- Sigelus silens (fiscal flycatcher)
- Turdus olivaceus (olive thrush)
- Cercomela familiaris (familiar chat)
- Cercotrichas coryphaeus (Karoo scrub-robin)
- Oenanthe pileata (capped wheatear)

Nectariniidae

- Cinnyris chalybeus (southern double-collared sunbird)
- Nectarinia famosa (malachite sunbird)

Passeridae

- Passer melanurus (Cape sparrow)
- Passer domesticus (house sparrow)
- Passer diffusus (southern grey-headed sparrow)

Pelecanidae

- Pelecanus onocrotalus (great white pelican), (Wit pelikan) near threatened (NT)

Phalacrocoracidae

- Phalacrocorax africanus (reed cormorant)
- Phalacrocorax capensis (Cape cormorant) near threatened (NT)
- Phalacrocorax lucidus (white-breasted cormorant)
- Phalacrocorax coronatus (crowned cormorant) near threatened (NT)

Phasianidae

- Numida meleagris (helmeted guineafowl)
- Pternistis capensis (Cape spurfowl)
- Scleroptila africanus (grey-winged francolin)
- Coturnix coturnix (common quail)

Phoenicopteridae

- Phoenicopterus minor (lesser flamingo) near threatened (NT)
- Phoenicopterus ruber (greater flamingo) near threatened (NT)

Phylloscopidae

- Phylloscopus trochilus (willow warbler)

Ploceidae

- Euplectes capensis (yellow bishop)
- Euplectes orix (southern red bishop)
- Ploceus capensis (Cape weaver)
- Ploceus velatus (southern masked-weaver)

Podicipedidae

- Podiceps cristatus (great crested grebe)
- Podiceps nigricollis (black-necked grebe)
- Tachybaptus ruficollis (little grebe)

Pycnonotidae

- Pycnonotus capensis (Cape bulbul)

Rallidae

- Amaurornis flavirostris (black crake)
- Sarothrura rufa (red-chested flufftail)
- Porzana pusilla (Baillon's crake)
- Rallus caerulescens (African rail)

Recurvirostridae

- Himantopus himantopus (black-winged stilt)
- Recurvirostra avosetta (pied avocet)

Rostratulidae

- Rostratula benghalensis (greater painted-snipe) near threatened (NT)

Scolopacidae

- Gallinago nigripennis (African snipe), (Ethiopian snipe)
- Philomachus pugnax (ruff)
- Tringa nebularia (common greenshank)
- Tringa stagnatilis (marsh sandpiper)
- Actitis hypoleucos (common sandpiper)
- Arenaria interpres (ruddy turnstone)
- Calidris alba (sanderling)
- Calidris canutus (red knot)
- Calidris ferruginea (curlew sandpiper)
- Calidris melanotos (pectoral sandpiper)
- Calidris minuta (little stint)
- Limosa lapponica (bar-tailed godwit)
- Numenius arquata (Eurasian curlew)
- Numenius phaeopus (common whimbrel)
- Steganopus tricolor (Wilson's phalarope)
- Tringa glareola (wood sandpiper)
- Tringa totanus (common redshank)

Scopidae

- Scopus umbretta (hamerkop)

Strigidae

- Bubo africanus (spotted eagle-owl)
- Asio capensis (marsh owl)

Sturnidae

- Onychognathus morio (red-winged starling)
- Sturnus vulgaris (common starling), (European starling)
- Spreo bicolor (pied starling)

Sylviidae

- Sylvia subcoerulea (chestnut-vented warbler)

Threskiornithidae

- Bostrychia hagedash (hadeda ibis)
- Platalea alba (African spoonbill)
- Plegadis falcinellus (glossy ibis)
- Threskiornis aethiopicus (African sacred ibis)

Tytonidae

- Tyto alba (barn owl)

Upupidae

- Upupa africana (African hoopoe)

Viduidae

- Vidua macroura (pin-tailed whydah)

Zosteropidae

- Zosterops virens (Cape white-eye)

=== Plants ===
==== Indigenous ====
Aizoaceae

- Tetragonia fruticosa
- Galenia africana
- Tetragonia decumbens (sea spinach)
- Tetragonia spicata
- Acrosanthes humifusa
- Aizoon sarmentosum

Amaranthaceae

- Alternanthera sessilis
- Atriplex cinerea
- Atriplex semibaccata
- Salicornia meyeriana
- Salicornia perennis (syn. Sarcocornia perennis)
- Sarcocornia capensis
- Sarcocornia natalensis
- Sarcocornia pillansii
- Chenopodium murale
- Exomis microphylla

Amaryllidaceae

- Ammocharis longifolia
- Brunsvigia orientalis (candelabra flower)
- Haemanthus coccineus
- Haemanthus pubescens pubescens
- Haemanthus sanguineus

Anacardiaceae

- Rhus glauca (blou taaibos)
- Rhus crenata (blink taaibos), (turkeyberry)
- Rhus laevigata
- Rhus lancea
- Rhus lucida
- Rhus tomentosa
- Schinus molle
- Chlorophytum undulatum

Apiaceae

- Dasispermum suffruticosum
- Sonderina hispida
- Sonderina tenuis
- Capnophyllum africanum
- Stoibrax capense
- Torilis arvensis
- Lichtensteinia obscura

Apocynaceae

- Cynanchum africanum
- Carissa macrocarpa
- Microloma sagittatum
- Gomphocarpus physocarpus
- Eustegia filiformis

Aponogetonaceae

- Aponogeton angustifolius
- Aponogeton distachyos

Araceae

- Zantedeschia aethiopica

Asparagaceae

- Asparagus capensis
- Asparagus lignosus
- Asparagus rubicundus
- Asparagus asparagoides

Asphodelaceae

- Aloe sp.1
- Trachyandra filiformis
- Trachyandra ciliata
- Trachyandra divaricata
- Bulbine lagopus
- Trachyandra brachypoda
- Trachyandra muricata
- Trachyandra revoluta

Asteraceae

- Athanasia crithmifolia
- Chrysanthemoides incana
- Dimorphotheca pluvialis
- Senecio burchellii
- Amellus asteroides
- Amellus tenuifolius
- Arctotheca calendula
- Arctotheca populifolia
- Arctotis hirsuta
- Arctotis stoechadifolia
- Athanasia dentata
- Athanasia trifurcata
- Berkheya rigida
- Chrysanthemoides monilifera (bitoubos)
- Cineraria geifolia
- Cotula coronopifolia
- Cotula eckloniana
- Cotula filifolia
- Cotula turbinata
- Dicerothamnus rhinocerotis
- Didelta carnosa
- Eriocephalus africanus
- Eriocephalus racemosus
- Felicia tenella
- Helichrysum niveum
- Helichrysum patulum
- Helichrysum revolutum
- Leysera gnaphalodes
- Metalasia muricata
- Nidorella foetida
- Oncosiphon suffruticosum
- Osteospermum junceum
- Othonna coronopifolia
- Plecostachys serpyllifolia
- Senecio elegans
- Senecio halimifolius (tabakbos)
- Senecio littoreus
- Senecio rosmarinifolius
- Seriphium plumosum
- Steirodiscus tagetes
- Xanthium strumarium
- Helichrysum cymosum
- Hypochaeris radicata
- Lactuca serriola
- Sonchus oleraceus
- Cotula vulgaris
- Dimorphotheca sinuata
- Helichrysum helianthemifolium
- Othonna filicaulis
- Petalacte coronata
- Senecio arenarius
- Senecio hastatus
- Senecio pubigerus
- Stoebe capitata
- Trichogyne repens

Brassicaceae

- Heliophila africana
- Raphanus raphanistrum (wild mustard)

Campanulaceae

- Wahlenbergia capensis
- Wahlenbergia androsacea

Caryophyllaceae

- Silene pilosellifolia
- Spergularia media

Celastraceae

- Pterocelastrus tricuspidatus
- Putterlickia pyracantha
- Gymnosporia heterophylla

Ceratophyllaceae

- Ceratophyllum demersum

Colchicaceae

- Androcymbium eucomoides
- Ornithoglossum viride
- Androcymbium capense

Convolvulaceae

- Cuscuta nitida
- Falkia repens
- Ipomoea purpurea

Crassulaceae

- Cotyledon orbiculata
- Tylecodon grandiflorus
- Crassula cymosa
- Crassula dichotoma
- Crassula glomerata
- Crassula vaillantii
- Crassula fallax
- Crassula flava

Cucurbitaceae

- Kedrostis nana

Cyperaceae

- Bolboschoenus maritimus
- Schoenoplectus scirpoides
- Carex sp.1
- Cyperus textilis
- Ficinia indica
- Ficinia nigrescens
- Ficinia nodosa
- Hellmuthia membranacea

Ebenaceae

- Euclea racemosa
- Euclea undulata

Ericaceae

- Erica subdivaricata

Euphorbiaceae

- Euphorbia burmanni
- Euphorbia caput-medusae
- Euphorbia mauritanica
- Euphorbia peplus
- Euphorbia helioscopia
- Euphorbia sp.1

Fabaceae

- Aspalathus hispida
- Dipogon lignosus
- Indigofera complicata
- Lessertia rigida
- Lessertia sp.1
- Psoralea repens
- Rhynchosia ferulifolia
- Senna didymobotrya
- Medicago polymorpha
- Otholobium hirtum
- Spartium junceum
- Sutherlandia frutescens
- Aspalathus acanthophylla
- Aspalathus cymbiformis
- Aspalathus ternata
- Otholobium virgatum

Frankeniaceae

- Frankenia pulverulenta

Fumariaceae

- Cysticapnos vesicaria
- Fumaria muralis

Gentianaceae

- Orphium frutescens
- Sebaea aurea
- Sebaea albens

Geraniaceae

- Pelargonium gibbosum
- Erodium moschatum
- Geranium incanum
- Pelargonium capitatum
- Pelargonium cucullatum
- Pelargonium senecioides
- Geranium molle
- Pelargonium hirtum
- Pelargonium myrrhifolium
- Pelargonium triste

Haemodoraceae

- Wachendorfia paniculata

Hyacinthaceae

- Albuca maxima
- Ornithogalum flaccida (albuca flaccida)
- Lachenalia pallida
- Ornithogalum hispidum
- Ornithogalum thyrsoides
- Albuca fragrans
- Drimia filifolia
- Lachenalia contaminata
- Lachenalia reflexa

Hypoxidaceae

- Spiloxene aquatica
- Spiloxene capensis

Iridaceae

- Babiana ambigua
- Babiana ringens
- Babiana tubulosa
- Chasmanthe aethiopica (suurkanol)
- Ferraria crispa
- Ferraria crispa
- Ferraria divaricata
- Gladiolus cunonius
- Gladiolus griseus
- Gladiolus undulatus
- Lapeirousia anceps
- Melasphaerula ramosa
- Micranthus junceus
- Moraea flaccida
- Moraea fugax
- Moraea miniata
- Moraea setifolia
- Romulea flava
- Romulea obscura
- Romulea tabularis
- Sparaxis bulbifera
- Gladiolus carinatus (blou Afrikaner)
- Aristea africana
- Geissorhiza aspera
- Geissorhiza tenella
- Ixia paniculata
- Moraea gawleri
- Romulea hirsuta
- Romulea schlechteri
- Watsonia meriana

Juncaceae

- Juncus kraussii
- Juncus kraussii

Juncaginaceae

- Triglochin bulbosa

Lamiaceae

- Salvia lanceolata
- Salvia aurea (syn. S. africana-lutea)

Lauraceae

- Cassytha ciliolata

Lemnaceae

- Lemna gibba
- Lemna minor

Lobeliaceae

- Lobelia sp.1
- Monopsis lutea
- Monopsis simplex

Malvaceae

- Hermannia multiflora
- Hermannia pinnata
- Hermannia procumbens
- Malva parviflora
- Hermannia linifolia
- Hermannia procumbens procumbens

Melianthaceae

- Melianthus major

Menispermaceae

- Cissampelos capensis

Mesembryanthemaceae

- Carpobrotus edulis
- Ruschia macowanii
- Ruschia serrulata
- Ruschia tumidula
- Carpobrotus acinaciformis
- Conicosia pugioniformis
- Drosanthemum floribundum
- Lampranthus aureus
- Lampranthus multiradiatus
- Lampranthus sociorum
- Mesembryanthemum crystallinum
- Disphyma crassifolium
- Carpanthea pomeridiana
- Lampranthus amoenus
- Lampranthus calcaratus
- Lampranthus explanatus
- Lampranthus glaucus
- Lampranthus reptans
- Lampranthus stenus
- Phyllobolus canaliculatus
- Ruschia geminiflora

Molluginaceae

- Pharnaceum lineare

Myoporaceae

- Myoporum tetrandrum

Myricaceae

- Morella cordifolia
- Morella quercifolia

Neuradaceae

- Grielum grandiflorum

Oleaceae

- Olea capensis
- Olea europaea africana

Onagraceae

- Ludwigia adscendens diffusa

Orchidaceae

- Corycium crispum
- Corycium orobanchoides
- Satyrium odorum
- Satyrium bicorne
- Acrolophia bolusii
- Disa bracteata
- Holothrix villosa
- Pterygodium catholicum
- Satyrium coriifolium

Orobanchaceae

- Harveya squamosa

Oxalidaceae

- Oxalis compressa
- Oxalis hirta
- Oxalis luteola
- Oxalis obtusa
- Oxalis pes-caprae
- Oxalis purpurea
- Oxalis pusilla

Plantaginaceae

- Plantago coronopus
- Plantago crassifolia
- Plantago lanceolata
- Plantago crassifolia

Plumbaginaceae

- Limonium equisetinum
- Limonium scabrum

Poaceae

- Ehrharta villosa
- Ammophila arenaria
- Cladoraphis cyperoides
- Cynodon dactylon (couch grass; kweekgras; kweek)
- Cynosurus echinatus
- Ehrharta calycina
- Ehrharta longiflora
- Lolium multiflorum (Italian ryegrass; annual ryegrass)
- Lolium rigidum
- Pennisetum macrourum
- Phragmites australis
- Sporobolus virginicus
- Stenotaphrum secundatum (buffalo grass)
- Thinopyrum distichum
- Bromus diandrus (ripgut brome; predikantsluis)
- Paspalum distichum

Polygalaceae

- Nylandtia spinosa (skilpadbessie bos), (tortoise berry bush)
- Polygala myrtifolia
- Muraltia satureioides

Polygonaceae

- Persicaria decipiens
- Persicaria lapathifolia
- Rumex crispus
- Rumex lativalvis
- Rumex sagittatus

Potamogetonaceae

- Potamogeton pectinatus

Proteaceae

- Leucadendron levisanus (Cape flats conebush)

Ranunculaceae

- Ranunculus rionii

Restionaceae

- Thamnochortus sp.1
- Willdenowia incurvata
- Elegia tectorum
- Ischyrolepis eleocharis
- Thamnochortus spicigerus
- Calopsis rigorata
- Elegia verreauxii
- Thamnochortus erectus

Rhamnaceae

- Phylica ericoides
- Phylica cephalantha
- Phylica parviflora

Rosaceae

- Cliffortia falcata
- Cliffortia stricta
- Cliffortia ericifolia
- Cliffortia hirta

Rubiaceae

- Anthospermum spathulatum
- Galium tomentosum

Ruppiaceae

- Ruppia maritima

Rutaceae

- Diosma aspalathoides

Sapotaceae

- Sideroxylon inerme

Scrophulariaceae

- Diascia capensis
- Hebenstretia cordata
- Hebenstretia repens
- Hemimeris racemosa
- Lyperia lychnidea
- Lyperia tristis
- Manulea tomentosa
- Nemesia versicolor
- Phyllopodium cephalophorum
- Hemimeris sabulosa
- Nemesia affinis
- Zaluzianskya villosa
- Dischisma capitatum
- Hebenstretia dentata
- Manulea rubra
- Nemesia ligulata

Solanaceae

- Solanum guineense
- Datura ferox
- Lycium afrum
- Lycium ferocissimum
- Lycium horridum
- Solanum americanum
- Solanum linnaeanum

Sterculiaceae

- Hermannia procumbens

Tecophilaeaceae

- Cyanella hyacinthoides

Thymelaeaceae

- Passerina corymbosa
- Passerina ericoides
- Passerina rigida
- Gnidia spicata
- Lachnaea grandiflora
- Struthiola striata

Typhaceae

- Typha capensis (bulrush), (papkuil)

Viscaceae

- Viscum capense

Zygophyllaceae

- Zygophyllum flexuosum
- Zygophyllum morgsana
- Zygophyllum sessilifolium

==== Introduced ====
Agavaceae

- Agave sisalana (sisal)

Anacardiaceae

- Schinus terebinthifolius (Brazilian pepper)

Araceae

- Pistia stratiotes (water lettuce)

Asteraceae

- Senecio pterophorus

Azollaceae

- Azolla filiculoides (red water fern)

Boraginaceae

- Echium plantagineum

Cactaceae

- Opuntia ficus-indica

Commelinaceae

- Commelina benghalensis (Blouselblommetjie), (Benghal dayflower)

Fabaceae

- Acacia cyclops (Rooikrans)
- Acacia saligna (Port Jackson)
- Paraserianthes lophantha
- Sesbania punicea
- Vicia benghalensis
- Vicia sativa

Haloragaceae

- Myriophyllum aquaticum

Lythraceae

- Lythrum salicaria

Malvaceae

- Lavatera arborea

Moraceae

- Ficus natalensis

Myoporaceae

- Myoporum tenuifolium (manatoka)

Myrtaceae

- Eucalyptus grandis
- Eucalyptus lehmannii
- Eucalyptus gomphocephala

Poaceae

- Arundo donax
- Avena fatua (common wild oat)
- Avena sativa
- Avena sp.1
- Cortaderia selloana (pampas grass)
- Lolium perenne
- Paspalum vaginatum
- Pennisetum clandestinum (Kikuyu grass)
- Pennisetum setaceum

Pontederiaceae

- Eichhornia crassipes (water hyacinth)
