= Rietvlei Wetland Reserve =

Nature reserve in Table View, Western Cape, South Africa

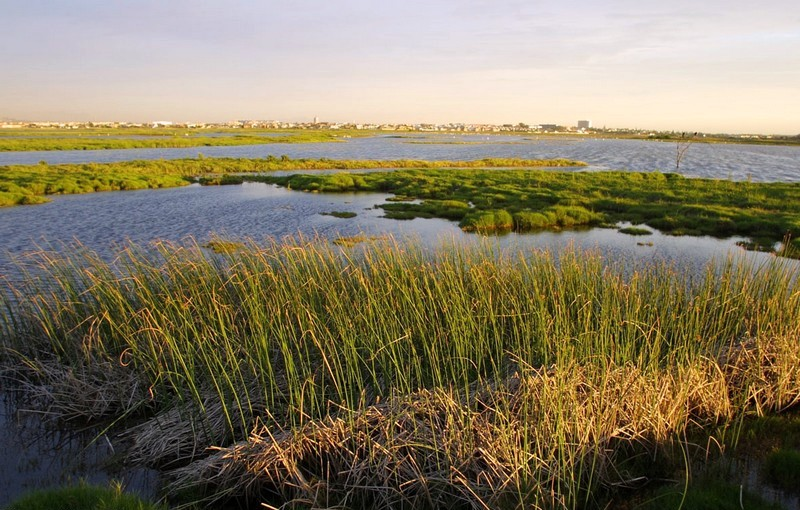

- Location within Cape Town Location within Western Cape
- Location: Table View, Western Cape, South Africa
- Coordinates: 33°50′45″S 18°30′01″E
- Area: 663 ha (1,640 acres)
- Established: 1984
- Governing body: City of Cape Town

The Rietvlei Wetland Reserve is a 663-hectare (1,640-acre) nature reserve situated in Table View, Western Cape, South Africa. It is managed by the City of Cape Town's Environmental Resource Management Department.

The Rietvlei Wetland Reserve forms part of the greater 880 hectares (2,200 acres) Table Bay Nature Reserve.

== Background ==
Rietvlei is considered as the most important area for waterbirds in the region and is recognized as an Important Bird Area by BirdLife International. Official recognition of its importance to biodiversity by the South African government was first afforded in 1984, when it was established as a Nature Area. This was followed by its declaration as a Protected Natural Environment in 1989, and the establishment of the Rietvlei Wetland Reserve in 1993. The first formal management plan for the reserve was developed in 1994, and this has served to guide management activities to the present.

== History ==
The most obvious and dramatic human-induced modification at Rietvlei was the dredging of the entire north-west section between 1974 and 1976. Seawater was pumped into the pans to facilitate the operation and a vast area was dredged to a depth of 9 metres (30 ft). The ecological consequences were profound and irreversible. A sizable portion of Rietvlei's shallow ephemeral pans was changed into a permanent deep-water lake, which resulted in a total change in ecological character for this portion of the system.

== Features ==
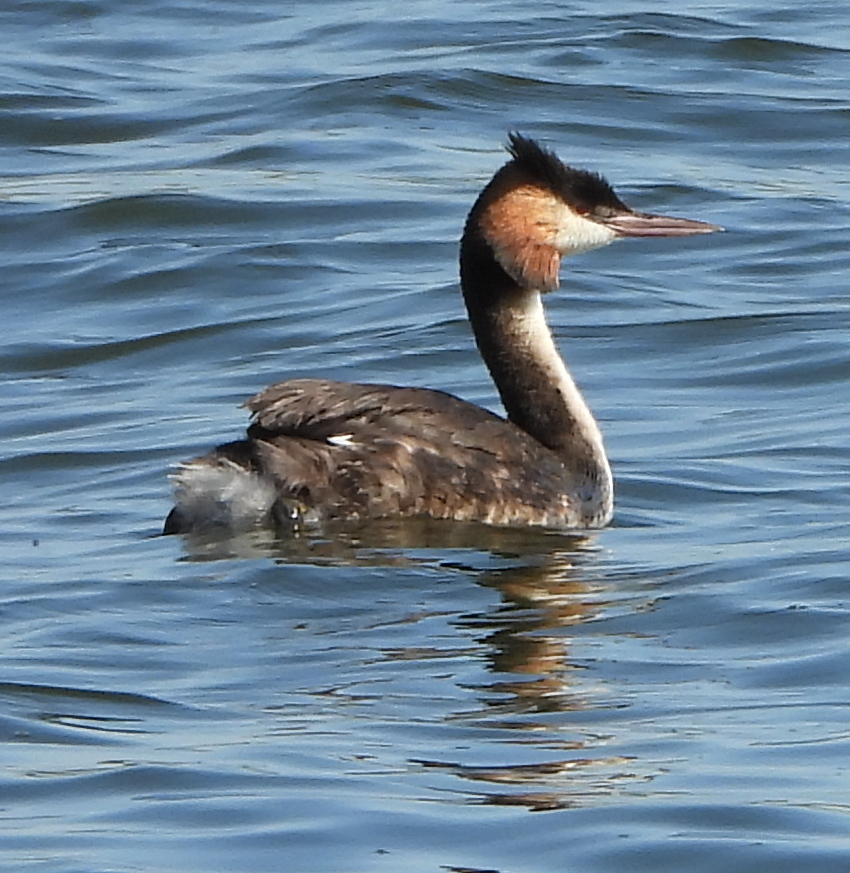
Great crested grebe (P. cristatus infuscatus) at Rietvlei

=== Visitor facilities ===
Rietvlei Wetland Reserve offers various user activities, including several types of water sport recreation, bird watching, picnic, fishing and outdoor environmental education opportunities. The Rietvlei Education Centre hosts a range of environmental education programmes and utilises the two bird hides and the short footpath for field excursions.

The Milnerton Aquatic Club leases an area of land inside the nature reserve from where they promote windsurf, sail, power- and radio-controlled boating. The Southern African Foundation for the Conservation of Coastal Birds (SANCCOB) manages a rehabilitation facility at Rietvlei.

=== Habitats ===
A range of natural and semi-natural habitats exist in this fluctuating wetland, which floods in winter and dries out in summer when the estuary mouth closes. These habitats include shallow marine waters, estuarine waters, sand/shingle shores, tidal mudflats, saltmarshes, coastal brackish saline lagoons, rivers, streams and creeks, permanent freshwater lakes and permanent and seasonal freshwater marshes and pools.

=== The Diep estuary ===
The Diep River flows through the Rietvlei wetland and the Milnerton Lagoon, which together have generally been considered to comprise the Diep estuary. If the 5 metres (16 ft) contour above mean sea level is used as the estuary delineation, then the Diep estuary entirely encompasses the Rietvlei Wetland Reserve. The Diep River has its origins in the Riebeek Kasteel Mountains north-east of Malmesbury from where it flows for about 65 kilometres (40 mi) south-west towards Cape Town before entering the sea at Milnerton, some 5 kilometres (3.1 mi) north of the Port of Cape Town. It has one major tributary, the Mosselbank, which drains the northern slopes of the Durbanville Hills. Other tributaries include the Swart, Groen, Klein, and Riebeeck, with the Klapmuts being a tributary of the Mosselbank. The total size of the catchment is 1,495 km^{2} or 154,347 hectares.

== Biodiversity ==
=== Birds, amphibians, reptiles and mammals ===
A total of 173 species have been recorded at Rietvlei, of which 102 are waterbirds and 76 are present regularly. Breeding has been confirmed for 23 waterbird species and is suspected for a further 13 species. The high diversity of waterbirds is due to the wide range of wetland habitats present and the proximity of Rietvlei to the ocean, which allows both freshwater and coastal species to exploit the system. Fluctuating water-levels are intrinsic to Rietvlei's biological value. During peak floods, swimming birds of deep, open water abound. Birds of marshy habitats replace these as the water recedes, and waders exploiting shallow mudflats occur in great abundance just prior to the wetland drying up. Rietvlei has been ranked as the sixth most important coastal wetland in South Africa for waterbirds, and it supports an average of 5,550 birds in summer; during good years, however, numbers are boosted above 15,000. Phoenicopterus minor, a species of global conservation concern, occurs at the site, but not in globally significant numbers.

List of birds in the reserve

Updated from South African Biodiversity Database (http://www.biodiversity.co.za/) as species present on site on 2011/01/10 (surveys incomplete)
Indigenous - rare and endangered

1. Anthropoides paradiseus (blue crane) (Vulnerable) (VU)
2. Circus ranivorus (African marsh-harrier) (Vulnerable) (VU)

Indigenous

1. Acrocephalus gracilirostris (lesser swamp-warbler)
2. Actitis hypoleucos (common sandpiper)
3. Alcedo cristata (malachite kingfisher)
4. Alopochen aegyptiacus (Egyptian goose)
5. Anas capensis (Cape teal)
6. Anas erythrorhyncha (red-billed teal)
7. Anas smithii (Cape shoveler)
8. Anas sparsa (African black duck)
9. Anas undulata (yellow-billed duck)
10. Anhinga rufa (African darter)
11. Apus affinis (little swift)
12. Ardea cinerea (grey heron)
13. Ardea goliath (Goliath heron)
14. Ardea melanocephala (black-headed heron)
15. Ardea purpurea (purple heron)
16. Bostrychia hagedash (hadeda ibis)
17. Bradypterus baboecala (little rush-warbler)
18. Bubulcus ibis (cattle egret)
19. Burhinus vermiculatus (water thick-knee, water dikkop)
20. Calidris alba (sanderling)
21. Calidris canutus (red knot)
22. Calidris ferruginea (curlew sandpiper)
23. Calidris melanotos (pectoral sandpiper)
24. Calidris minuta (little stint)
25. Cercotrichas coryphoeus (Karoo scrub-robin)
26. Ceryle rudis (pied kingfisher)
27. Charadrius hiaticula (common ringed plover)
28. Charadrius marginatus (white-fronted plover)
29. Charadrius pallidus (chestnut-banded plover)
30. Charadrius pecuarius (Kittlitz's plover)
31. Charadrius tricollaris (three-banded plover)
32. Chlidonias leucopterus (white-winged tern)
33. Columba guinea (speckled pigeon)
34. Corvus albus (pied crow)
35. Egretta alba (great egret)
36. Egretta garzetta (little egret)
37. Egretta intermedia (yellow-billed egret)
38. Elanus caeruleus (black-winged kite)
39. Estrilda astrild (common waxbill)
40. Euplectes orix (southern red bishop)
41. Falco rupicolus (rock kestrel)
42. Fulica cristata (red-knobbed coot)
43. Gallinago nigripennis (African snipe, Ethiopian snipe)
44. Gallinula chloropus (common moorhen)
45. Haematopus moquini (African black oystercatcher)
46. Haliaeetus vocifer (African fish-eagle)
47. Himantopus himantopus (black-winged stilt)
48. Hirundo albigularis (white-throated swallow)
49. Hirundo rustica (barn swallow)
50. Larus cirrocephalus (grey-headed gull)
51. Larus dominicanus (kelp gull)
52. Larus hartlaubii (Hartlaub's gull)
53. Limosa lapponica (bar-tailed godwit)
54. Macronyx capensis (Cape longclaw)
55. Megaceryle maximus (giant kingfisher)
56. Merops apiaster (European bee-eater)
57. Microcarbo africanus (reed cormorant)
58. Microcarbo coronatus (crowned cormorant)
59. Milvus migrans (black kite, yellow-billed kite)
60. Motacilla capensis (Cape wagtail)
61. Netta erythrophthalma (southern pochard)
62. Numenius arquata (Eurasian curlew)
63. Numenius phaeopus (common whimbrel)
64. Nycticorax nycticorax (black-crowned night-heron)
65. Oxyura maccoa (Maccoa duck)
66. Pelecanus onocrotalus (great white pelican)
67. Phalacrocorax capensis (Cape cormorant)
68. Phalacrocorax lucidus (white-breasted cormorant)
69. Philomachus pugnax (ruff)
70. Phoenicopterus minor (lesser flamingo)
71. Phoenicopterus ruber (greater flamingo)
72. Platalea alba (African spoonbill)
73. Plectropterus gambensis (spur-winged goose)
74. Plegadis falcinellus (glossy ibis)
75. Podiceps cristatus (great crested grebe)
76. Podiceps nigricollis (black-necked grebe)
77. Porphyrio madagascariensis (African purple swamphen)
78. Pternistis capensis (Cape spurfowl)
79. Recurvirostra avosetta (pied avocet)
80. Rostratula benghalensis (greater painted-snipe)
81. Spatula hottentota (blue-billed teal)
82. Spilopelia senegalensis (laughing dove)
83. Sterna balaenarum (Damara tern)
84. Sterna bergii (swift tern)
85. Sterna caspia (Caspian tern)
86. Sterna hirundo (common tern)
87. Sterna sandvicensis (sandwich tern)
88. Sterna vittata (Antarctic tern)
89. Tachybaptus ruficollis (little grebe)
90. Tadorna cana (South African shelduck)
91. Thalassornis leuconotus (white-backed duck)
92. Threskiornis aethiopicus (African sacred ibis)
93. Tringa glareola (wood sandpiper)
94. Tringa nebularia (common greenshank)
95. Tringa stagnatilis (marsh sandpiper)
96. Vanellus armatus (blacksmith lapwing, blacksmith plover)
97. Vidua macroura (pin-tailed whydah)

Alien

1. Anas platyrhynchos (mallard)
2. Columba livia (feral pigeon, rock dove)
3. Numida meleagris (helmeted guineafowl)
List of amphibians in the reserve

Updated from South African Biodiversity Database (http://www.biodiversity.co.za/) as species present on site on 2011/01/07

1. Amietia fuscigula (Cape river frog)
2. Amietophrynus pantherinus (western leopard toad)
3. Strongylopus grayii (clicking stream frog)
4. Strongylopus grayii grayii (clicking stream frog)
5. Tomopterna delalandii (Cape sand frog)
6. Xenopus laevis (common platanna)
List of reptiles in the reserve

Updated from South African Biodiversity Database (http://www.biodiversity.co.za/) as species present on site on 2011/01/13

1. Acontias meleagris (Cape legless skink)
2. Afrogecko porphyreus (marbled leaf-toed gecko)
3. Bradypodion pumilum (Cape dwarf chameleon)
4. Chersina angulata (angulate tortoise)
5. Lycodonomorphus rufulus (common brown water snake)
6. Meroles knoxii (Knox's desert lizard)
7. Naja nivea (Cape cobra)
8. Pelomedusa subrufa (marsh terrapin)
9. Pseudaspis cana (mole snake)
10. Scelotes bipes (silvery dwarf burrowing skink)
11. Trachylepis capensis (Cape skink)
12. Trachylepis homalocephala (red-sided skink)
13. Typhlosaurus caecus (Cuvier's blind legless skink)
List of mammals in the reserve

Updated from South African Biodiversity Database (http://www.biodiversity.co.za/) as species present on site on 2011/01/10
Indigenous

1. Aonyx capensis (Cape clawless otter)
2. Felis caracal (caracal)
3. Galerella pulverulenta (small grey mongoose)
4. Herpestes ichneumon (large grey mongoose)
5. Hystrix africaeaustralis (porcupine)
6. Mus minutoides (African pygmy mouse)
7. Myosorex varius (forest shrew)
8. Raphicerus campestris (steenbok)
9. Raphicerus melanotis (Cape grysbok)

Alien

1. Canis lupus familiaris (domestic dog)
2. Felis silvestris catus (domestic cat)

=== Invertebrates and fish ===
Zooplankton multiply rapidly after winter flooding and disappear in summer as the water dries up. In the estuary there is a range of salinities, resulting in a diverse community of zooplankton. The invertebrate fauna is a vital food source for birds and fish, the most abundant fish in the wetland being Liza richardsonii.

List of fish in the reserve

Updated from South African Biodiversity Database (http://www.biodiversity.co.za/) as species present on site on 2010/12/31
Indigenous

1. Anguilla mossambica steinitzi (longfin eel)
2. Caffrogobius nudiceps (barehead goby)
3. Galaxias zebratus (Cape galaxia)
4. Lithognathus lithognathus (white steenbras)
5. Liza richardsonii (southern mullet)
6. Mugil cephalus (flathead mullet)
7. Rhabdosargus globiceps (white stumpnose)

Alien

1. Cyprinus carpio (carp)
2. Gambusia affinis (mosquito fish)

=== Plant communities ===
Five distinctive wetland plant communities occur: perennial wetland, reed-marsh, sedge-marsh, open pans and sedge pans. The perennial wetland is characterized by scant aquatic vegetation, dominated by Ruppia, Potamogeton and Enteromorpha. The reed-marsh is dominated by Phragmites, invaded in places by Typha. The sedge-marsh is dominated by Bolboschoenus and Juncus. The open pans are sparsely covered in macrophytes, consisting mainly of Limosella and Salicornia, and the sedge pans are dominated by Bolboschoenus in summer and Aponogeton and Pauridia in winter.

Provisional list of plants in the reserve

Updated from South African Biodiversity Database (http://www.biodiversity.co.za/) as species present on site on 2011/02/02
Indigenous

1. Alternanthera sessilis
2. Amellus tenuifolius
3. Ammophila arenaria
4. Arctotheca populifolia
5. Arctotis hirsuta
6. Arctotis stoechadifolia
7. Athanasia dentata
8. Atriplex semibaccata~
9. Bolboschoenus maritimus
10. Brunsvigia orientalis (candelabra flower)
11. Carissa macrocarpa
12. Carpobrotus acinaciformis
13. Carpobrotus edulis
14. Ceratophyllum demersum~
15. Chasmanthe aethiopica (suurkanol)
16. Chrysanthemoides incana
17. Chrysanthemoides monilifera (bitoubos)
18. Cladoraphis cyperoides
19. Conicosia pugioniformis~
20. Cynanchum africanum
21. Cynodon dactylon (couch grass, kweekgras, kweek)
22. Cynosurus echinatus
23. Cyperus textilis
24. Dasispermum suffruticosum
25. Didelta carnosa~
26. Ehrharta longiflora
27. Ehrharta villosa~
28. Euclea racemosa
29. Ferraria crispa
30. Ficinia indica
31. Ficus natalensis~
32. Gladiolus griseus
33. Grielum grandiflorum
34. Helichrysum niveum
35. Helichrysum patulum
36. Hermannia pinnata
37. Hermannia procumbens~
38. Indigofera complicata
39. Ischyrolepis eleocharis
40. Juncus kraussii~
41. Kedrostis nana~
42. Lavatera arborea
43. Lemna minor
44. Limonium equisetinum
45. Limonium scabrum~
46. Lolium multiflorum (Italian ryegrass, annual ryegrass)
47. Lolium rigidum
48. Ludwigia adscendens diffusa
49. Lycium ferocissimum
50. Lythrum salicaria
51. Malva parviflora~
52. Metalasia muricata
53. Moraea flaccida
54. Moraea miniata
55. Morella cordifolia
56. Myoporum tenuifolium (manatoka)
57. Nylandtia spinosa (skilpadbessie bos, tortoise berry bush)
58. Olea capensis
59. Olea europaea africana
60. Othonna coronopifolia
61. Passerina ericoides
62. Pelargonium gibbosum
63. Persicaria lapathifolia
64. Phragmites australis
65. Phylica ericoides~
66. Pistia stratiotes
67. Plantago coronopus
68. Plecostachys serpyllifolia
69. Psoralea repens
70. Rhus crenata (blink taaibos, turkeyberry)
71. Rhus glauca (blou taaibos)
72. Rhus laevigata
73. Rhus lancea
74. Rhus lucida~
75. Romulea tabularis
76. Rumex crispus
77. Rumex lativalvis
78. Ruschia macowanii
79. Ruschia tumidula
80. Salicornia meyeriana
81. Salvia aurea (syn. S. africana-lutea)
82. Sarcocornia capensis
83. Sarcocornia natalensis~
84. Sarcocornia pillansii~
85. Schoenoplectus scirpoides
86. Senecio burchellii
87. Senecio halimifolius (tabakbos)
88. Sideroxylon inerme~
89. Sparaxis bulbifera
90. Sporobolus virginicus
91. Stenotaphrum secundatum (buffalo grass)
92. Tetragonia decumbens
93. Tetragonia fruticosa
94. Tetragonia spicata
95. Thamnochortus spicigerus
96. Thinopyrum distichum
97. Trachyandra filiformis
98. Triglochin bulbosa
99. Typha capensis (bulrush, papkuil)
100. Xanthium strumarium
101. Zantedeschia aethiopica
102. Zygophyllum morgsana

Alien

1. Acacia cyclops (rooikrans)
2. Acacia saligna (Port Jackson willow)
3. Avena sativa
4. Azolla filiculoides (red water fern)
5. Commelina benghalensis (blouselblommetjie)
6. Cortaderia selloana (pampas grass)
7. Eichhornia crassipes (water hyacinth)
8. Eucalyptus lehmannii
9. Lolium perenne
10. Paspalum vaginatum
11. Pennisetum clandestinum (kikuyu grass)
12. Schinus terebinthifolius

== Threats ==
The effects of the nearby Century City Development on Blouvlei, which used to support a large heronry holding 12 breeding species, is cause for considerable concern. Most of these birds used to forage at Rietvlei and would contribute substantially to the large numbers of birds occurring here. The effects on this breeding area will probably result in fewer birds visiting the Rietvlei area. Other threats to the wetland include siltation, which results from erosion, and pollution and eutrophication from fertilizers, pesticides, sewage works, stormwater run-off and livestock manure. Petroleum factories and suburban areas on the margin of the system also pose problems. Vast areas of the mudflats and salt marsh have been smothered by thick mats of non-native grasses, notably Paspalum vaginatum, resulting in habitat loss for waders, the most diverse and abundant community of waterbirds at Rietvlei. Other non-native species, including stands of Acacia saligna, are being cleared from large areas around the margin of the wetland.

== See also ==
- Biodiversity of Cape Town
- Diep River Fynbos Corridor
- Milnerton Racecourse Nature Reserve
- List of nature reserves in Cape Town
- Cape Lowland Freshwater Wetland
