= Diep River Fynbos Corridor =

Nature reserve in South Africa

- Parklands Fynbos Corridor
- Location within Cape Town Location within Western Cape
- Location: Milnerton Rural, Western Cape, South Africa
- Coordinates: 33.81389°S 18.52287°E
- Governing body: City of Cape Town
- Website: www.capetown.gov.za/en/environmentalresourcemanagement/Pages/default.aspx

The Diep River Fynbos Corridor is a nature reserve located in the Blaauwberg region of Cape Town, South Africa. It forms part of the larger Table Bay Nature Reserve, which was established in June 2012.

== Location and ownership ==
The Fynbos Corridor is jointly owned by the City of Cape Town and a private owner. The Diep River runs south into the Rietvlei Wetland Reserve, and the corridor extends north-west towards the Blaauwberg Conservation Area (BCA). The corridor runs through the Parklands and Sunningdale developments that are managed by ASKA and SEEFF Properties, respectively.

== Vision ==
The Fynbos Corridor extends from the Diep River in the South to the BCA in the north. Approximately seven kilometers in length, it is interrupted by five east–west routes and two south–north routes. The total extent of the corridor, including the satellite areas to the east and west, takes up large portions of privately owned land including the Garden Cities and the Milnerton Estates. It is the intention of the owners of these properties to cede the necessary land portions to the local authorities as development proceeds. The City of Cape Town owns the Potsdam Outspan land immediately adjacent to the Diep River, which is the planned origin of the corridor, as well as the BCA where the corridor will end.

== Biodiversity ==
A provisional list of species recorded in the reserve, as of 2011, includes the following:

Mammals

- Otomys unisulcatus (bush Karoo rat)
- Vulpes chama (Cape fox)
- Tatera afra (Cape gerbil)
- Raphicerus melanotis (Cape grysbok)
- Lepus capensis (Cape hare)
- Georychus capensis (Cape mole-rat)
- Eptesicus capensis (Cape serotine bat)
- Sylvicapra grimmia (common duiker)
- Cryptomys hottentotus (common mole-rat)
- Felis silvestris catus (domestic cat)
- Myosorex varius (forest shrew)
- Dendromus melanotis (grey climbing mouse)
- Mus musculus (house mouse)
- Genetta tigrina (large-spotted genet)
- Hystrix africaeaustralis (porcupine)
- Lepus saxatilis (scrub hare)
- Galerella pulverulenta (small grey mongoose)
- Genetta genetta (small-spotted genet)
- Raphicerus campestris (steenbok)
- Rhabdomys pumilio (four-striped grass mouse)
- Otomys irroratus (vlei rat)
- Cynictis penicillata (yellow mongoose)
- Rattus rattus (black rat)

Birds

- Alopochen aegyptiacus (Egyptian goose)
- Anas capensis (Cape teal)
- Anas erythrorhyncha (red-billed teal)
- Anas platyrhynchos (mallard)
- Anas smithii (Cape shoveler)
- Anas sparsa (African black duck)
- Anas undulata (yellow-billed duck)
- Anhinga rufa (African darter)
- Anthropoides paradiseus (blue crane)
- Ardea cinerea (grey heron)
- Ardea melanocephala (black-headed heron)
- Ardea purpurea (purple heron)
- Bostrychia hagedash (hadeda ibis)
- Bubo africanus (spotted eagle-owl)
- Bubulcus ibis (cattle egret)
- Burhinus vermiculatus (water thick-knee, water dikkop)
- Ceryle rudis (pied kingfisher)
- Charadrius tricollaris (three-banded plover)
- Ciconia ciconia (white stork)
- Corvus albus (pied crow)
- Egretta alba (great egret)
- Egretta garzetta (little egret)
- Egretta intermedia (yellow-billed egret)
- Elanus caeruleus (black-winged kite)
- Fulica cristata (red-knobbed coot)
- Gallinula chloropus (common moorhen)
- Haliaeetus vocifer (African fish-eagle)
- Himantopus himantopus (black-winged stilt)
- Larus dominicanus (kelp gull)
- Larus hartlaubii (Hartlaub's gull)
- Milvus migrans (black kite, yellow-billed kite)
- Motacilla capensis (Cape wagtail)
- Nycticorax nycticorax (black-crowned night-heron)
- Oena capensis (Namaqua dove)
- Pelecanus onocrotalus (great white pelican)
- Phalacrocorax africanus (reed cormorant)
- Phalacrocorax capensis (Cape cormorant)
- Phalacrocorax lucidus (white-breasted cormorant)
- Platalea alba (African spoonbill)
- Plectropterus gambensis (spur-winged goose)
- Plegadis falcinellus (glossy ibis)
- Podiceps cristatus (great crested grebe)
- Podiceps nigricollis (black-necked grebe)
- Porphyrio madagascariensis (African purple swamphen)
- Prinia maculosa (Karoo prinia)
- Tachybaptus ruficollis (little grebe)
- Thalassornis leuconotus (white-backed duck)
- Threskiornis aethiopicus (African sacred ibis)
- Vanellus armatus (blacksmith lapwing, blacksmith plover)

Reptiles

- Naja nivea (Cape cobra)
- Trachylepis capensis (Cape skink)

Amphibians

- Amietia fuscigula (Cape river frog)

Introduced species

- Corvus splendens (Indian house crow)

== See also ==
- Table Bay Nature Reserve
- Cape Town
- City of Cape Town
- Rietvlei Wetland Reserve
- Biodiversity of Cape Town
- List of nature reserves in Cape Town
- Cape Flats Sand Fynbos
- Cape Flats Dune Strandveld
- Cape Lowland Freshwater Wetland
