= Amphibia in the 10th edition of Systema Naturae =

In the 10th edition of Systema Naturae, Carl Linnaeus described the Amphibia as:

Animals that are distinguished by a body cold and generally naked; stern and expressive countenance; harsh voice; mostly lurid color; filthy odor; a few are furnished with a horrid poison; all have cartilaginous bones, slow circulation, exquisite sight and hearing, large pulmonary vessels, lobate liver, oblong thick stomach, and cystic, hepatic, and pancreatic ducts: they are deficient in diaphragm, do not transpire (sweat), can live a long time without food, are tenatious of life, and have the power of reproducing parts which have been destroyed or lost; some undergo a metamorphosis; some cast (shed) their skin; some appear to live promiscuously on land or in the water, and some are torpid during the winter.

Linnaean characteristics

- Heart: 1 auricle, 1 ventricle. Cold, dark red blood
- Lungs: breathes uncertainly
- Jaw: incumbent
- Penis: (frequently) double
- Eggs: (usually) membranaceous
- Organs of Sense: tongue, nostrils, eyes, ears
- Covering: a naked skin
- Supports: various, in some none. Creeps in warm places and hisses

Linnaeus often regarded reptiles within the amphibian class because living in Sweden, he often noticed that the local reptiles (examples include the common adder and grass snake) would hunt and be active in the water.

In the 10th edition of Systema Naturae, Linnaeus included several species of fishes (that do not belong the superclass Osteichthyes) into the amphibian class. It was not until later on that he would merge them into the Fish class and give them their own new order "Chondropterygious", defining them as species with cartilaginous gills.

Linnaeus divided the amphibians based upon the limb structures and the way they breathed.

== Reptiles ==
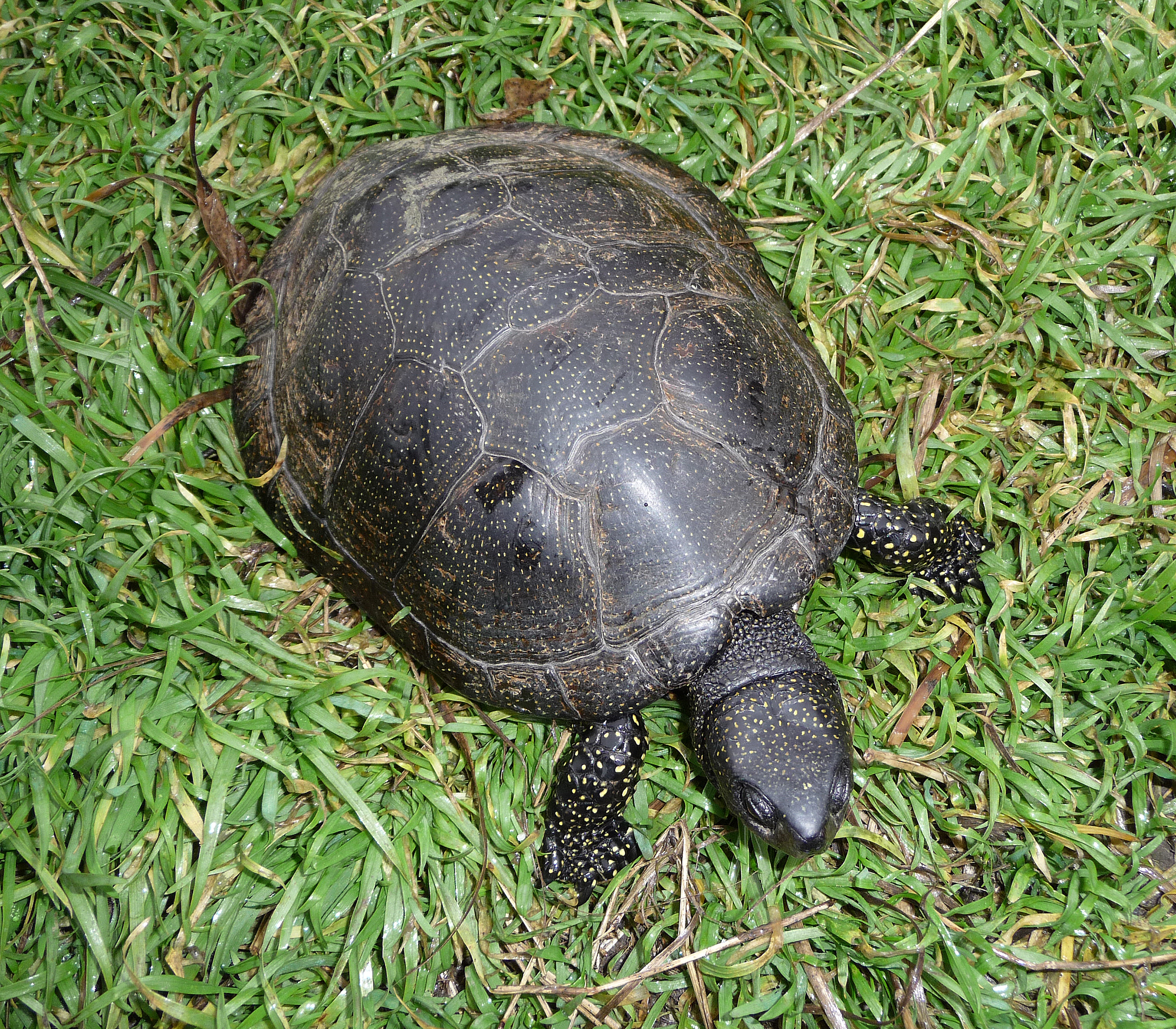
The European pond turtle was named Testudo orbicularis and Testudo lutaria in 1758.

Testudo (turtles & tortoises)

- Testudo mydas – Green sea turtle
- Testudo caretta – Loggerhead sea turtle
- Testudo orbicularis & Testudo lutaria – European pond turtle
- Testudo scabra – Spot-legged turtle
- Testudo graeca & Testudo pusilla – Spur-thighed tortoise
- Testudo carolina & Testudo carinata – Eastern box turtle
- Testudo geometrica – Geometric tortoise
- Testudo serpentina – Common snapping turtle

Draco (gliding lizards)

- Draco volans – Draco volans, Flying Dragon

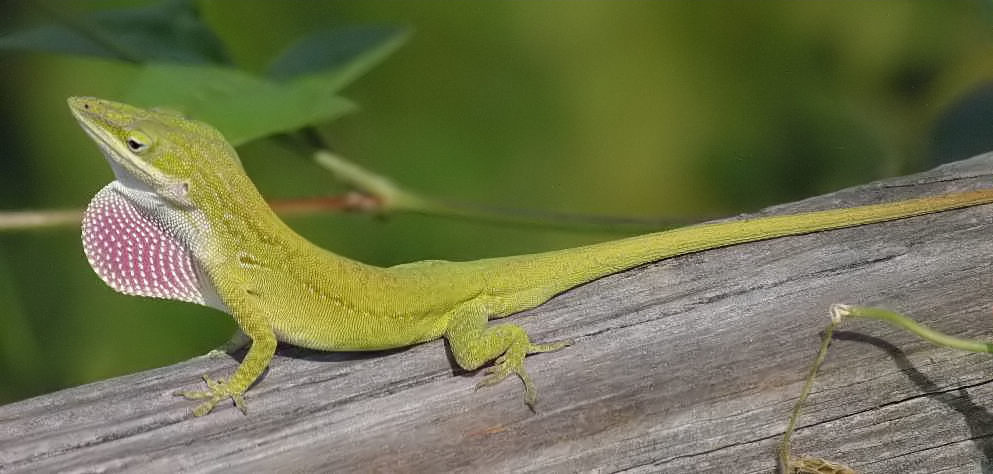
The Carolina anole was named Lacerta principalis in 1758.

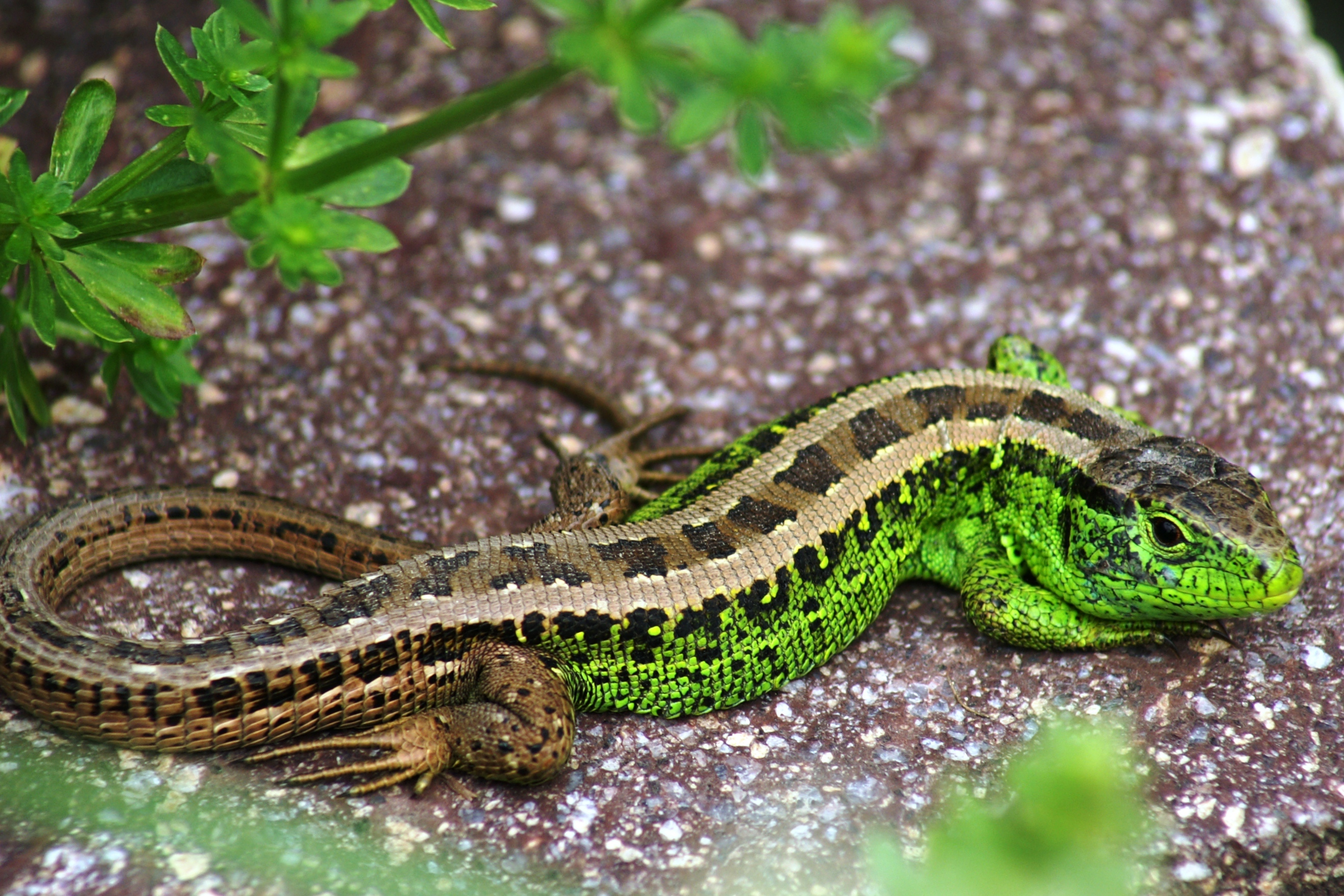
The Sand Lizard was named Lacerta agilis in 1758.

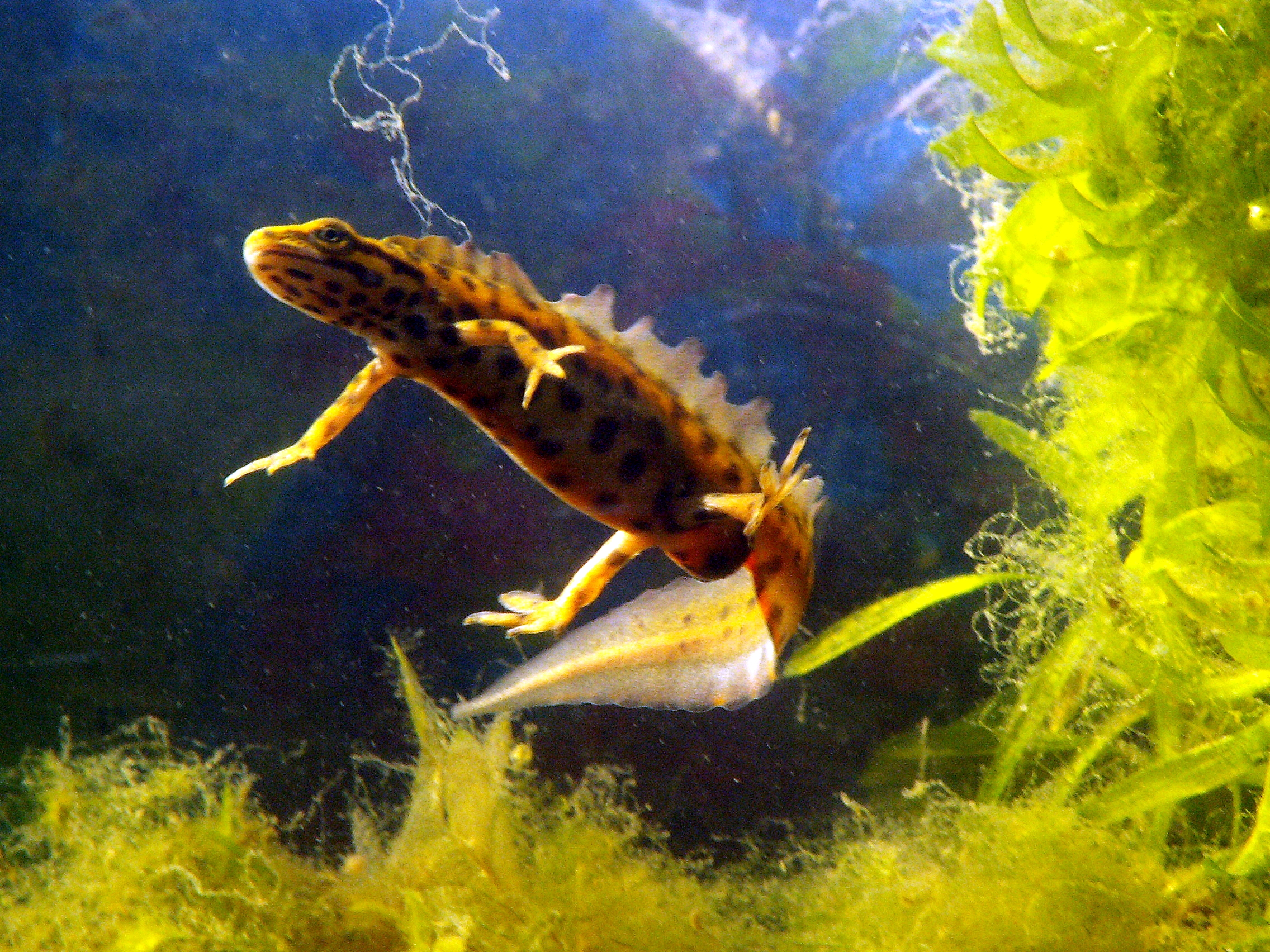
The Smooth Newt was named Lacerta vulgaris, Lacerta palustris and Lacerta aquatica in 1758.

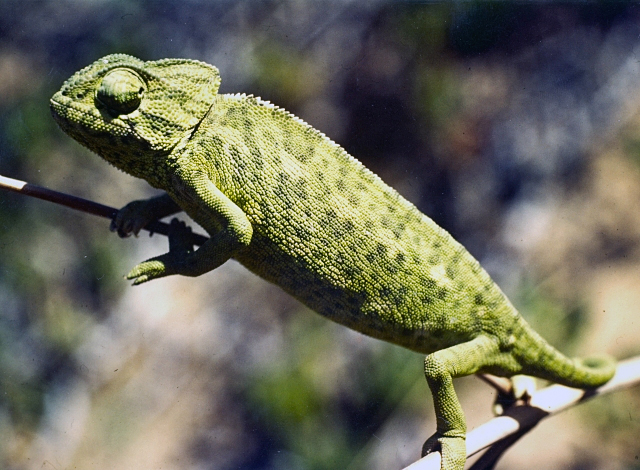
The Common Chameleon, Chamaeleo chamaeleon, was named Lacerta chameleon in 1758.

Lacerta (terrestrial lizards, salamanders, & crocodilians)

- Lacerta crocodilus – Caiman crocodilus, Spectacled Caiman
- Lacerta caudiverbera – [fictitious]
- Lacerta superciliosa – Uranoscodon superciliosa
- Lacerta scutata – Lyriocephalus scutatus
- Lacerta monitor – [rejected]
- Lacerta principalis – Carolina Anole
- Lacerta bicarinata – Neusticurus bicarinatus
- Lacerta palustris, Lacerta vulgaris, & Lacerta aquatica – Lissotriton vulgaris, Smooth newt
- Lacerta cordylus – Cordylus cordylus
- Lacerta stellio – Laudakia stellio
- Lacerta mauritanica – Tarentola mauritanica, European common gecko
- Lacerta azurea – Uracentron azureum
- Lacerta turcica – Hemidactylus turcicus, Mediterranean house gecko
- Lacerta ameiva – Ameiva ameiva, Giant Ameiva
- Lacerta agilis – Lacerta agilis, Sand Lizard
- Lacerta algira – Psammodromus algirus, Large Psammodromus
- Lacerta seps – Tetradactylus seps
- Lacerta angulata – Alopoglossus angulatus
- Lacerta chamaeleon – Chamaeleo chamaeleon, Common chameleon
- Lacerta salamandra – Fire salamander
- Lacerta gecko – Gekko gecko, Tokay gecko
- Lacerta scincus – Scincus scincus, Sandfish
- Lacerta hispida – Agama hispida
- Lacerta orbicularis – Phrynosoma orbiculare, Mexican plateau horned lizard
- Lacerta basiliscus – Basiliscus basiliscus, Common basilisk
- Lacerta iguana – Iguana iguana, Green iguana
- Lacerta calotes – Calotes calotes, Common green forest lizard
- Lacerta agama – Agama agama, Rock Agama
- Lacerta umbra – Plica umbra
- Lacerta plica – Plica plica
- Lacerta marmorata – Polychrus marmoratus
- Lacerta bullaris – Jamaican giant anole
- Lacerta strumosa – [nomen oblitum] for Anolis lineatusDaudin, 1802
- Lacerta teguixin – Tupinambis teguixin, Gold tegu
- Lacerta aurata
- Lacerta punctata – Riopa punctata
- Lacerta lemniscata – Cnemidophorus lemniscatus, Rainbow Whiptail
- Lacerta fasciata – Plestiodon fasciatus, Five-lined skink
- Lacerta lineata – Gymnophthalmus lineatus
- Lacerta chalcides – Chalcides chalcides, Three-toed skink
- Lacerta anguina – Chamaesaura anguina, Cape grass lizard

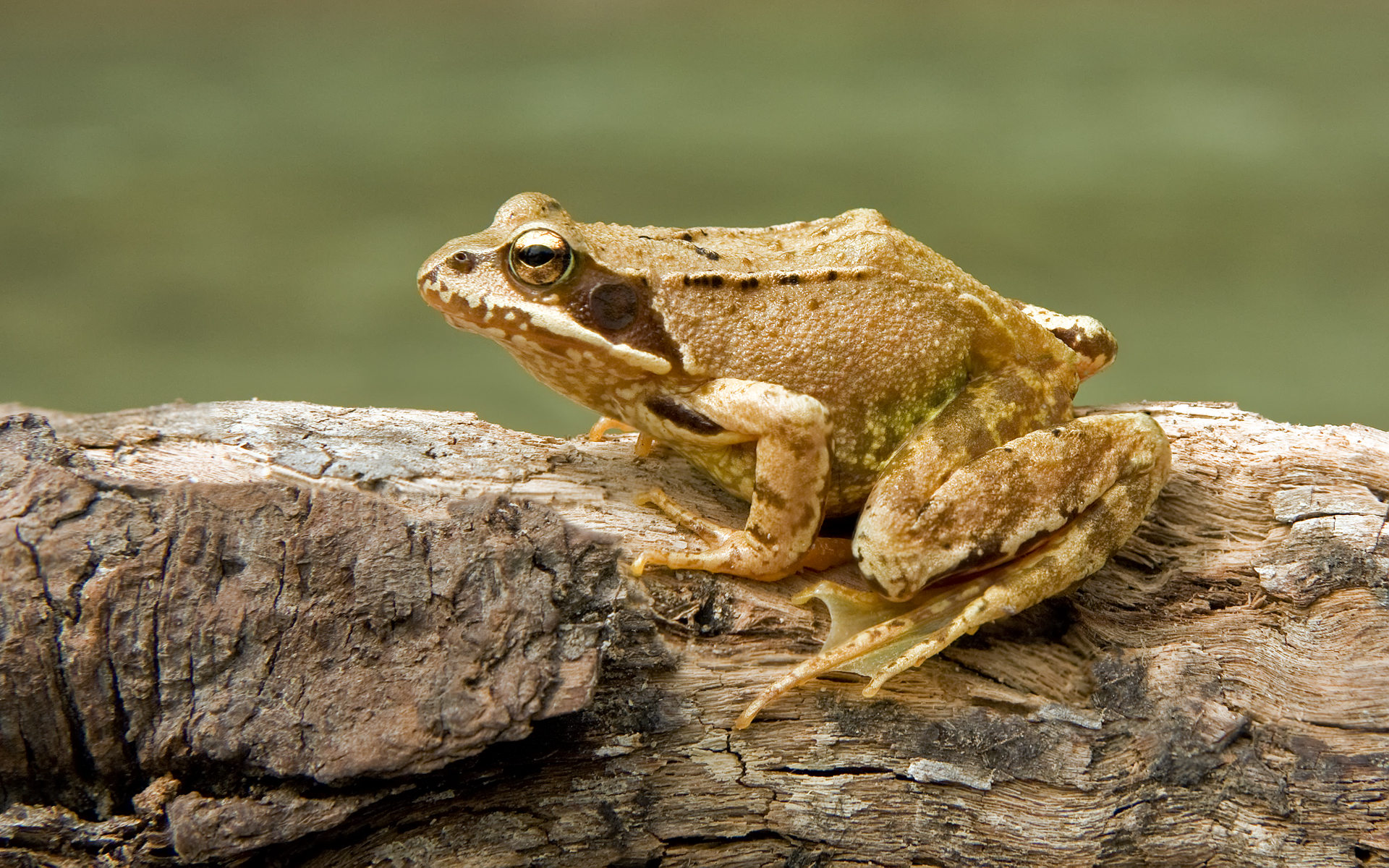
The Common Frog was named Rana temporaria in 1758.

Rana (frogs & toads) (Note: Except for Rana marginata, the modern identities of all Linnaeus' names in Rana are taken from Kitchell & Dundee (1994).)

- Rana pipa – Pipa pipa, Suriname Toad
- Rana bufo, Rana rubeta, & Rana ventricosa – Bufo bufo, Common Toad
- Rana gibbosa – Breviceps gibbosus, Cape Rain Frog
- Rana variegata – Bombina variegata, yellow-bellied toad
- Rana marina – Bufo marinus, cane toad
- Rana typhonia – Trachycephalus typhonius
- Rana ocellata – Osteopilus ocellatus
- Rana cornuta – Ceratophrys cornuta, Surinam horned frog
- Rana marginata – [nomen dubium]
- Rana paradoxa – Pseudis paradoxa, paradoxical frog
- Rana temporaria – Rana temporaria, Common Frog, and Rana arvalis, Moor Frog
- Rana esculenta – Rana esculenta, Edible Frog
- Rana arborea & Rana hyla – Hyla arborea, European tree frog
- Rana boans – Hypsiboas boans

== Serpentes ==
(Note: The modern identities of all Linnaeus' Serpentes taxa (genera Crotalus, Boa (except Boa scytale), Coluber, Anguis, Amphisbaena and Caecilia) are taken from Kitchell & Dundee (1994).)

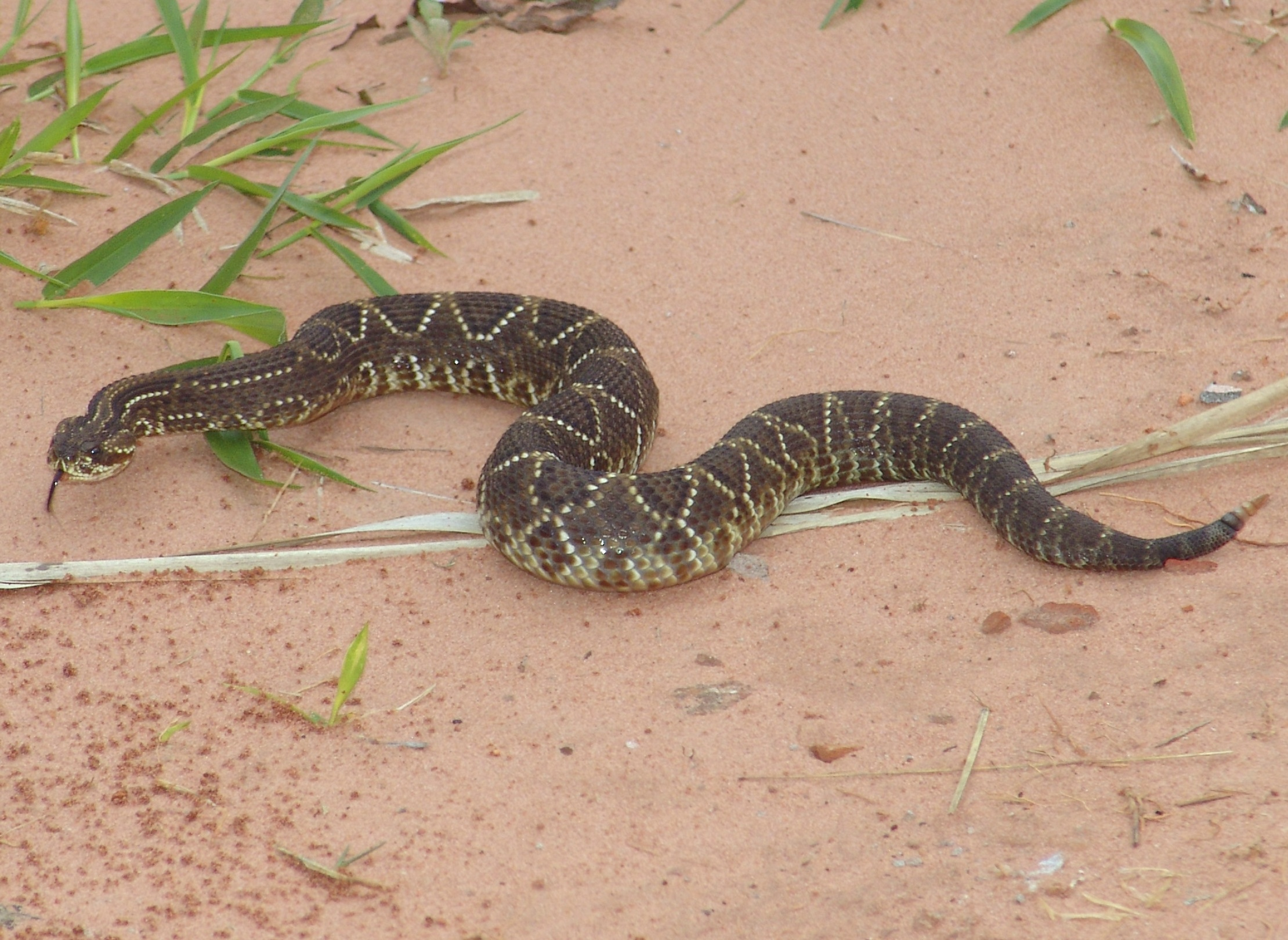
The South American Rattlesnake was named Crotalus durissus in 1758.

Crotalus (rattlesnakes)

- Crotalus horridus – Crotalus horridus
- Crotalus dryinas & Crotalus durissus – Crotalus durissus

Boa (boas)

- Boa murina & Boa scytale – Eunectes murinus, anaconda
- Boa canina & Boa hypnale – Corallus caninus, emerald tree boa
- Boa constrictor & Boa orophias – Boa constrictor
- Boa cenchria – Epicrates cenchria
- Boa enydris & Boa hortulana – Corallus hortulanus

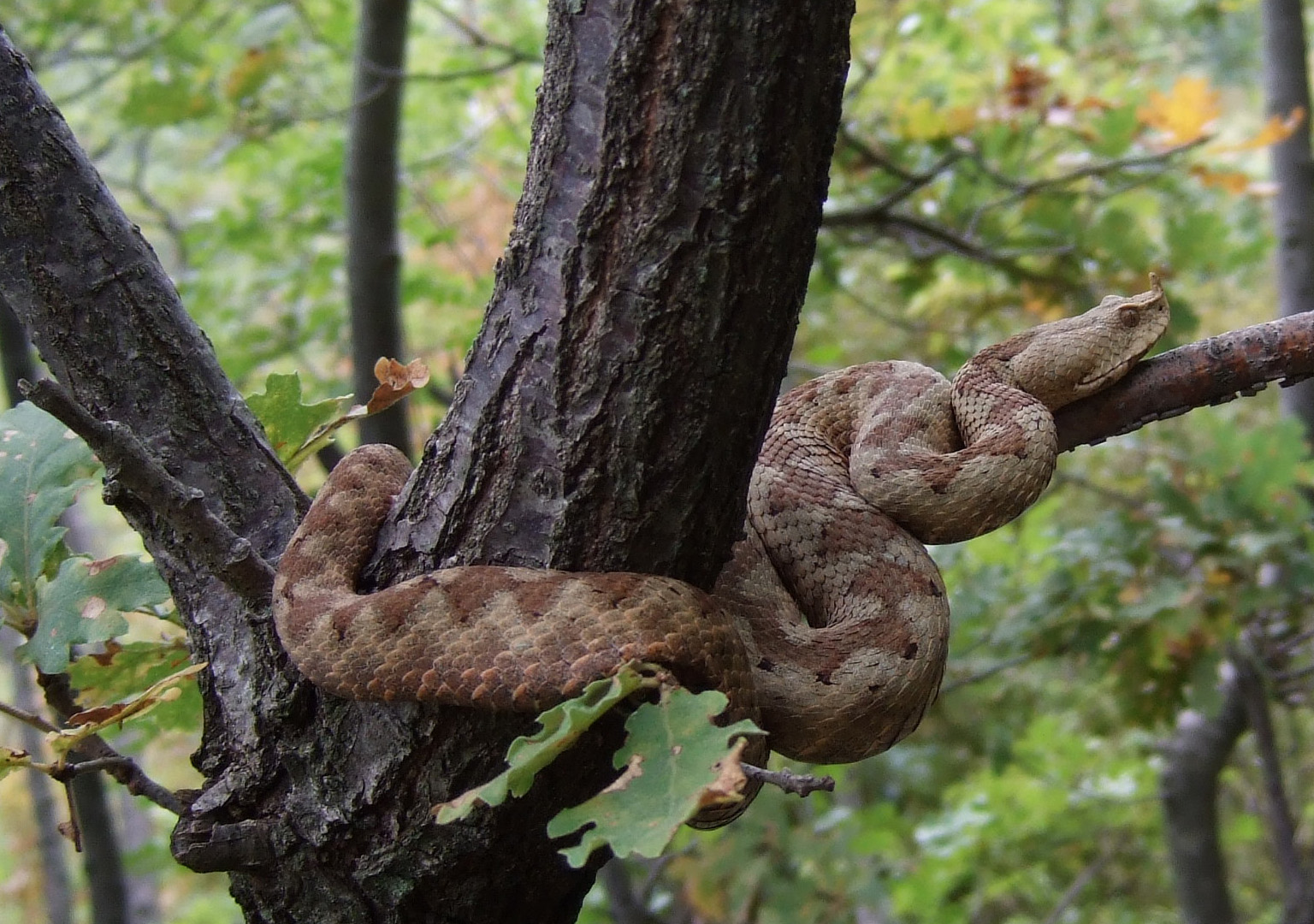
Vipera ammodytes was named Coluber ammodytes in 1758.

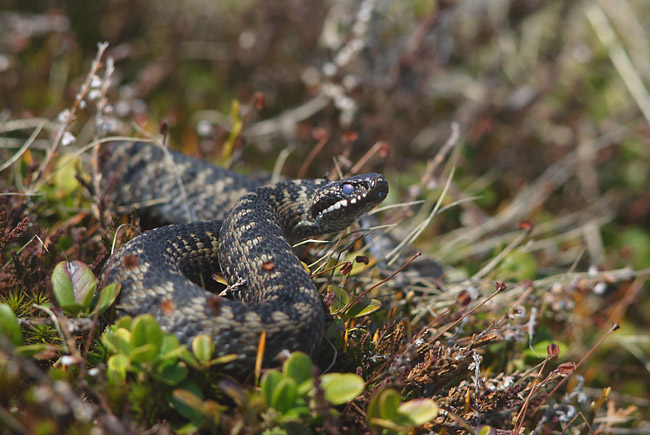
Vipera berus was named Coluber berus in 1758.

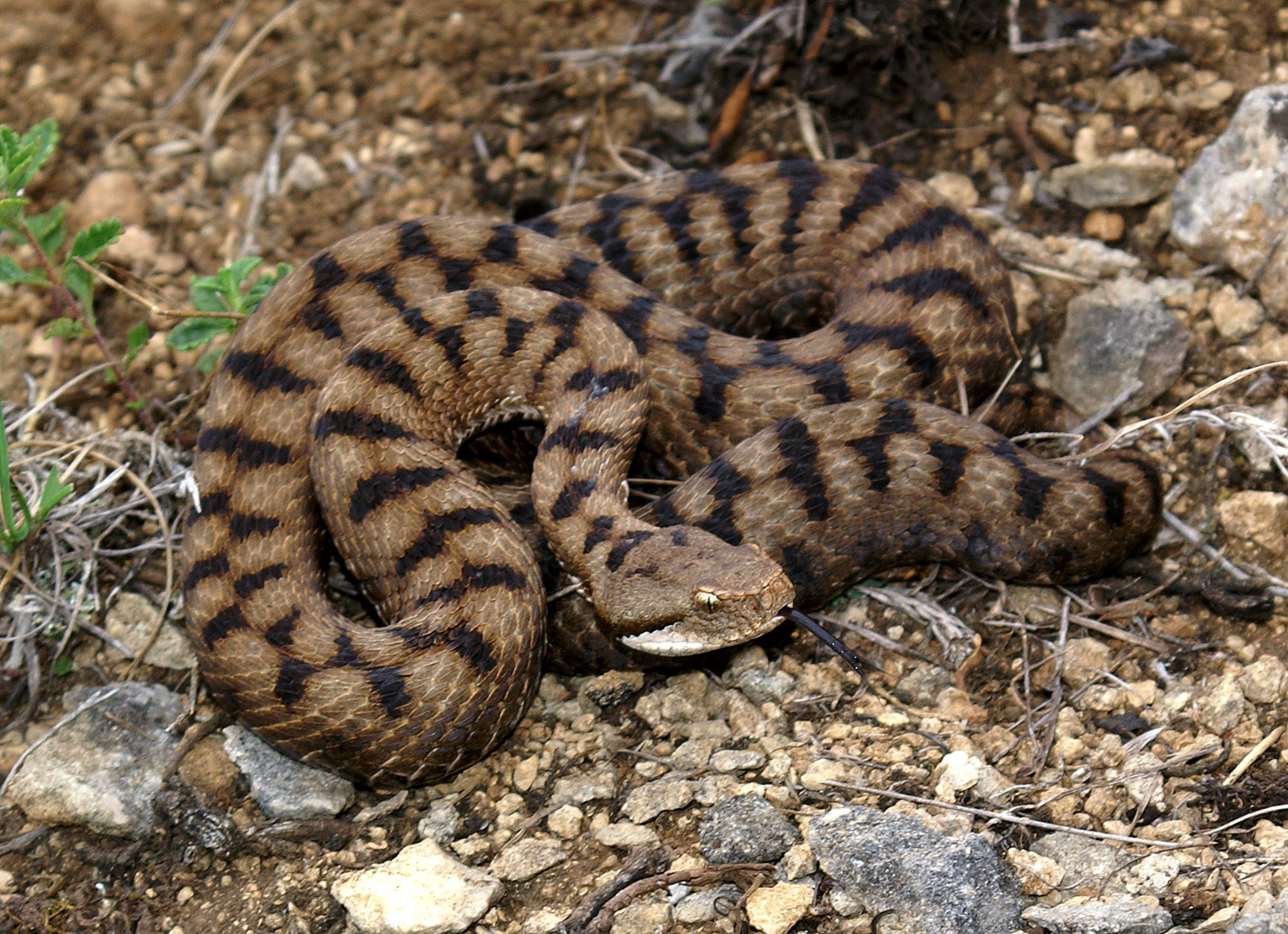
Vipera aspis was named Coluber aspis in 1758.

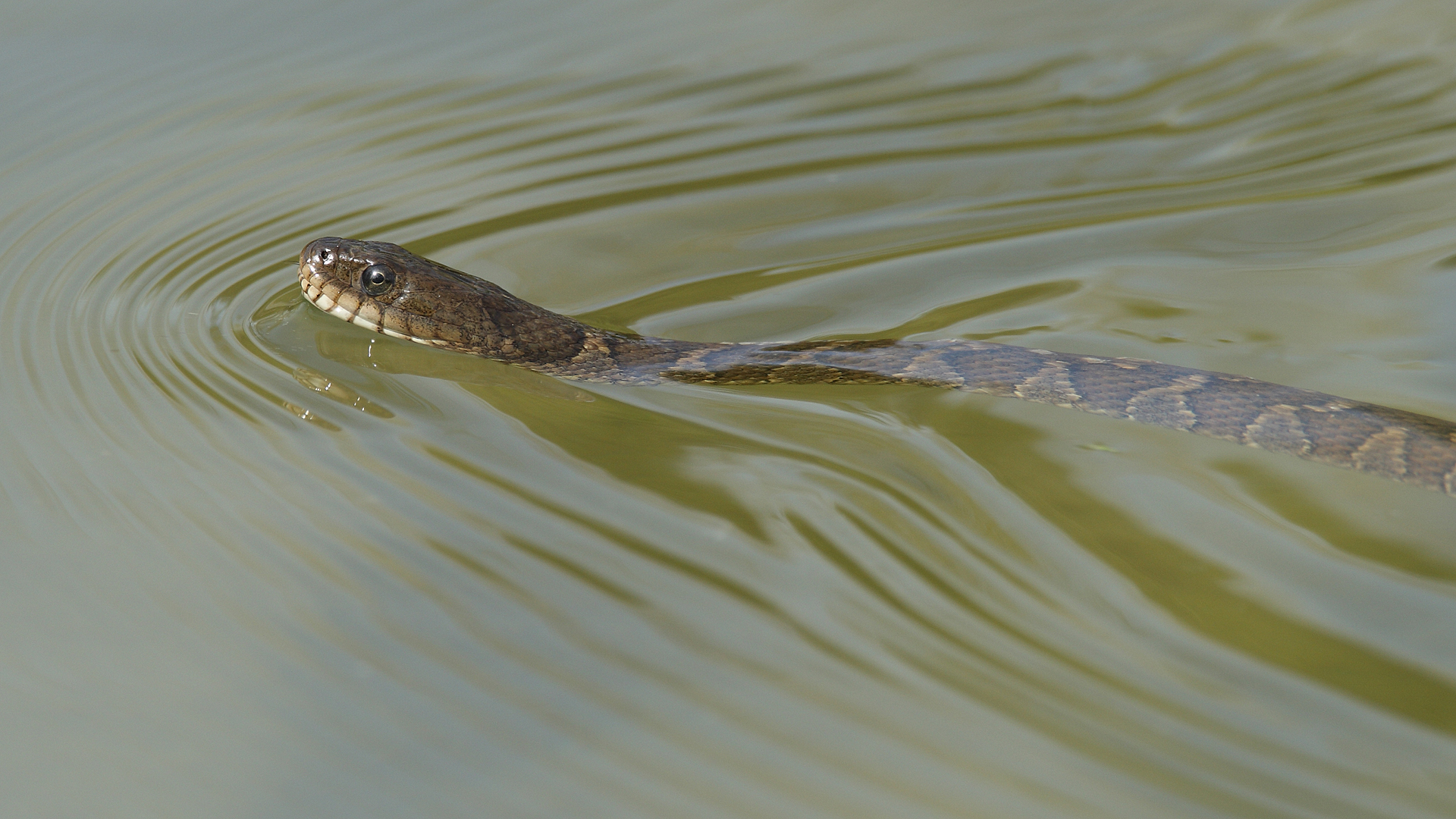
The northern water snake, Nerodia sepodon, was named Coluber sepodon in 1758.

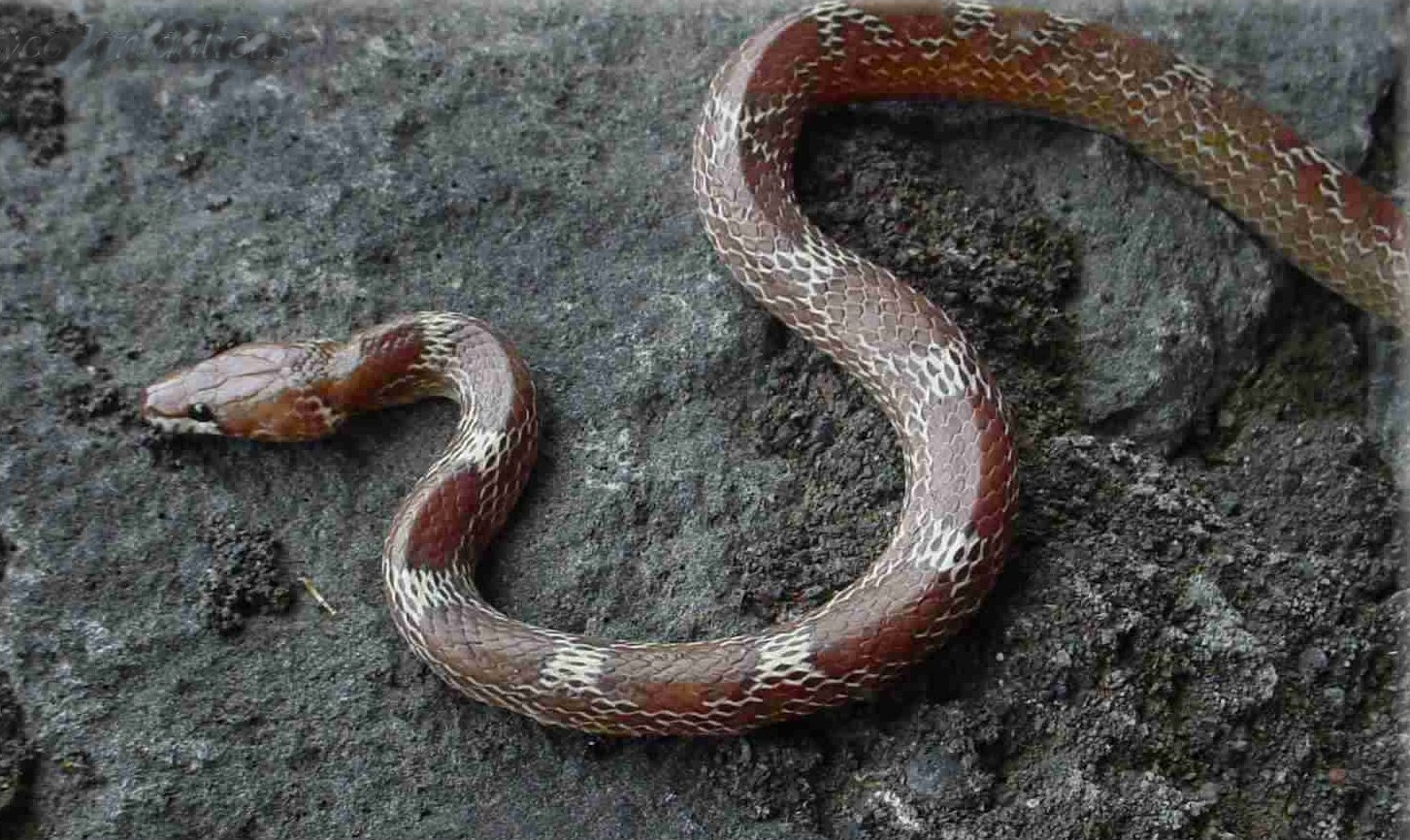
Lycodon aulicus was named Coluber aulicus in 1758.

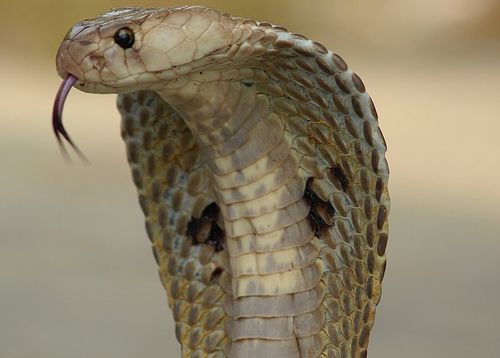
The Indian cobra was named Coluber naja in 1758.

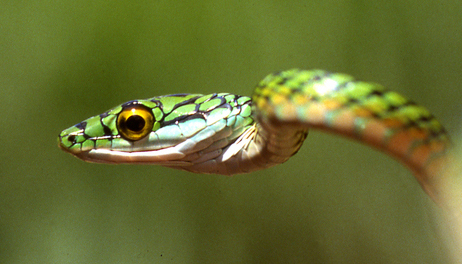
Leptophis ahaetulla was named Coluber ahaetulla in 1758.

Coluber (racers, vipers & cobras)

- Coluber vipera – Cerastes vipera
- Coluber atropos – Bitis atropos
- Coluber leberis – [suppressed]
- Coluber lutrix – Duberria lutrix
- Coluber calamarius – Oligodon calamarius
- Coluber constrictor – Coluber constrictor
- Coluber ammodytes – Vipera ammodytes
- Coluber cerastes – Cerastes cerastes
- Coluber plicatilis – Pseudoeryx plicatilis
- Coluber domicella – Erythrolampus poecilogyrus
- Coluber alidras – perhaps Helicops angulatus
- Coluber buccatus – Homalopsis buccata
- Coluber angulatus – Helicops angulatus
- Coluber berus & Coluber chersea – Vipera berus
- Coluber caeruleus – [nomen dubium]
- Coluber albus – Brachyorrhos albus
- Coluber aspis – Vipera aspis
- Coluber typhlus – Erythrolampus typhlus
- Coluber lebetinus – Macrovipera lebetina
- Coluber melanocephalus – Tantilla melanocephala
- Coluber cobella – Erythrolampus cobella
- Coluber reginae – Erythrolampus reginae
- Coluber severus – Xenodon severus
- Coluber aurora – Lamprophis aurora
- Coluber sipedon – Nerodia sipedon, northern water snake
- Coluber maurus – Natrix maura
- Coluber stolatus – Amphiesma stolatum, buff-striped keelback
- Coluber vittatus – Xenochrophis vittatus, striped keelback
- Coluber miliaris – Erythrolamprus miliaris
- Coluber rhombeatus – Psammophylax rhombeatus
- Coluber cyaneus – [nomen dubium]
- Coluber natrix – Natrix natrix, grass snake
- Coluber aesculapii & Coluber agilis – Erythrolamprus aesculapii
- Coluber lacteus – Homoroselaps lacteus
- Coluber aulicus – Lycodon aulicus, Indian wolf snake
- Coluber monilis – [nomen dubium]
- Coluber pallidus – Thamnodynastes pallidus
- Coluber lineatus – Lygophis lineatus
- Coluber naja – Naja naja, Indian cobra
- Coluber padera – [nomen dubium]
- Coluber canus – Pseudaspis cana, mole snake
- Coluber sibilans – Psammophis sibilans
- Coluber laticaudatus – Laticauda laticaudata
- Coluber sirtalis – Thamnophis sirtalis, common garter snake
- Coluber atrox – Bothrops atrox
- Coluber sibon & Coluber nebulatus – Sibon nebulatus, clouded snake
- Coluber fuscus & Coluber saturninus – Chironius fuscus
- Coluber candidus – Bungarus candidus
- Coluber niveus – Naja nivea, Cape cobra
- Coluber scaber – Dasypeltis scabra, common egg-eater
- Coluber carinatus – Chironius carinatus, machete savane
- Coluber corallinus – Erythrolampus triscalis
- Coluber ovivorus – perhaps Pantherophis vulpinus, fox snake
- Coluber exoletus – Chironius exoletus
- Coluber situla – Zamenis situla, European ratsnake
- Coluber triscalis – Erythrolampus triscalis
- Coluber lemniscatus – Micrurus lemniscatus
- Coluber annulatus – Leptodeira annulata, machete savane
- Coluber dipsas – [nomen dubium]
- Coluber pelias – Chrysopelea pelias, banded flying snake
- Coluber tyria – [nomen dubium]
- Coluber jugularis – Dolichophis jugularis
- Coluber petola – Oxyrhopus petolarius
- Coluber molurus – Python molurus
- Coluber ahaetulla – Leptophis ahaetulla
- Coluber petolarius – Oxyrhopus petolarius
- Coluber haje – Naja haje, Egyptian cobra
- Coluber filiformis – [nomen dubium]
- Coluber pullatus – Spilotes pullatus, tigre
- Coluber hippocrepis – Hemorrhois hippocrepis, horseshoe whip snake
- Coluber minervae – Lygophis lineatus
- Coluber cinereus – perhaps Liophis cobella
- Coluber viridissimus – Philodryas viridissima
- Coluber mucosus – Ptyas mucosa
- Coluber cenchoa – Imantodes cenchoa
- Coluber mycterizans – Ahaetulla mycterizans
- Coluber caerulescens – [nomen dubium]
- Coluber arges – [mythical]

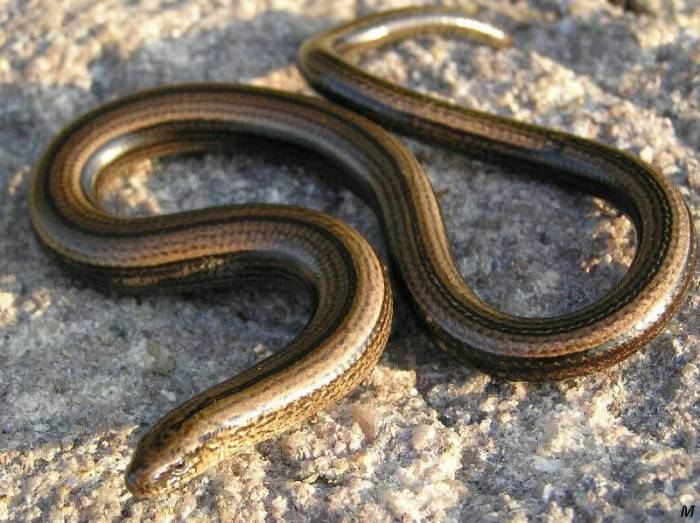
The slowworm was named Anguis fragilis in 1758.

Anguis (slowworms & worm snakes)

- Anguis bipes – Scelotes bipes
- Anguis meleagris – Acontias meleagris
- Anguis colubrina – Gongylophis colubrinus, Egyptian sand boa
- Anguis jaculus & Anguis cerastes – Eryx jaculus, javelin sand boa
- Anguis maculata – Cylindrophis maculatus, Ceylonese cylinder snake
- Anguis reticulata – Typhlops reticulatus, reticulate worm snake
- Anguis lumbricalis – Typhlops lumbricalis, earthworm worm snake
- Anguis laticauda – [nomen dubium]
- Anguis scytale – Anilius scytale
- Anguis eryx – part of Anguis fragilis, slowworm
- Anguis fragilis – Anguis fragilis, slowworm

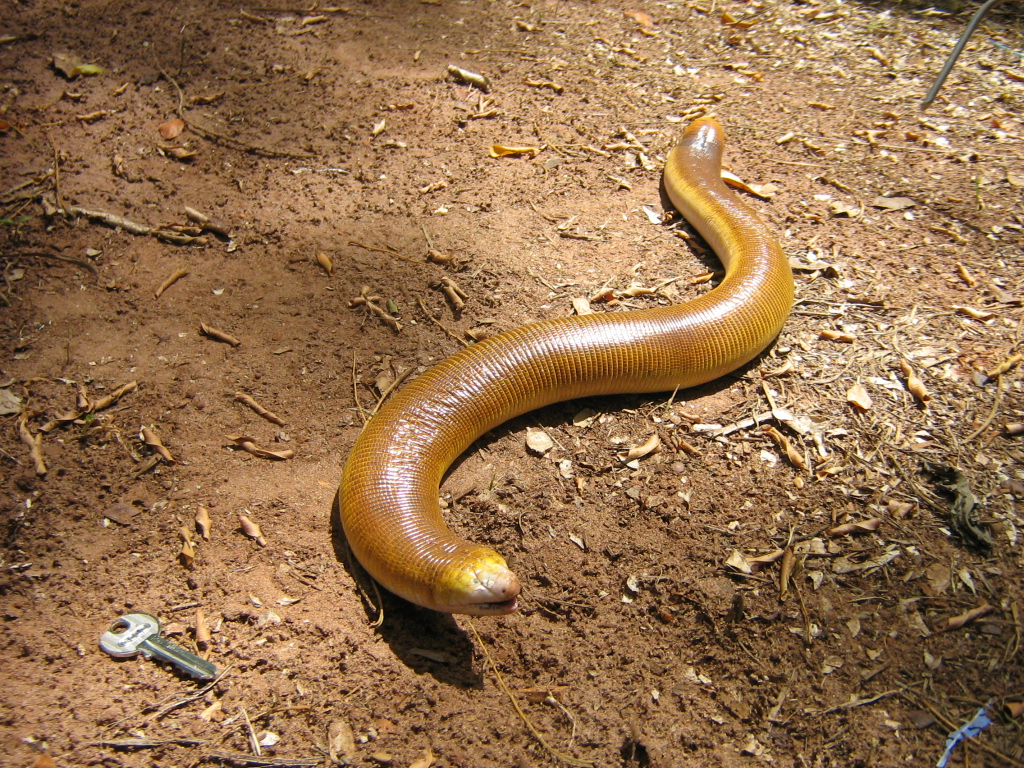
The red worm lizard was named Amphisbaena alba in 1758.

Amphisbaena (worm lizards)

- Amphisbaena fuliginosa – Amphisbaena fuliginosa, spotted worm lizard
- Amphisbaena alba – Amphisbaena alba, red worm lizard

Caecilia (caecilians)

- Caecilia tentaculata – Caecilia tentaculata
- Caecilia glutinosa – Ichthyophis glutinosus, Ceylon caecilian

== Nantes ==
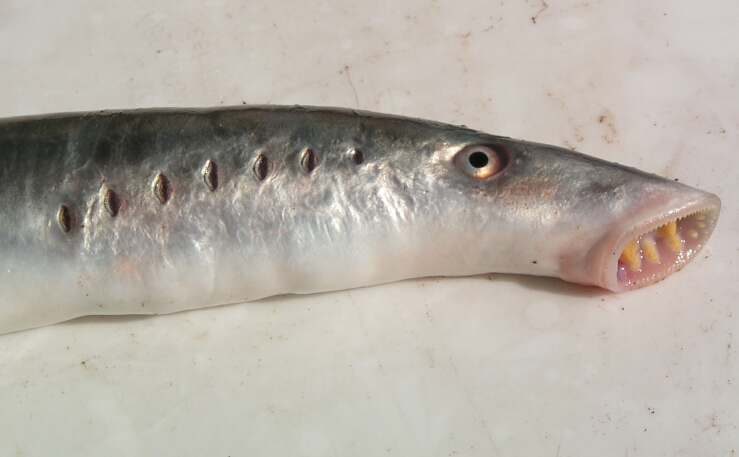
The European river lamprey was named Petromyzon fluviatilis and Petromyzon branchialis in 1758.

Petromyzon (lampreys)

- Petromyzon marinus – Sea Lamprey
- Petromyzon fluviatilis & Petromyzon branchialis – European river lamprey

Raja (rays)

- Raja torpedo – Common torpedo
- Raja batis – Common skate
- Raja oxyrinchus – Long-nosed burton skate
- Raja miraletus – Brown ray
- Raja fullonica – Shagreen ray
- Raja aquila – Common eagle ray
- Raja altavela – Spiny butterfly ray
- Raja pastinaca – Common stingray
- Raja clavata – Thornback ray
- Raja rhinobatos – Common guitarfish

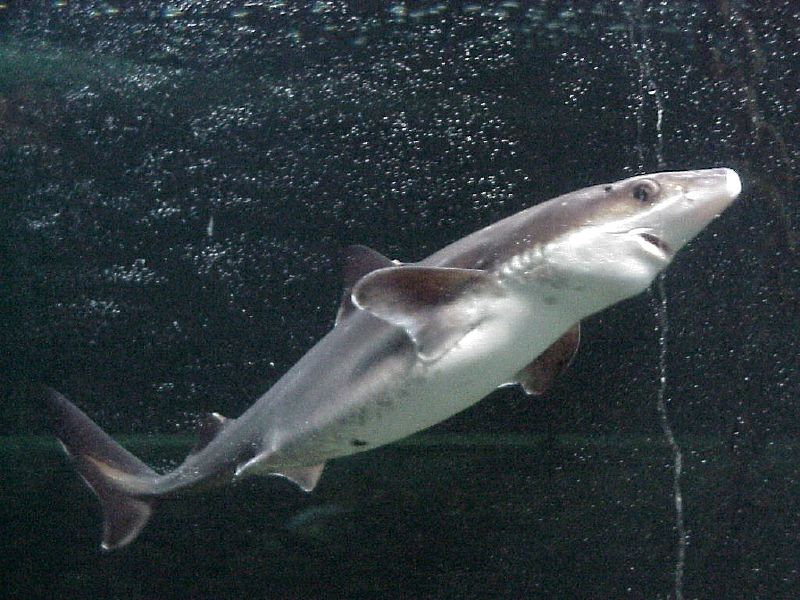
The spiny dogfish was named Squalus acanthias in 1758.

Squalus (sharks)

- Squalus acanthias – Spiny dogfish
- Squalus centrina – Angular roughshark
- Squalus spinax – Velvet belly lantern shark
- Squalus squatina – Angelshark
- Squalus zygaena – Smooth hammerhead shark
- Squalus tiburo – Bonnethead shark
- Squalus galeus – School shark
- Squalus canicula & Squalus catulus – Small-spotted catshark
- Squalus stellaris – Nursehound
- Squalus glaucus – Blue shark
- Squalus carcharias – Great white shark
- Squalus mustelus – Common smooth-hound
- Squalus pristis – Common sawfish

Chimaera (ratfishes)

- Chimaera monstrosa – Rabbitfish
- Chimaera callorynchus – Elephantfish

Lophius (anglerfishes)

- Lophius piscatorius – Angler
- Lophius vespertilio – Brazilian batfish
- Lophius histrio – Sargassumfish

Acipenser (sturgeons)

- Acipenser sturio – European Sea Sturgeon
- Acipenser ruthenus – Sterlet
- Acipenser huso – Beluga Sturgeon
- Acipenser plecostomus – Suckermouth Catfish
