= A. meleagris =

A. meleagris may refer to:

- Acontias meleagris, a skink species in the genus Acontias
- Arothron meleagris, a pufferfish species
