= Zoarvlei Wetlands =

Wetland reserve of about in the city of Cape Town, South Africa

- Location within Cape Town
- Location: Cape Town, South Africa
- Coordinates: 33.89751°S 18.48492°E
- Area: 140 ha (350 acres)

Zoarvlei Wetlands is a wetland reserve of about 140 ha (350 acres) in the city of Cape Town, South Africa. It forms part of the larger Table Bay Nature Reserve proclaimed in June 2012.

It protects diverse bird life, including a variety of water birds and gulls. The wetland is covered in reeds, with some open water. The dry land preserves a range of spring and annual flowers. The reserve is located next to the suburb of Paarden Eiland, close to the city centre.

== See also ==
- Table Bay Nature Reserve
- Biodiversity of Cape Town
- List of nature reserves in Cape Town
- Cape Lowland Freshwater Wetland
