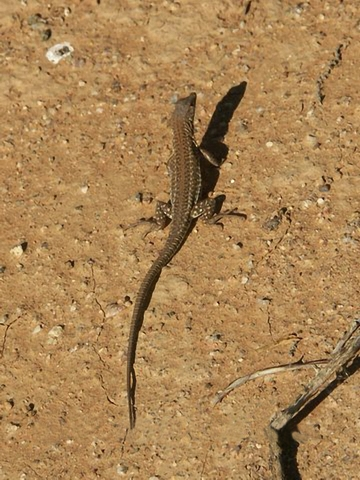

Conservation status
- Least Concern (IUCN 3.1)

Scientific classification
- Kingdom: Animalia
- Phylum: Chordata
- Class: Reptilia
- Order: Squamata
- Family: Lacertidae
- Genus: Meroles
- Species: M. knoxii

Binomial name
- Meroles knoxii (Milne-Edwards, 1829)

Synonyms
- Eremias knoxii (Milne-Edwards, 1829); Lacerta knoxii Milne-Edwards, 1829; Scapteira knoxii (Milne-Edwards, 1829); Scaptira knoxii (Milne-Edwards, 1829); Scaptira knoxii pequensis Hewitt, 1935

= Meroles knoxii =

Species of lizard

Meroles knoxii, also known commonly as Knox's desert lizard and Knox's ocellated sand lizard, is a species of sand-dwelling lizard in the family Lacertidae. The species is native to southern Africa.

== Etymology ==
The specific name, knoxii, is in honor of Scottish anatomist Robert Knox.

== Description ==
Adults of M. knoxii usually have a snout-to-vent length (SVL) of 5.5–6.5 cm (2.2–2.6 in). The ear openings are visible. The toes are slightly fringed. Dorsally, the body is brownish, with a striped and spotted pattern. Ventrally, it is bluish gray to cream-colored, except during breeding season when males have a bright yellow chin, throat, and anal region.

== Geographic range ==
M. knoxii occurs in Namibia and South Africa.

== Habitat ==
The preferred natural habitat of M. knoxii is shrubland.

== Behavior ==
M. knoxii is terrestrial, diurnal, and active, dashing across sandy soil from shrub to shrub.

== Diet ==
M. knoxii preys upon beetles, flies, and other insects.

== Reproduction ==
M. knoxii is oviparous.
