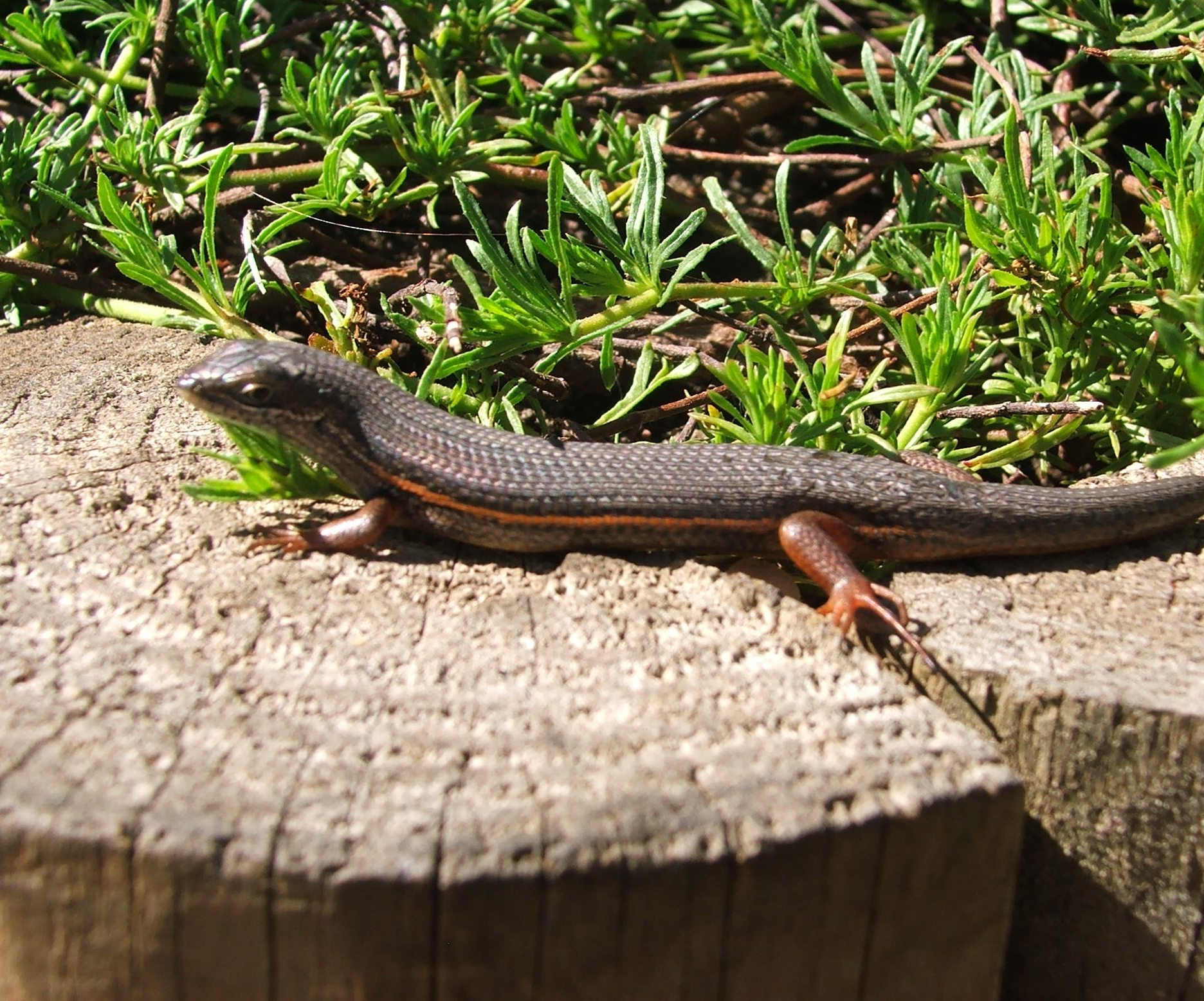

Scientific classification
- Kingdom: Animalia
- Phylum: Chordata
- Class: Reptilia
- Order: Squamata
- Family: Scincidae
- Genus: Trachylepis
- Species: T. homalocephala

Binomial name
- Trachylepis homalocephala (Wiegmann, 1828)

Synonyms
- Scincus homolocephalus [sic] Wiegmann, 1828; Tiliqua homolocephalus — Gray, 1831; Mabuia homalocephala [sic] — Boulenger, 1887; Mabuya homalocephala — V. FitzSimons, 1943; Euprepis homalocephalus — Mausfeld et al., 2002; Trachylepis homalocephala — Bauer, 2003

= Trachylepis homalocephala =

Species of lizard

Trachylepis homalocephala, commonly known as the red-sided skink, is a small, slender species of skink in the subfamily Mabuyinae.

== Geographic range and habitat ==
T. homalocephala is indigenous to Southern Africa, where it typically occurs in coastal thicket and leaf litter along the South African coast, from Cape Town eastwards along the coast as far as Mozambique. A few tiny isolated populations also occur in moist mountainous areas further inland.

== Description ==
This small, elegant skink has a shiny, brightly striped body. Males change colour in the breeding season, developing bright red stripes on their flanks.

== Reproduction ==
The adult female red-sided skink lays around six eggs in summer.

== Taxonomy ==
T. homalocephala was first described in 1828 by Wiegmann (who named it Scincus homolocephalus), based on specimens at the Natural History Museum in Berlin that were collected in South Africa by Ludwig Krebs.

== In captivity ==
Red-sided skinks are popular in the pet trade.
