= Tetragonia spicata =

Scientific classification
- Kingdom: Plantae
- Clade: Tracheophytes
- Clade: Angiosperms
- Clade: Eudicots
- Order: Caryophyllales
- Family: Aizoaceae
- Genus: Tetragonia
- Species: T. spicata

Binomial name
- Tetragonia spicata L.

Species of succulent

Tetragonia spicata is a Southern African perennial shrub or scrambler.

== Description ==
The species is highly variable but can be recognised by its leaves which are flat (not folded or revolute) and on clear stalks (petiolate).

The flowers are in groups (rarely solitary) in a leafless terminal inflorescence, born on a herbaceous stem. The fruit is small and has a clear secondary ridge.

=== Related species ===
This species is frequently confused with Tetragonia arbuscula, but T. spicata is more herbaceous (less woody), with larger leaves, flowers that are not strictly axillary and secondary ridges between the wings of its fruits.
