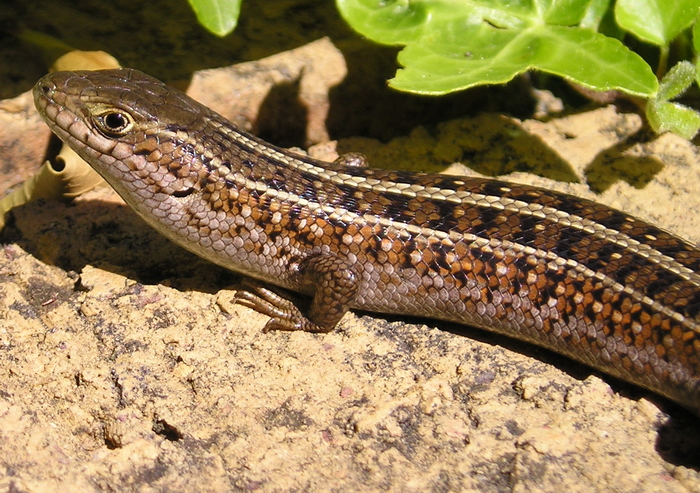

Conservation status
- Least Concern (IUCN 3.1)

Scientific classification
- Kingdom: Animalia
- Phylum: Chordata
- Class: Reptilia
- Order: Squamata
- Family: Scincidae
- Genus: Trachylepis
- Species: T. capensis

Binomial name
- Trachylepis capensis (Gray, 1831)

Synonyms
- Tiliqua capensis Gray, 1831; Herinia capensis — Gray, 1839; Mabuya capensis — V. FitzSimons, 1943; Euprepis capensis — Mausfeld et al., 2002; Trachylepis capensis — Bauer, 2003

= Trachylepis capensis =

Species of lizard

Trachylepis capensis is a species of skink, a lizard in the family Scincidae. The species is native to southern Africa.

== Naming ==
Named for the Cape of Good Hope, T. trachylepis is commonly known as the Cape skink or Cape three-lined skink, and it has recently been reassigned to the genus Trachylepis (previously it was classified in Mabuya).

== Appearance ==
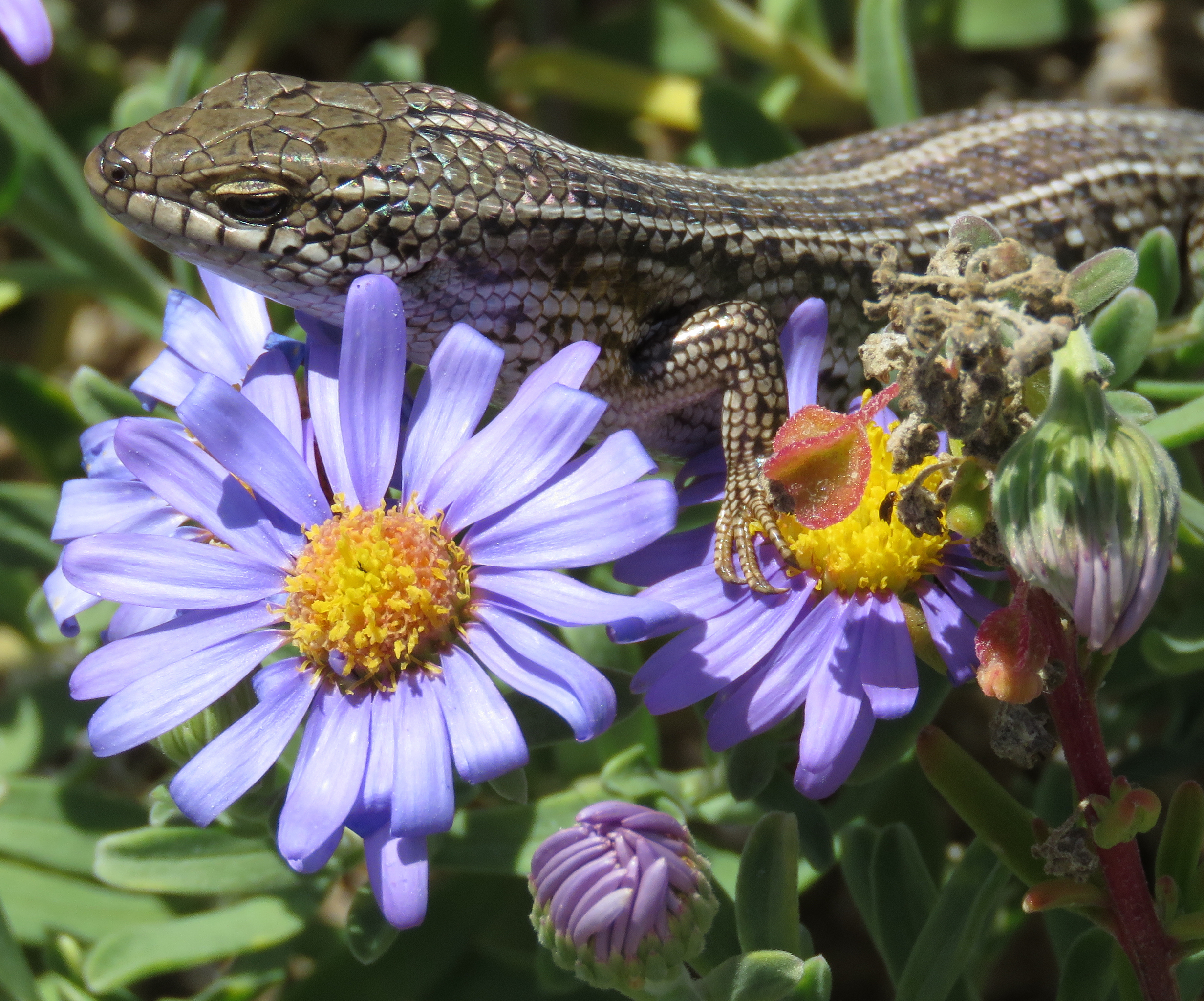
A Cape skink in low-level vegetation

T. capensis is a large (sometimes quite fat) skink, with three light stripes running down its back. Its skin is olive-brown to gray, and between the stripes and on its flanks are many small dark spots. The belly is greyish white. Occasionally the stripes on the back can be quite pale. Its body is rather elongated and the limbs are short.

== Distribution ==
T. capensis is indigenous to South Africa and can be found throughout most of the country. It also occurs in Botswana, Namibia, and Zambia; a few isolated (probably relict) populations have been found in Zimbabwe.

== Biology ==
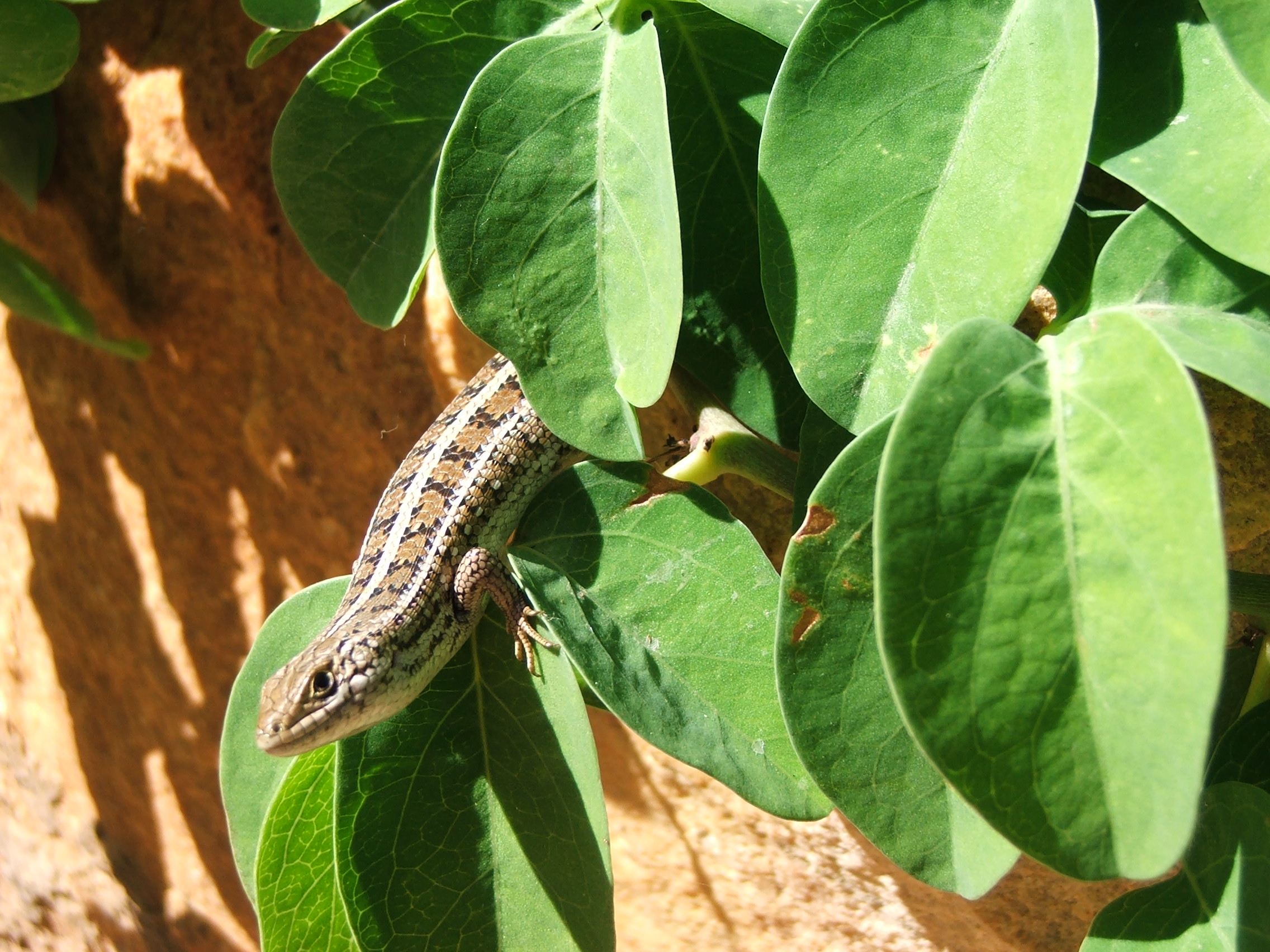
The Cape skink is still seen in suburban gardens.

T. capensis is still common in suburban gardens across South Africa and because of this, the Cape skink is probably the best known lizard in the country. Furthermore, in the presence of humans it gradually becomes domesticated and after some time it can become sufficiently trusting to eat out of one's hand. Consequently, it is becoming increasingly popular as a pet, whether kept in a formal UV-fitted vivarium or allowed to roam free in a garden. Tame individuals have a tendency to become quite overweight. The increasingly dense populations of domestic cats being kept as pets in suburban areas have led to the extermination of this little forager from much of its natural range, as these introduced predators will typically kill all the skinks in the immediate area. Its natural predators in the wild include the fiscal shrike and various snakes.

For a home, the Cape skink usually digs itself a small tunnel at the foot of a boulder or tree, but anything that it can hide under is used as a temporary shelter. In its natural habitat it is considerably more shy, though it can often be heard as it scuttles away through the bushes. This species of skink is live-bearing and gives birth to litters of about a dozen babies.
