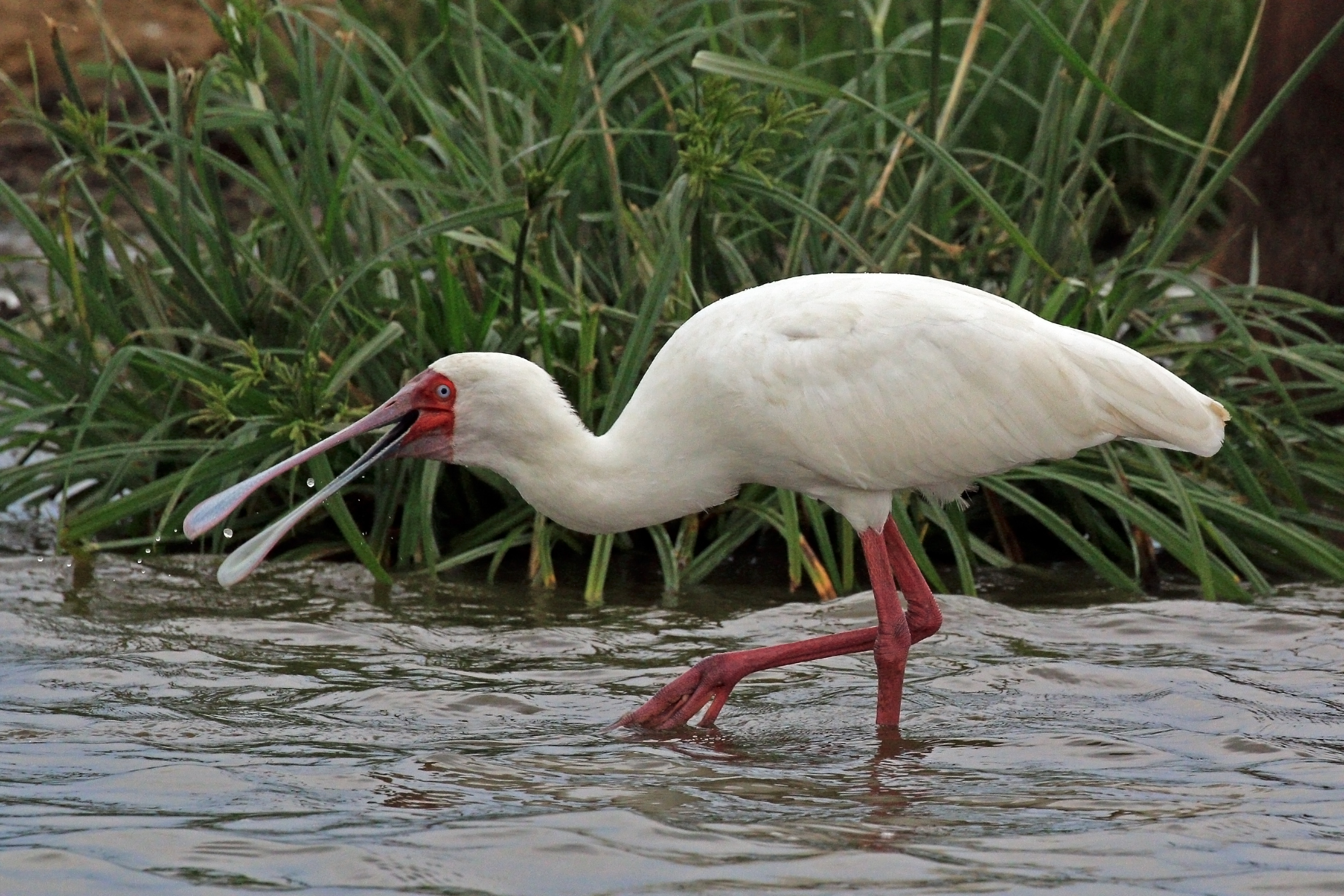
- Kazinga Channel, Uganda

Conservation status
- Least Concern (IUCN 3.1)

Scientific classification
- Kingdom: Animalia
- Phylum: Chordata
- Class: Aves
- Order: Pelecaniformes
- Family: Threskiornithidae
- Genus: Platalea
- Species: P. alba

Binomial name
- Platalea alba Scopoli, 1786

Synonyms
- Platalea tenuirostris Temminck, 1820

= African spoonbill =

Species of bird

The African spoonbill (Platalea alba) is a long-legged wading bird of the ibis and spoonbill family Threskiornithidae. The species is widespread across Africa and Madagascar, including Botswana, Kenya, Mozambique, Namibia, South Africa, and Zimbabwe. The species belongs to the genus Platalea, which also includes species such as the Black-faced spoonbill, Eurasian spoonbill, and Roseate spoonbill.

== Biology ==
The African spoonbill lives in marshy wetlands with some open shallow water and nests in colonies in trees or reedbeds. They usually don't share colonies with storks or herons. They feed by moving its flat bill side to side throughout shallow water, snapping up fish, molluscs, amphibians, crustaceans, and insects when detected. Long legs and thin, pointed toes enable it to walk easily through varying depths of water. Juveniles are born with shorter bills that gradually develop into the species' unique spoon-shaped form as they mature.

The African spoonbill is almost unmistakable through most of its range. The breeding bird is all white except for its red legs and face and long grey spatulate bill. It has no crest, unlike the common spoonbill. Immature birds lack the red face and have a yellow bill. Unlike herons, spoonbills fly with their necks outstretched.

== Breeding ==
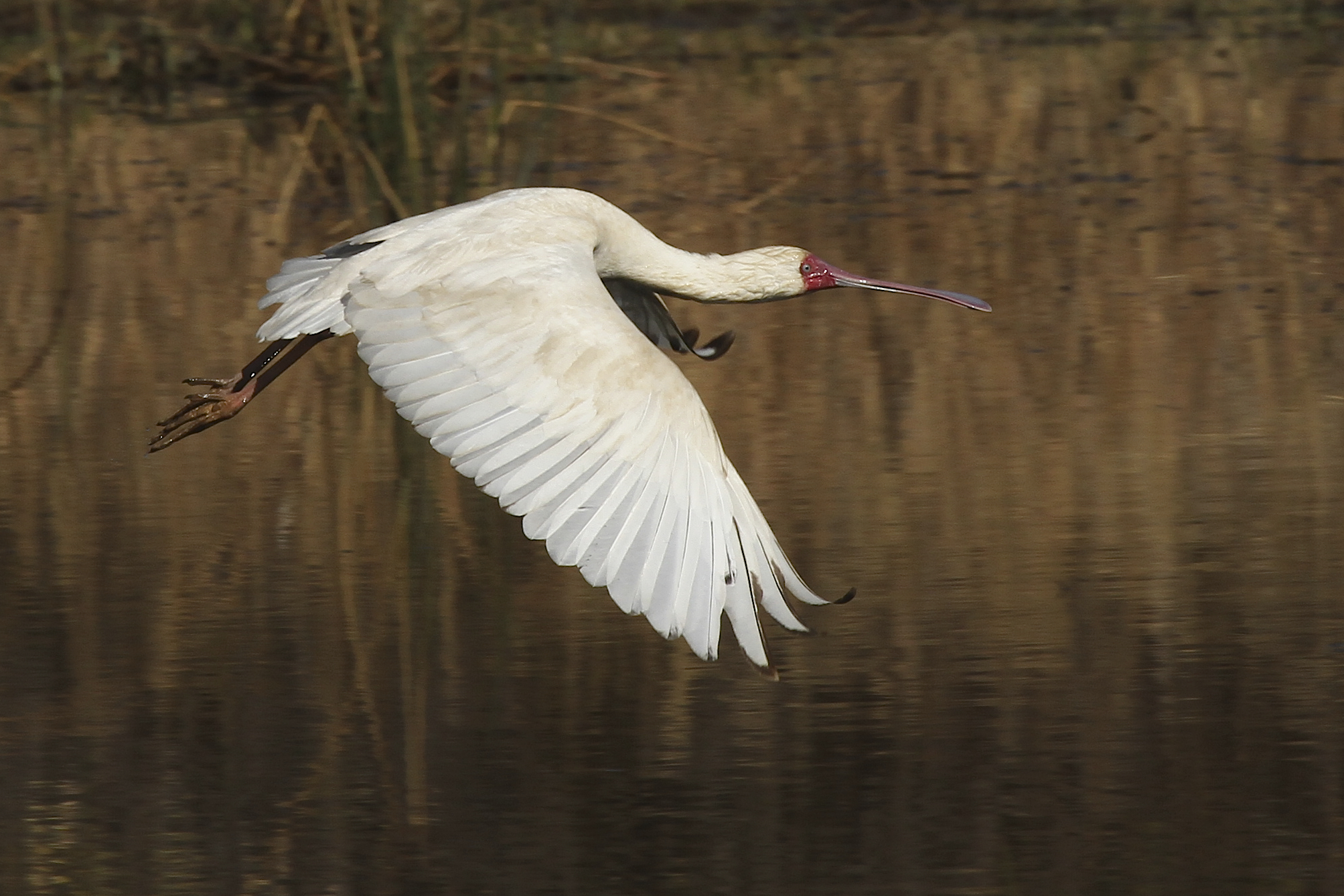
African spoonbill in flight

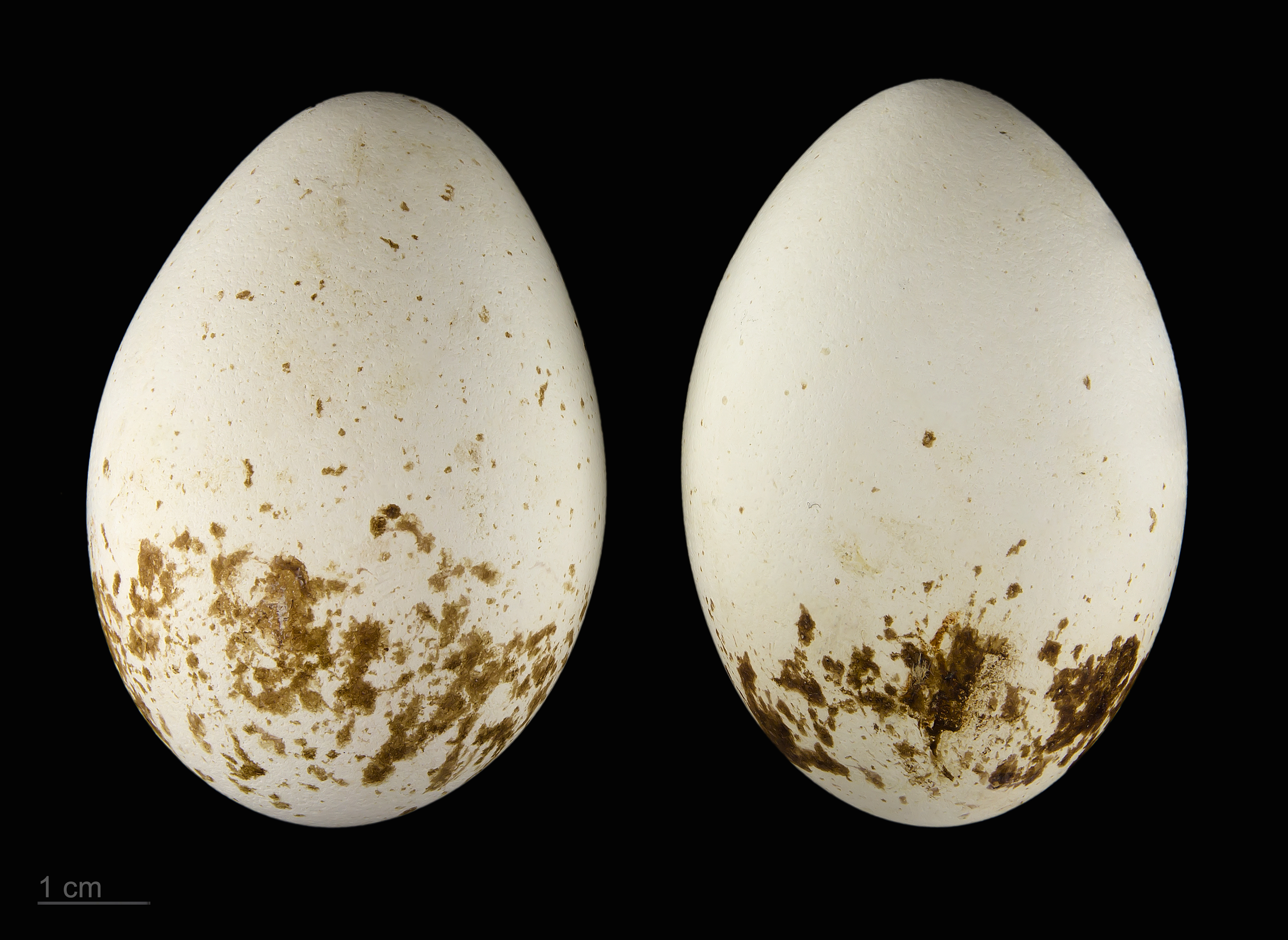
Platalea alba - MHNT

The African spoonbill begins breeding in the winter, which lasts until spring. During the breeding season, adult male African Spoonbills develop more plumage and brighter coloration. The spoonbill's nest, generally located in trees above water, is built from sticks and reeds and lined with leaves. Three to five eggs are laid by the female birds, usually during the months of April or May. The eggs are incubated by both parents for up to 29 days, and upon hatching the young birds are cared for by both parents for around 20 to 30 days. The birds are ready to leave the nest soon afterward, and begin flying after another four weeks.

The African spoonbill is one of the species to which the Agreement on the Conservation of African-Eurasian Migratory Waterbirds (AEWA) applies.
