= Scelotes bipes =

Conservation status
- Least Concern (IUCN 3.1)

Scientific classification
- Kingdom: Animalia
- Phylum: Chordata
- Class: Reptilia
- Order: Squamata
- Suborder: Scinciformata
- Infraorder: Scincomorpha
- Family: Scincidae
- Genus: Scelotes
- Species: S. bipes

Binomial name
- Scelotes bipes (Linnaeus, 1766)

Species of reptile

Scelotes bipes, the silvery dwarf burrowing skink or common burrowing skink, is a species of lizard which is endemic to South Africa.
