= Acontias meleagris =

- Rosebank, Cape Town (2025)

Conservation status
- Least Concern (IUCN 3.1)

Scientific classification
- Kingdom: Animalia
- Phylum: Chordata
- Class: Reptilia
- Order: Squamata
- Family: Scincidae
- Genus: Acontias
- Species: A. meleagris

Binomial name
- Acontias meleagris (Linnaeus, 1758)

Species of lizard

Acontias meleagris, or the Cape legless skink, is a species of skink found in the southern Cape of South Africa. It has no limbs, like most members of the subfamily Acontinae.

== Description ==
Its slender, tube-shaped body is golden-brown with tiny black spots. These spots fuse into longitudinal stripes in some specimens.

== Distribution ==
Found in the southern Cape of South Africa, It is usually found burrowing in dry sand as well as beneath boulders, dead trees and other detritus. It gives birth to two to four young in summer.
