= Vaiani =

Vaiani is a surname. Notable people with the surname include:

- Alessandro Vaiani, Italian painter
- Alexis Vaiani (born 1998), Argentine footballer
- Anna Maria Vaiani (died c. 1655), Italian engraver
- Mario Vaiani-Lisi (born 1950), Italian male long-distance runner
