= Anna Maria Vaiani =

Italian engraver

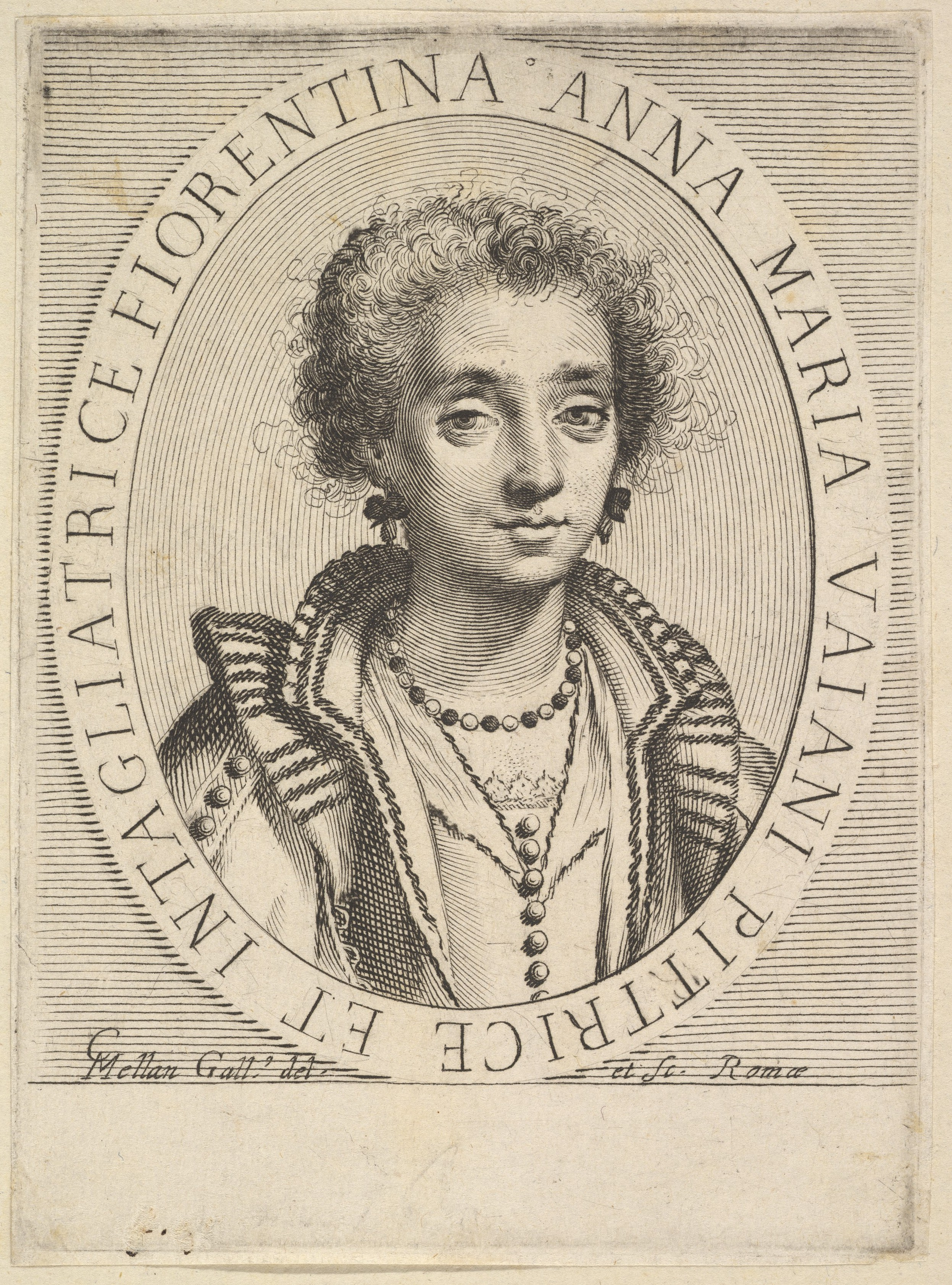
- Portrait of Anna Maria Vaiani by Claude Mellan
- Born: 1604; Florence, Kingdom of Italy
- Died: ca. 1655
- Known for: Engraving and Painting
- Spouse: Jacques Courtois

Anna Maria Vaiani (or Anna Maria Vaiana) (died c. 1655) was an Italian engraver, who was most known for her botanical engravings and designs.

== Biography ==
Anna Maria Vaiani was born in Florence in 1604. Her father, Alessandro Vaiani, was a painter. She lived and worked in Rome. In 1647 she married the French painter and printmaker Jacques Courtois, but it was not a success. The annulment of her marriage was granted due to her strong connections to Pope Urban VIII.

Anna Maria Vaiani was widely known during her time. She was affiliated with the painters and miniaturist guild Accademia di San Luca and the scientific guild Accademia dei Lincei. Women were uncommon to be part of academies during this period. Vaiani worked alongside and collaborated with many artists, such as Virginia da Vezzo, who was also a part of the Academia di San Luca.

== Patrons & Peers ==
Vaiani exchanged letters with Galileo Galilei from 1630 to 1638. She acquired Cardinal Francesco Barberini as her patron through Galileo's influence. The Barberini family supported Vaiani throughout her career as patrons and associates.

Vaiani worked alongside and collaborated with many artists throughout her many projects. Some included:

- Johann Friedrich Greuter
- Andrea Sacchi
- Guido Reni
- Pietro da Cortona
- Claude Mellan

== Works ==
Vaiani began her art career painting as her father's assistant. She worked in fresco and oil and completed many of her father's works after he died. Her first recorded work was the completion of one of her father's paintings in the Pope's Capella Segreta in Rome. Other collaborative fresco pieces include the Agony in the Garden, the Flagellation, the Crowning with Thorns, and the Road to the Calvary. Many of her paintings were commissioned by the Barberini family. Some decorated the chapel of Urban VIII in the Vatican and various other chapels. One of Vaiani's most famous paintings was the Madonna and Christ Child with John the Baptist and Cherubs.

Though Vaiani began with painting, she is most well known for her engravings, specifically her botanical engravings. She contributed to documentary engraving collections such as the De Florum Cultura and the Galleria Giustiniani. She also created individual works such as The Magdalen in Half-Length, which is currently at the British Museum.

=== De Florum Cultura ===
Vaiani was one of the artists who contributed copper-plate etchings in 1633 to illustrate Giovanni Battista Ferrari's De Florum Cultura, which was based on Barberini's botanical garden. Only one engraving from the book is signed by Vaiani, Bouquet of Flowers. She is credited as one of the designers of the engravings; however, it is speculated that she engraved many of the others. De Florum Cultura can be found in the collection of the Metropolitan Museum of Art, and other institutions.

=== Galleria Giustiniani ===
The Galleria Giustiniani is a catalog of Vincenzo Giustiniani's collection of ancient Roman statues made in 1631 under the direction of Joachim von Sandrart. Vaiani engraved three plates for this collection: Two Busts of Women, Two Busts of Old Men, and Statue of Pallas Athena.

== Gallery ==
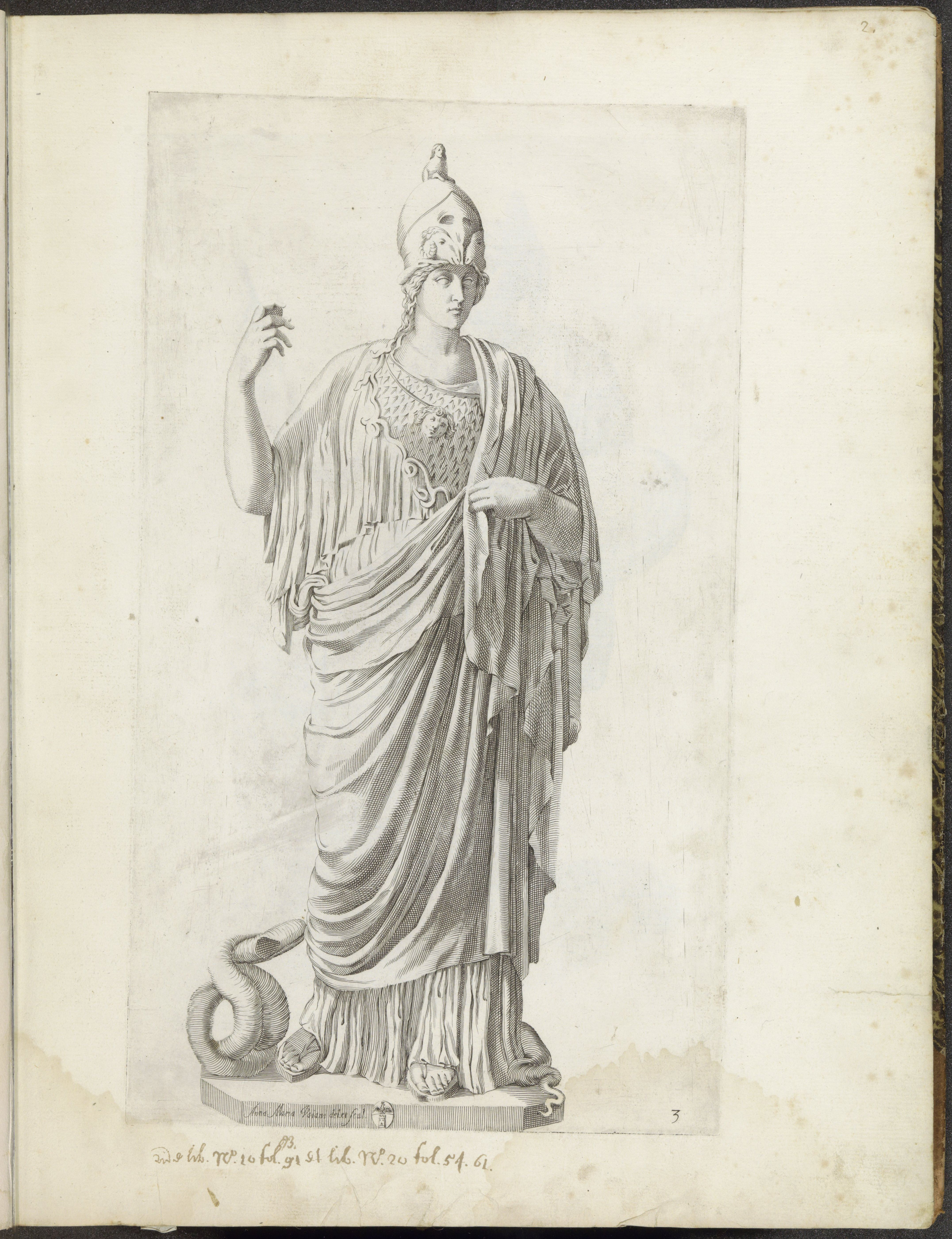
Statue of Pallas Athena, in Galleria Giustiniana, 1631, engraving. The Royal Academy of Arts.

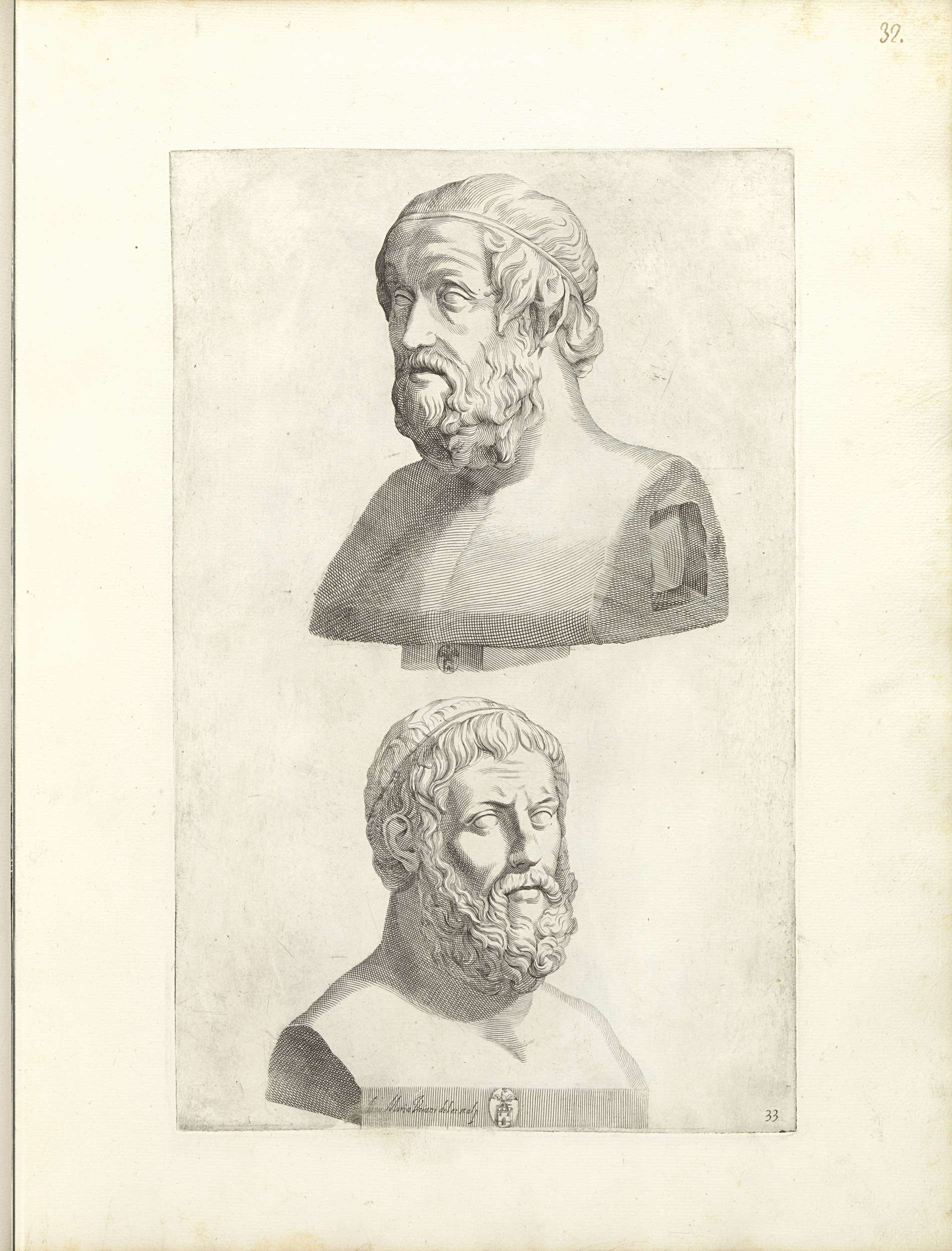
Two Busts of Old Men, in Galleria Giustiniana, 1631, engraving. The Royal Academy of Arts.

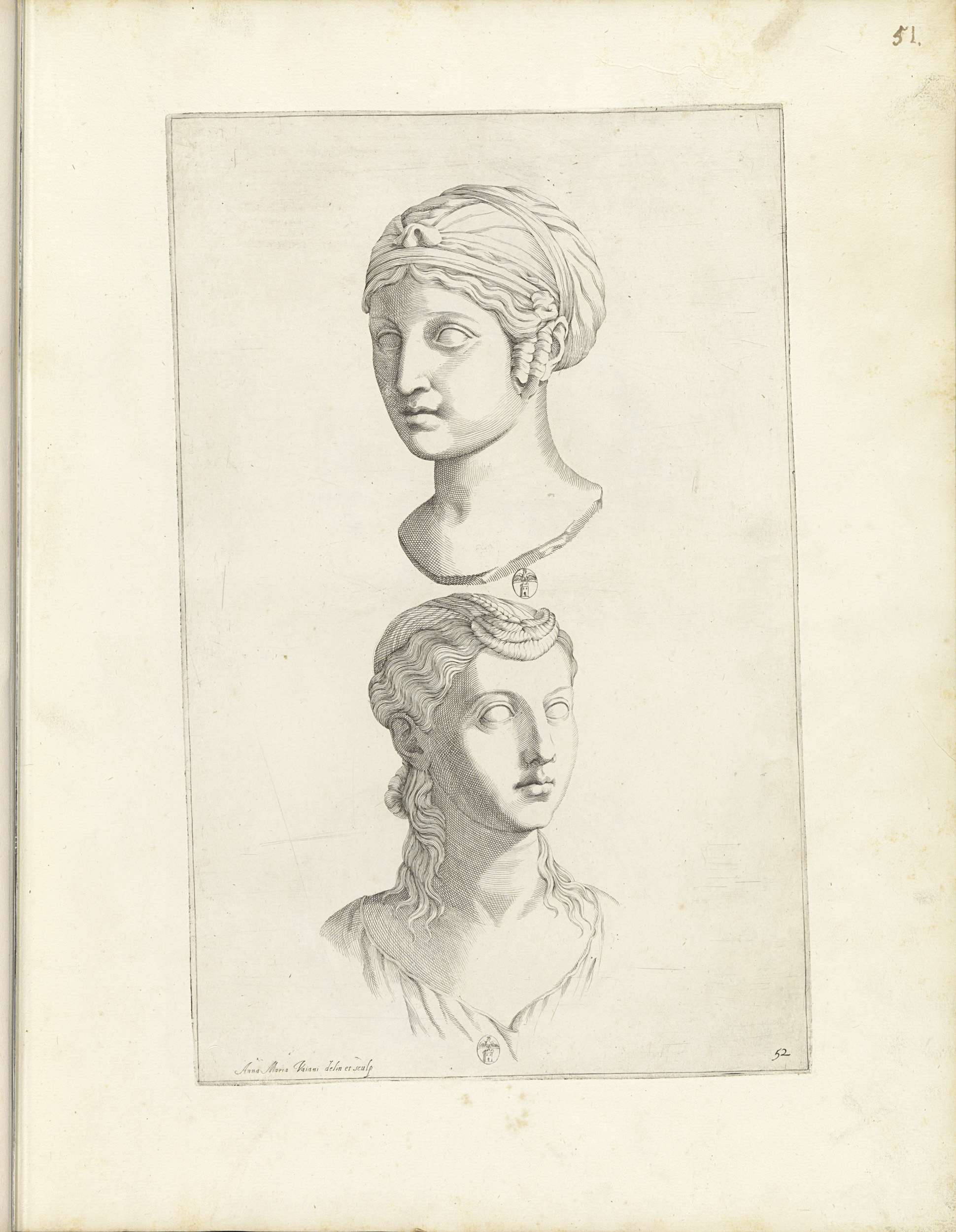
Two Busts of Women, in Galleria Giustiniana, 1631, engraving. The Royal Academy of Arts.

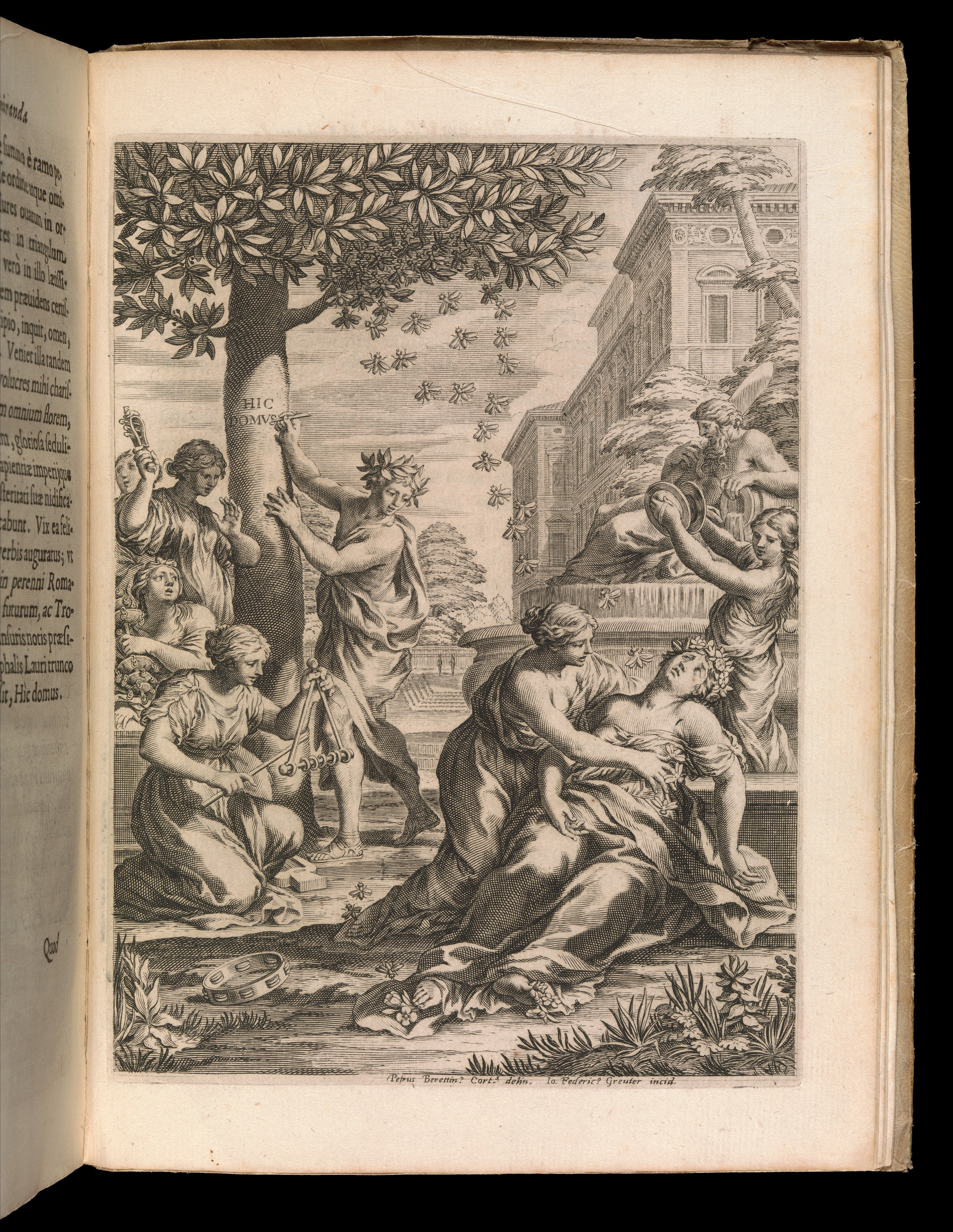
De Florum Cultura, 1633, engraving. The Metropolitan Museum of Art.

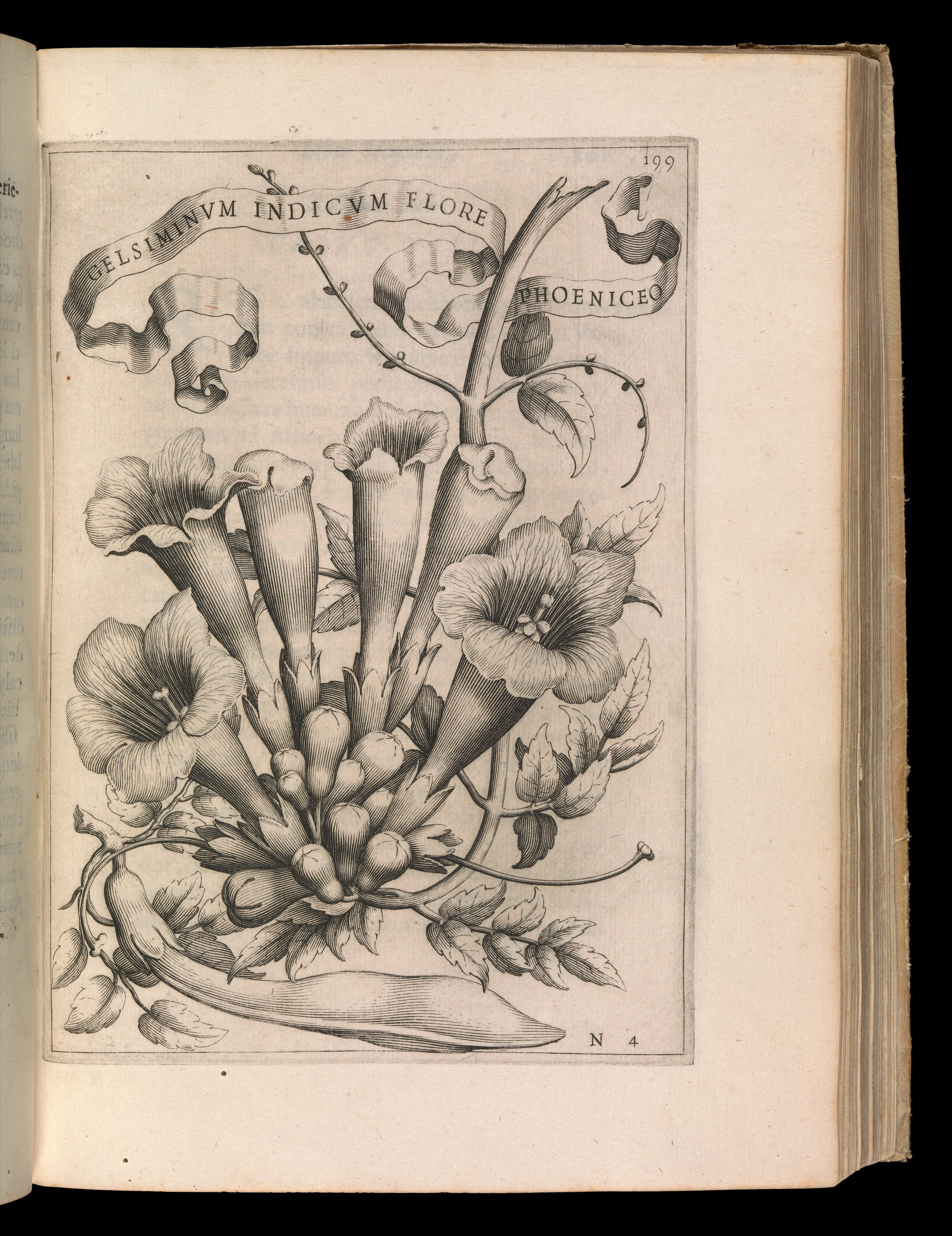
De Florum Cultura, 1633, engraving. The Metropolitan Museum of Art.

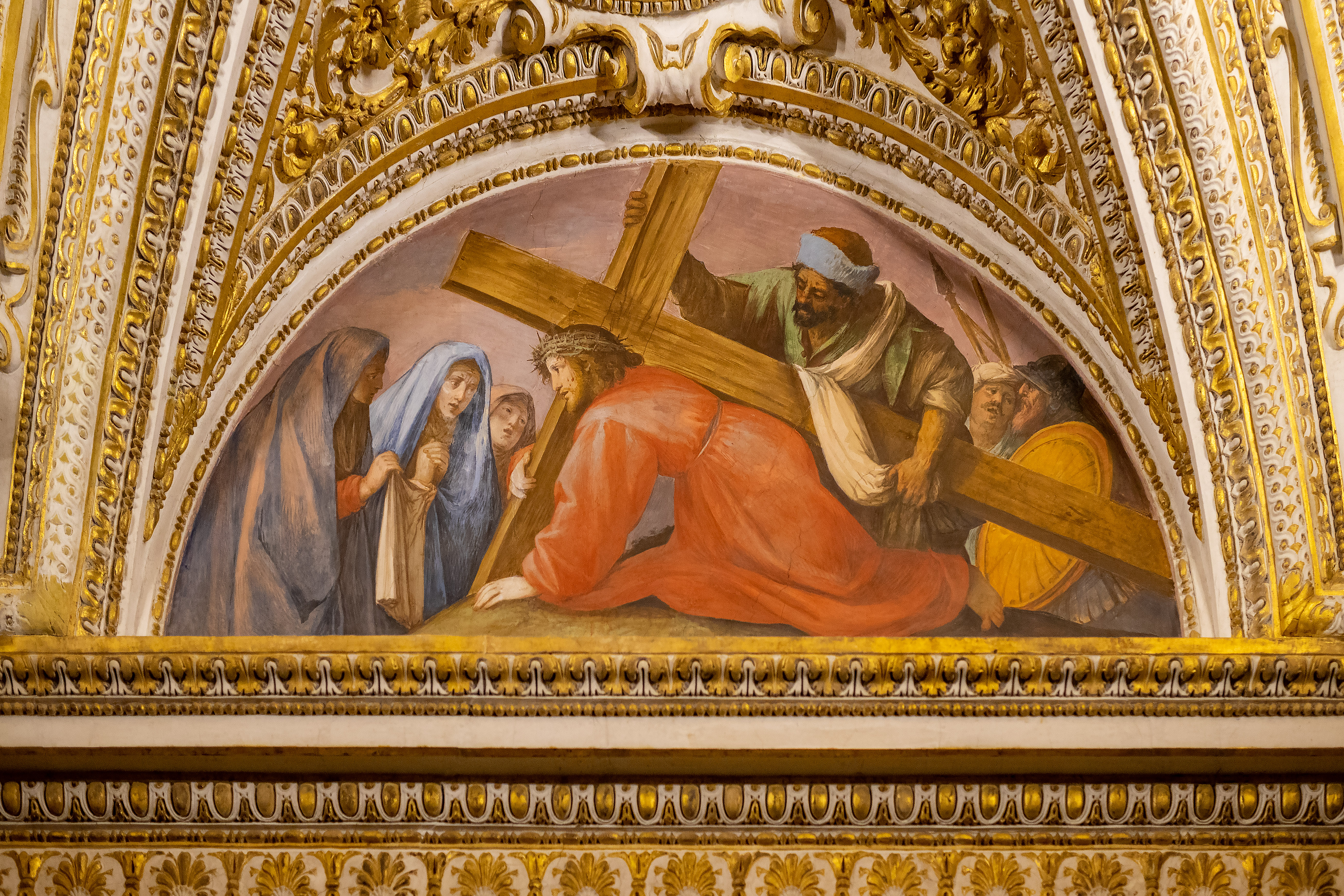
Alessandro and Anna Maria Vaiani, Stories from the Passion of Christ, 1631, Chapel of Urban VIII, Rome, Vatican City.

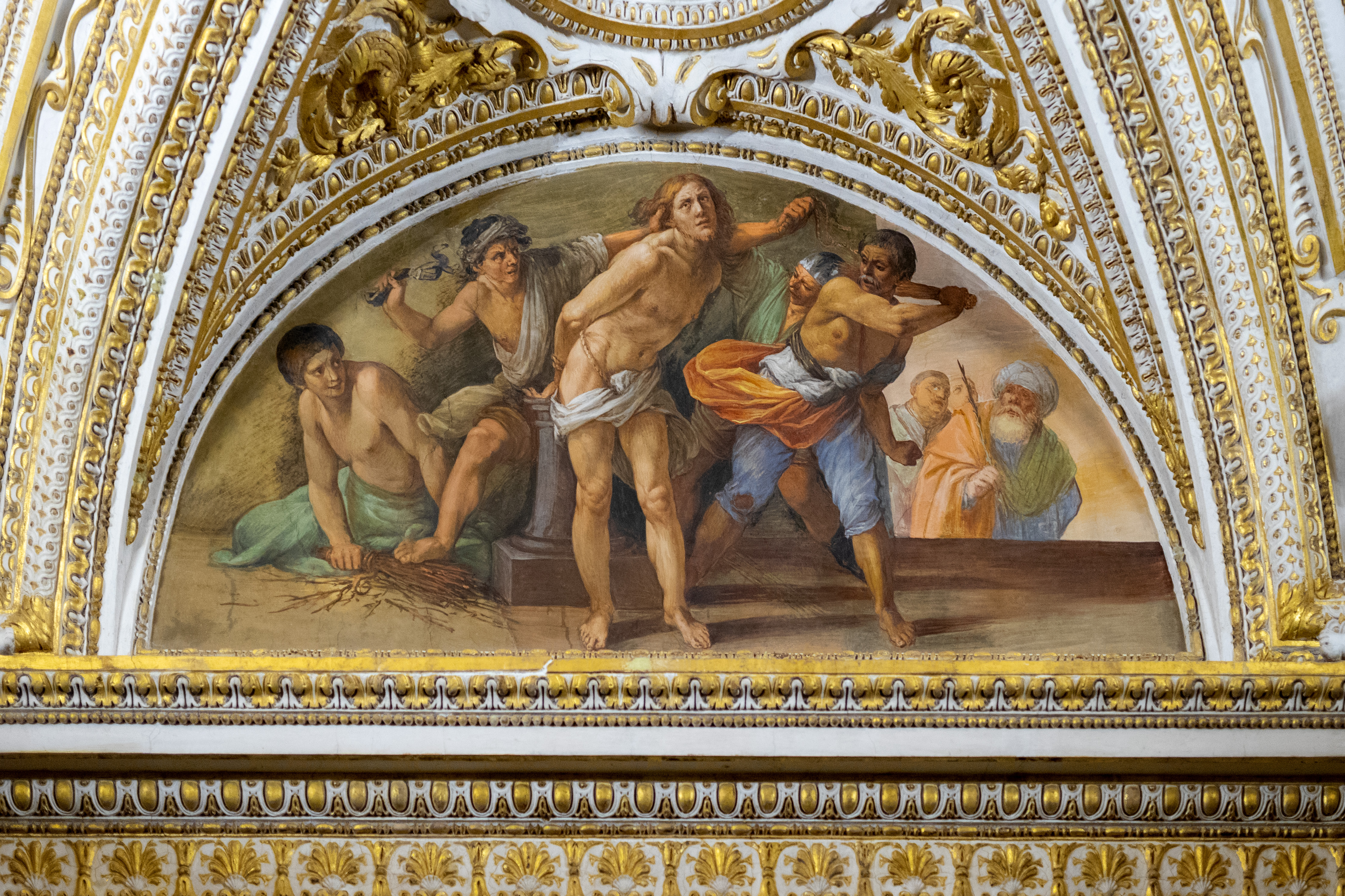
Alessandro and Anna Maria Vaiani, Stories from the Passion of Christ, 1631, Chapel of Urban VIII, Rome, Vatican City.

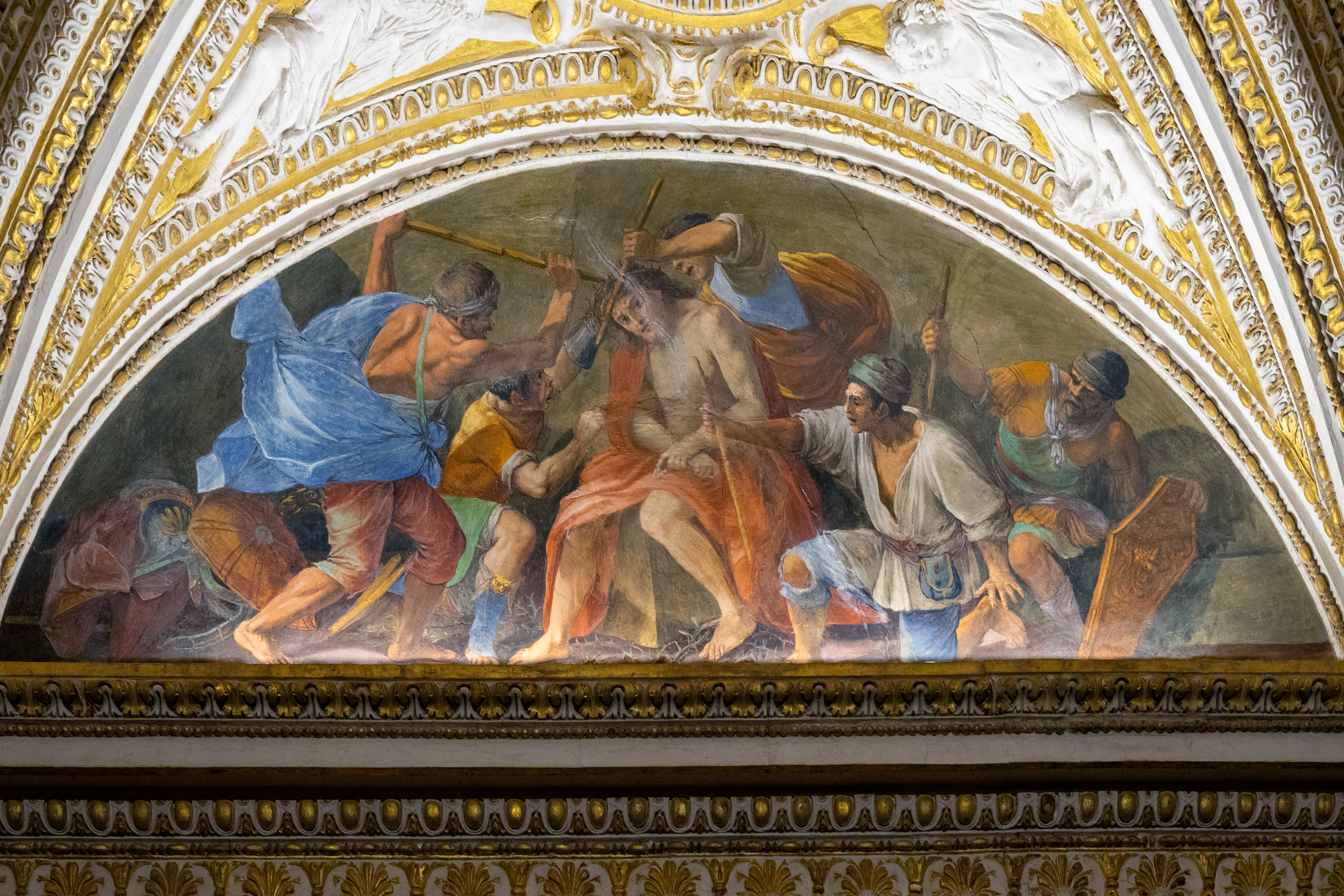
Alessandro and Anna Maria Vaiani, Stories from the Passion of Christ, 1631, Chapel of Urban VIII, Rome, Vatican City.
