= Jacques Courtois =

Franche-Comtois–Italian painter (1621–1676)

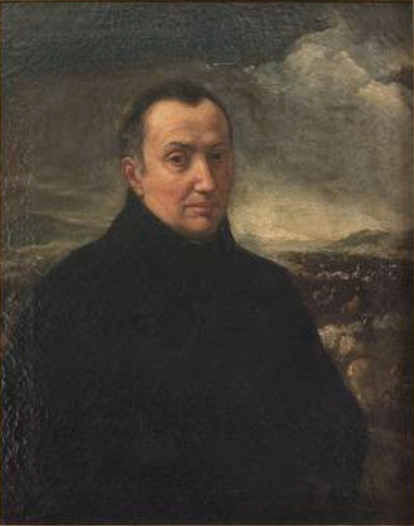
Self-portrait, 1675

Jacques Courtois (French pronunciation: [ʒak kuʁtwa]) or Giacomo Cortese, called il Borgognone or le Bourguignon (12 ?December 1621 – 14 November 1676) was a Franche-Comtois–Italian painter, draughtsman, and etcher. He was mainly active in Rome and Florence and became known as the leading battle painter of his age. He also created history paintings and portraits. He became a Jesuit later in life while continuing to paint.

== Life ==
Jacques Courtois was born in Saint-Hippolyte, near Besançon (Franche-Comté) in present-day France, but at the time, a Spanish possession in Holy Roman Empire. He was the son of the obscure painter Jean-Pierre Courtois. Very little is known about Guillaume’s youth but it is assumed he received his initial training from his father. He had two younger brothers who also became painters Guillaume (Guglielmo Cortese) (1628 - 1679) and Jean-François (c. 1627-?). As his brother was later also known as 'il Borgognone' (a reference to their origins in Burgundy, called Comté de Bourgogne or Franche-Comté in French), some of the works of the brothers have been confused.

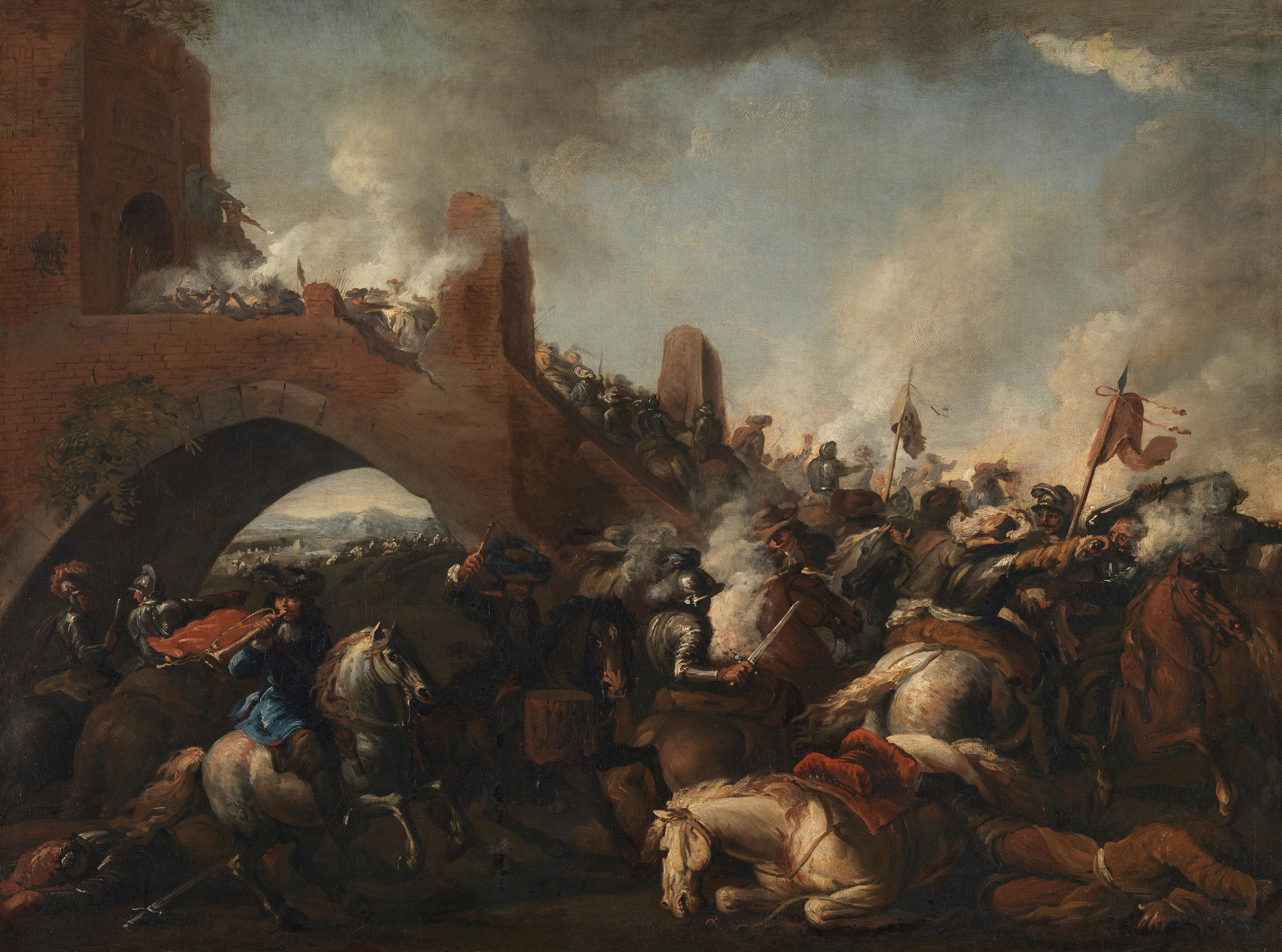
Storming of a castle

The father took his sons to Italy around 1636 when they were still young. They first travelled to Milan. According to contemporary biographers he served for three years in the Spanish army. During this time he drew marches and battles, fight scenes, landscapes and military costumes. After leaving the army, he studied for some time in Milan with an unidentified sculptor. He moved to Bologna in 1639 where he first entered the studio of Jérôme Colomès, a painter from Lorraine. According to early Italian biographer Filippo Baldinucci Courtois' talent got noticed in Bologna by prominent painters Guido Reni and Francesco Albani. He continued his apprenticeship in Siena, where he studied for some time at the school of Astolfo Petrazzi.

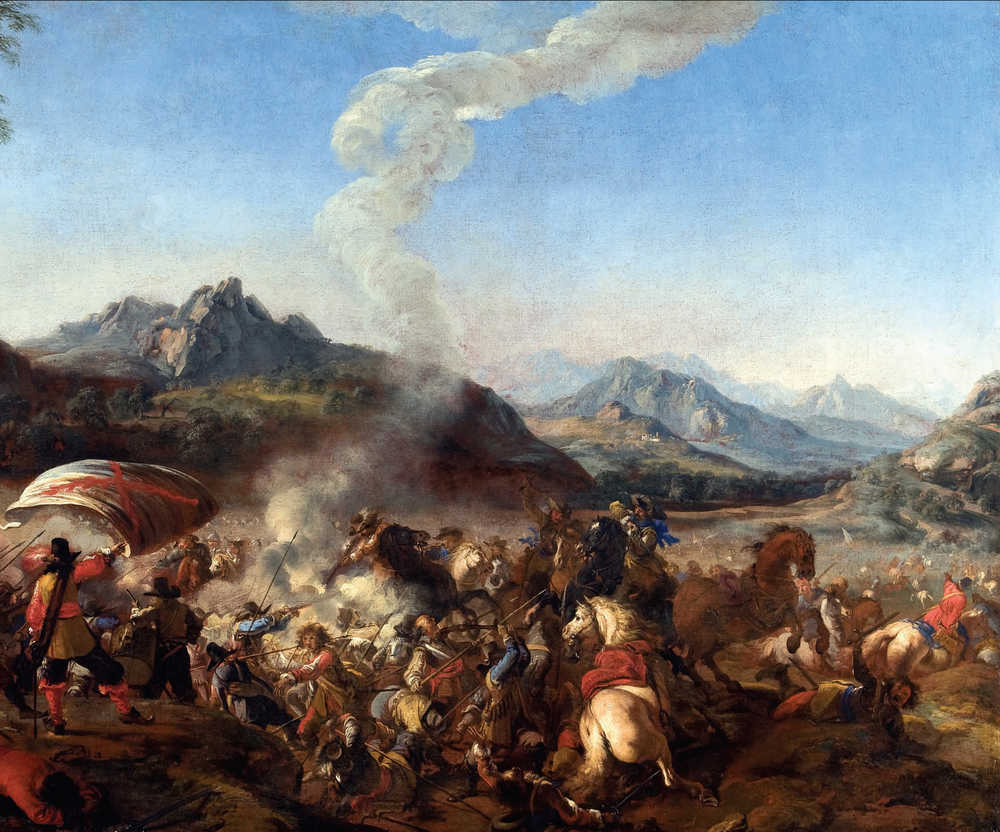
Battle between European troops

It is possible that the brothers Guillaume and Jacques remained together until the late 1640s. He stayed for a short time in Florence where he met two Northern painters Jan Asselijn, a battle painter, and Matthieu van Plattenberg (known as ' Monsù Montagna'), a marine artist.

He went to Rome around 1639-1640 where he initially was permitted to live in the monastery of Santa Croce in Gerusalemme in Milan through the intercession of the abbot Don Ilarione Rancati. The abbot was instrumental in securing Courtois' first official commissions, a large fresco of the miracle of the loaves and fishes in the refectory of the monastery (1641).

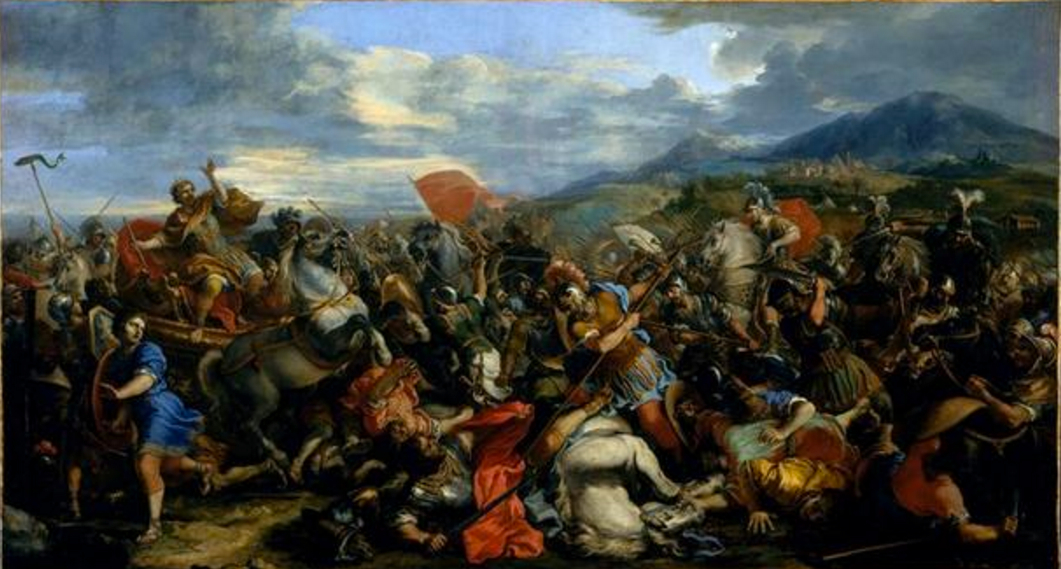
Alexander the Great, victorious over Darius

In Rome he became friends with Pieter van Laer, a Dutch genre painter active in Rome where he was known by the nickname 'Bamboccio'. Pieter van Laer was known for his genre scenes, animal paintings and landscapes, which included anecdotal scenes placed in the environs of Rome. The style of genre painting practiced by Pieter van Laer was followed by other Northern and Italian painters. These followers became known as the Bamboccianti and a painting in this style as a Bambocciata (plural: Bambocciate). Michelangelo Cerquozzi, the leading battle painter in Italy in the first decades of the 17th century who also painted genre paintings in the style of the Bamboccianti, recognized Courtois' talent and encouraged him to paint battle scenes.

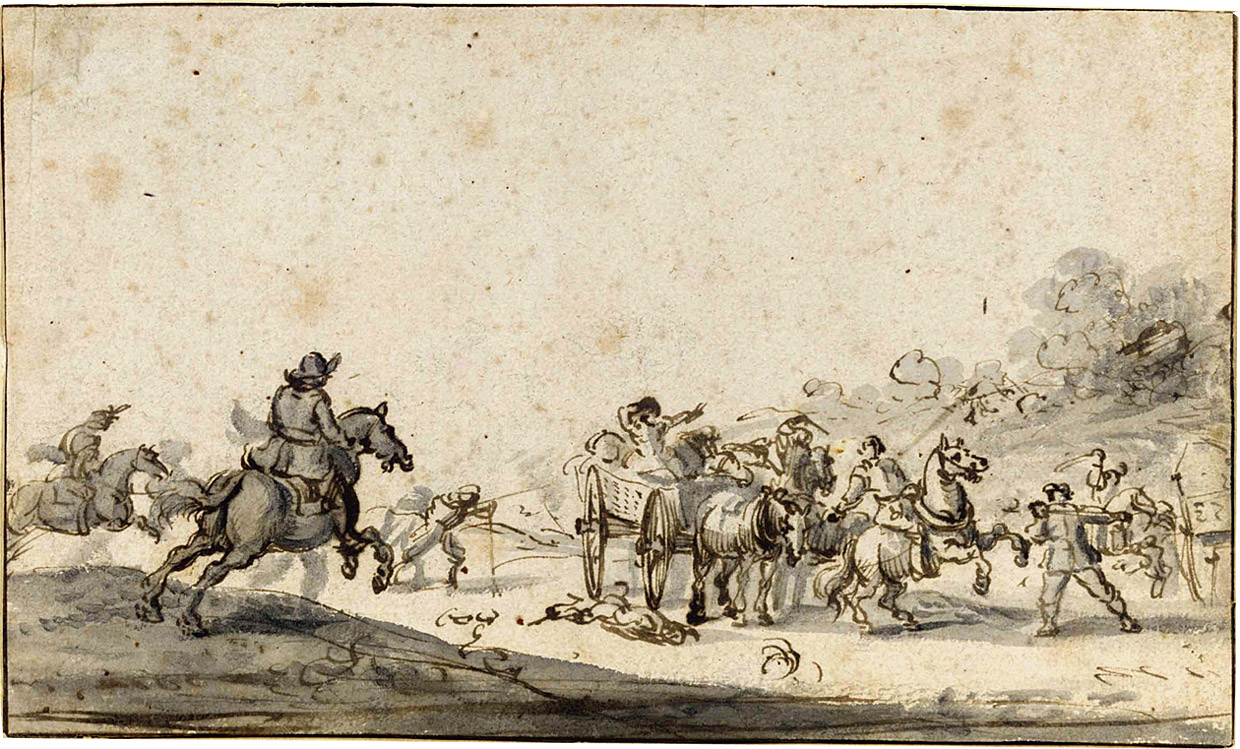
Marauders attacking a group of travellers

During the early and mid-1640s he started to attract the patronage of prominent noble Roman families, among them the Sacchetti, Chigi Family and Pamphili. It was Pietro da Cortona who had introduced him to these noble families. He also worked for patrons outside Rome and abroad in Spain and Italy.

In 1647 Jacques Courtois married in Rome a daughter of the minor Florentine painter Alessandro Vaiani, Anna Maria Vaiani who was a painter and engraver in her own right. His wife was already in her forties when she got married. The marriage was not successful and the couple soon separated for unknown reasons. When Courtois left Rome for Siena she did not follow him. Courtois was called to enter the service of Prince Mattias de' Medici, the then governor of Siena and brother of Ferdinando II de' Medici, Grand Duke of Tuscany. The Prince unsuccessfully tried to reconcile the spouses. The couple did not reunite when Courtois returned to Rome later that year.

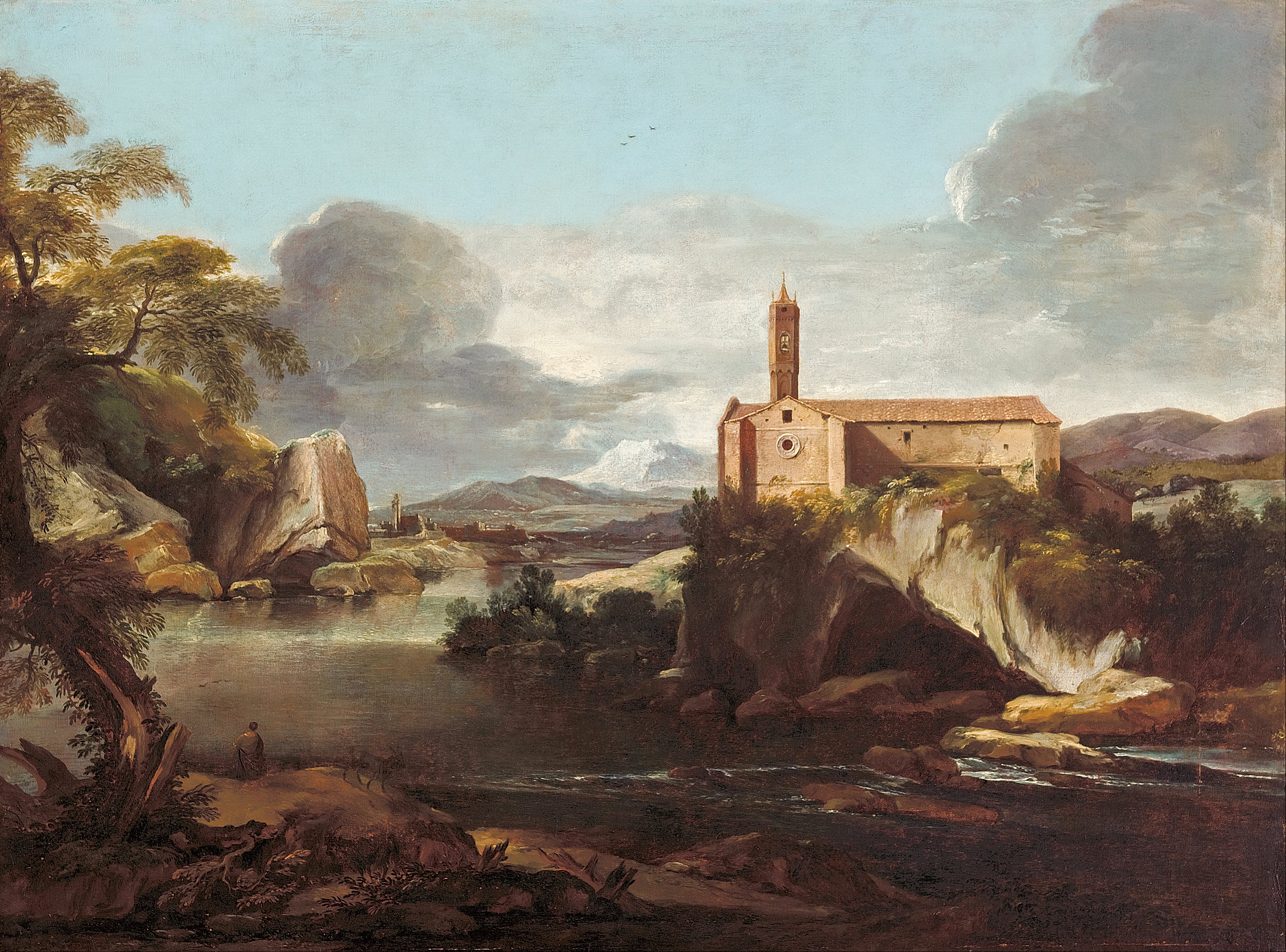
Rocky valley

After the death of his wife in 1654, Jacques Courtois had to deal with the family property and provide dowries for two of his sisters who were Ursuline nuns in Fribourg, Switzerland. He also made some religious pictures for their convent.

He spent time in Bergamo, as is documented by the altarpiece with Madonna and Saints in the parish church of Villa d'Adda, signed and dated 1656. In Bergamo, the artist got to know Count Carlo Giacomo Vecchi, the still-life painter Evaristo Baschenis and art dealer Alberto Vanghetti, for whom he painted numerous paintings and with whom he remained in correspondence until 1657. He then travelled to Venice at the invitation of Nicolò Sagredo, who had been Venice's ambassador to Rome, having already met his brother Guillaume in Rome. Sagredo commissioned Courtois to paint two lunettes above the side doors in the church of St. Mark as well as sacred stories in the gallery.

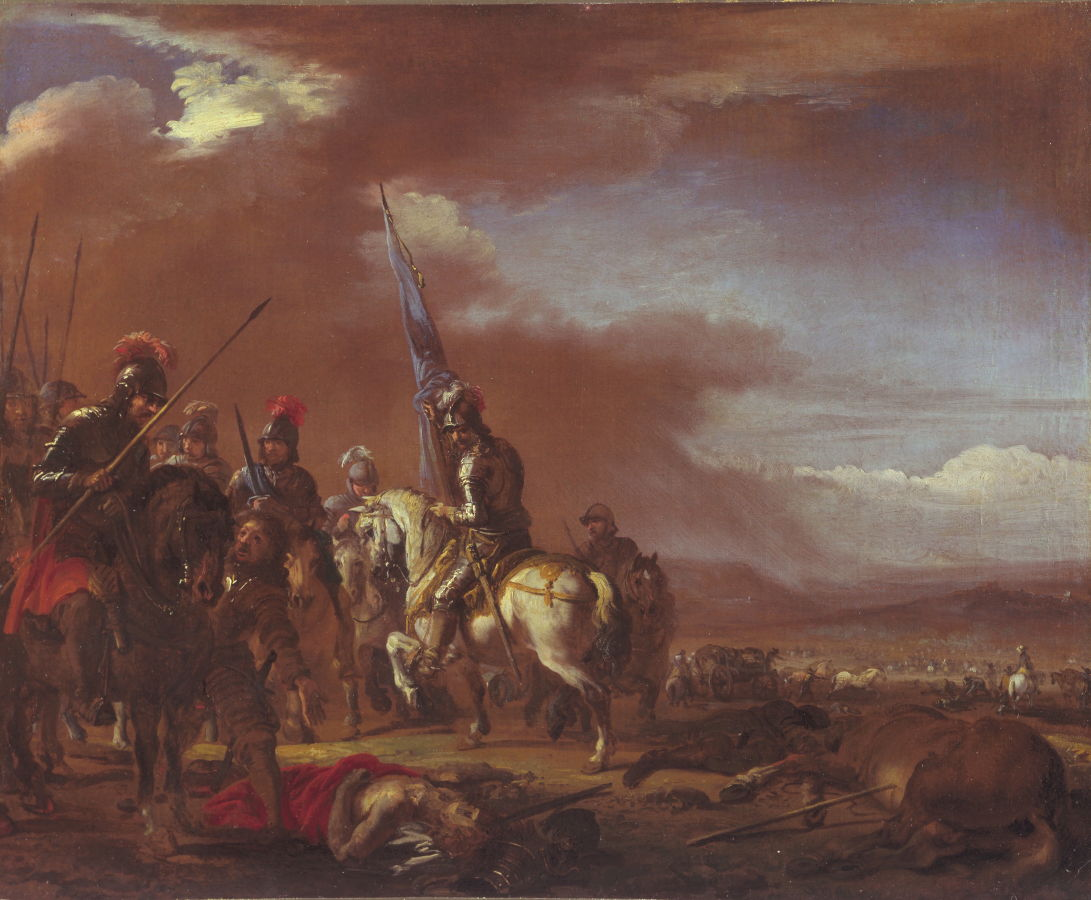
After the Battle

Passing through Padua and Bologna, Courtois returned to Florence in 1656 to work in the service of Prince Mattias de' Medici, who took him back to Siena. In 1657 he returned to Rome where he joined the Jesuit order. After becoming a Jesuit he painted a number of religious compositions but later also returned to his favorite theme of warfare. He started signing his drawings in ink with a cross.

In 1668 he became a priest. He obtained commissions for frescoes in the Church of the Gesù, the mother church of the Jesuits in Rome. He was still at work on this project when he died in Rome on 14 November 1676.

== Work ==
=== General ===
Jacques Courtois is predominantly known for his battle scenes, although he also painted religious scenes as well as idyllic landscapes. In his religious commissions he showed his familiarity with the work of Pietro da Cortona with whom he and his brother had worked. He is also known for a few portraits including one of his patron Prince Mattias de' Medici and a self-portrait.

=== War art ===
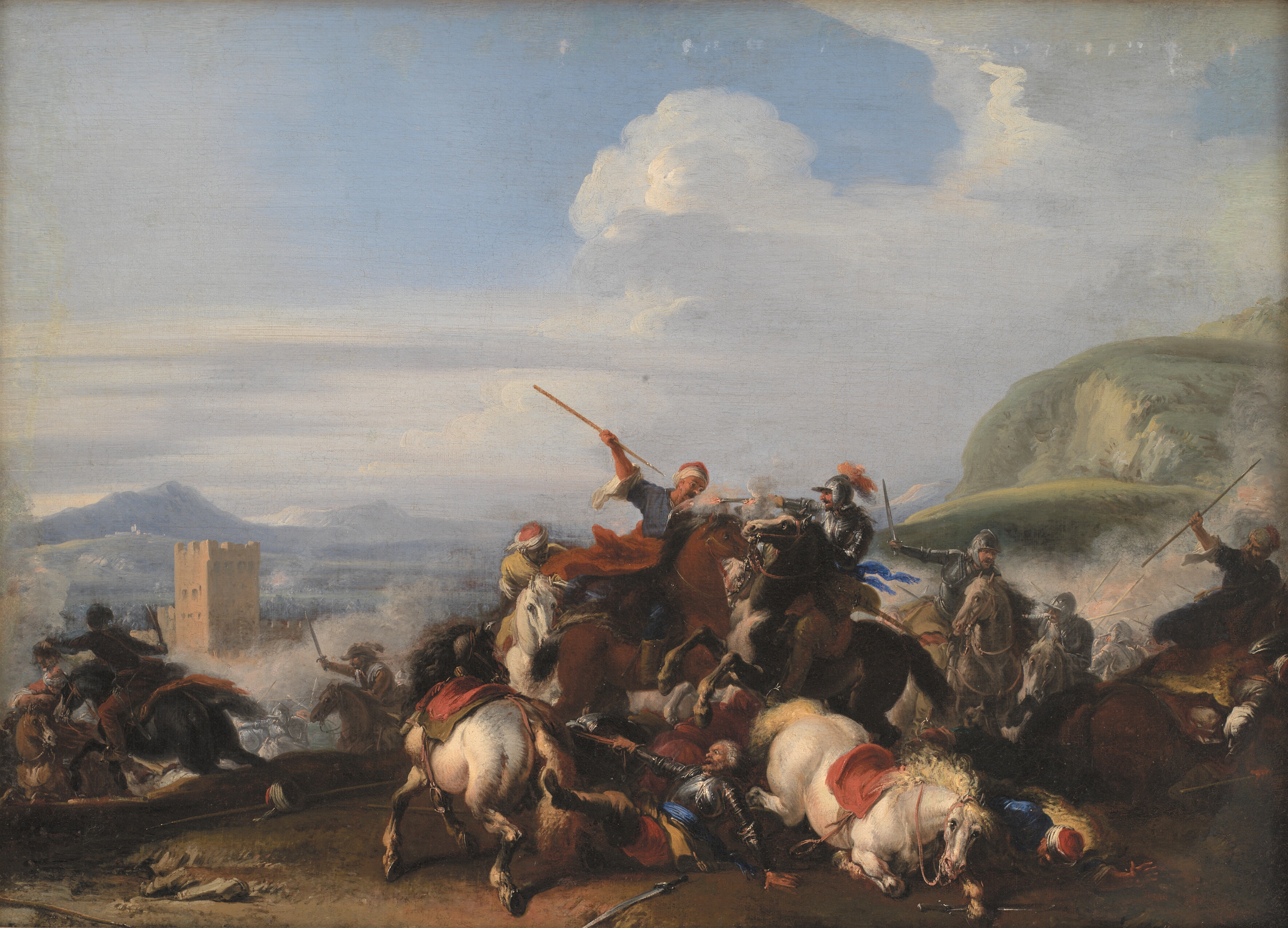
Battle Scene with Turkish Cavalry

Courtois painted imaginary as well historical battles drawn from various episodes of the Thirty Years' War. Draw from his own firsthand experience of wartime facts and techniques, he succeeded in giving his visual representations the impression of 'truthfulness'. Regarded as one of the great battle painters of the 17th century, he was referred to as the 'Raphael of battles' and the 'Prince Eugene of painters'. Prince Eugene was one of the most successful military commanders in modern European history. His paintings of battles were so popular that no large or small collection of his time was without a work by his hand. Courtois succeeded in creating for viewers the impression that they were actually in the thick of the battle.

In Courtois' time people took great pride in the military successes of their armies. Battle paintings were not only intended to celebrate national military victories. They also aimed to allow the viewer to witness the whole range of drama played out in a battle, from the brilliance of individual maneuvers and actions to the bloody consequences to the participants. Courtois relied on all his dramatic skills and compositional devices to create exciting scenes.

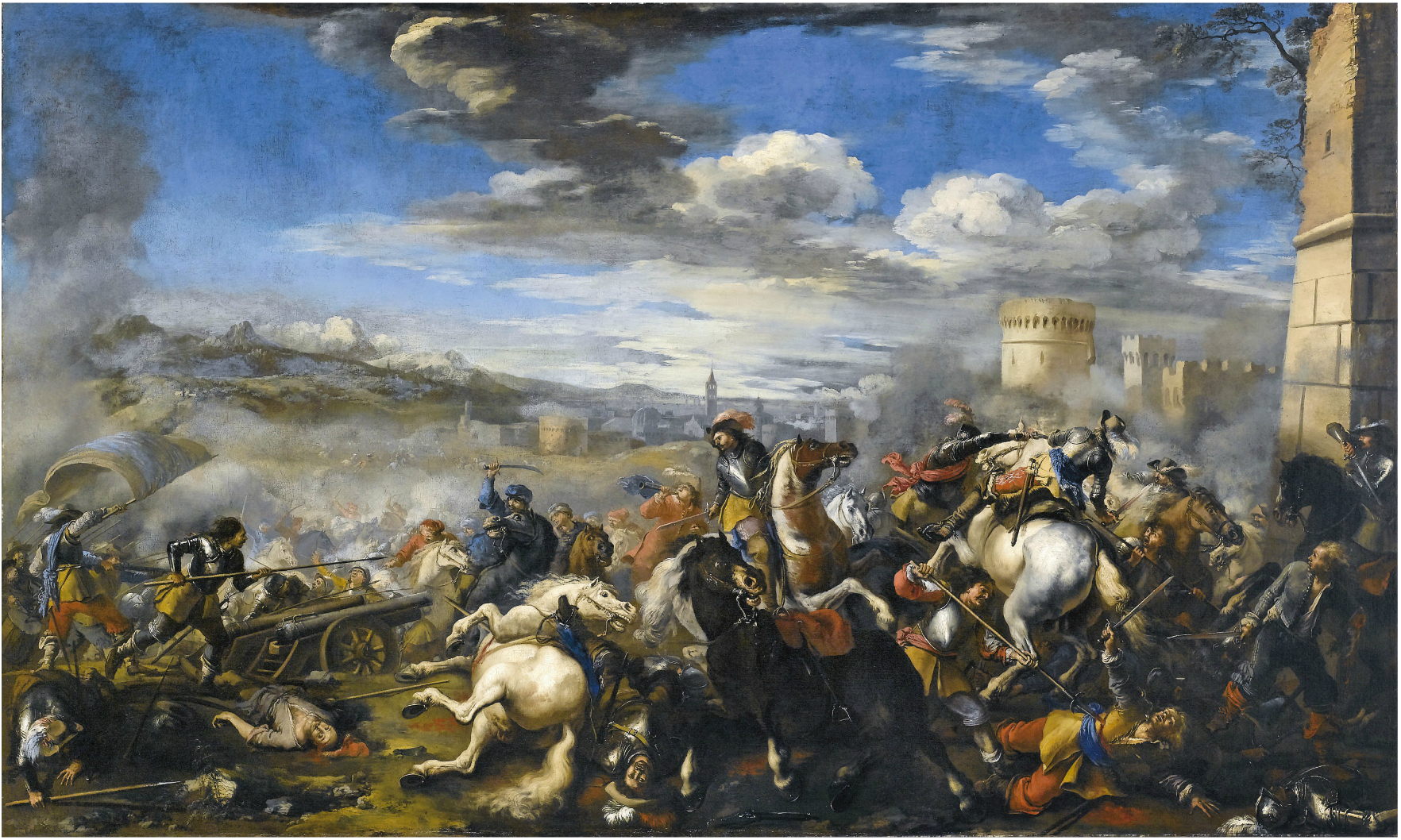
Battle scene with infantry, cavalry and cannon, a fortress and a city beyond

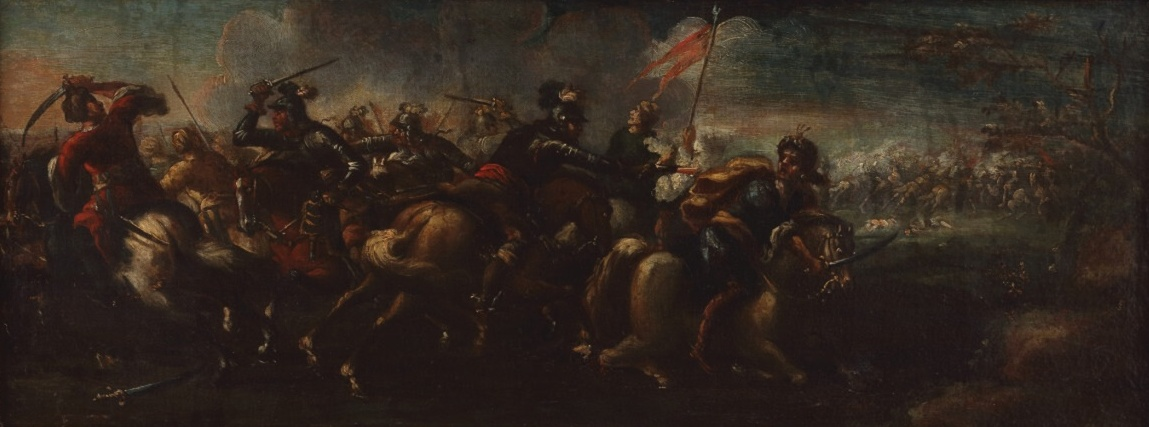
Battle with the Turks

An example of these skills can be seen in the Battle scene with infantry, cavalry and cannon, a fortress and a city beyond (At Christie's on 7 July 2009 in London, lot 27). In this composition Jacques Courtois has created dramatic tension by placing the key dramatic event - the hand to hand combat and tumbling of some soldiers - in the foreground in the left corner. The viewer is thus brought closer to the picture plane and the action developing in the background. The confusion of battle is expressed through the whirlwind of men and horses, which occupy a limited, closed space. The sharply receding cloudscape adds a sense of nobility to the dramatic action depicted below.

Jacques Courtois was known for working alla prima starting from rapid pen sketches. This approach to painting echoed the dynamism of his battle scenes that established his fame.

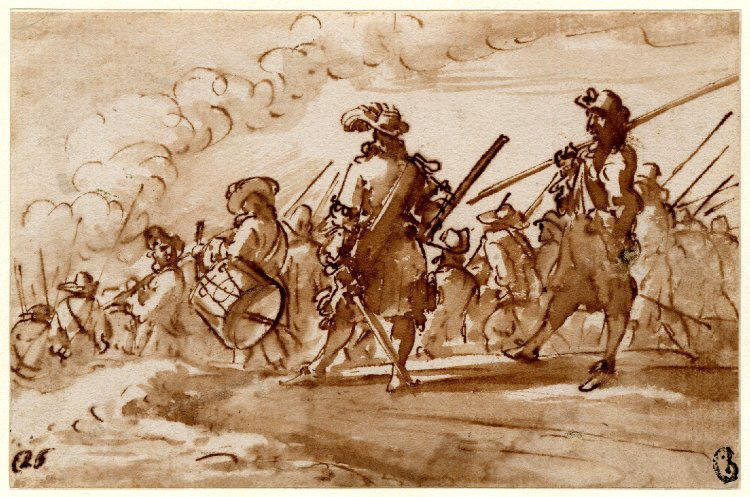
Infantry on the march

The predominant influence on his work was the work of his master Michelangelo Cerquozzi, a painter of battles and genre scenes in the style of the Bamboccianti. Jacques Courtois' battle scenes share with the Bamboccianti an interest in the anecdotal and an attention to detail. This influence became less in his more mature period through the influence of contemporary painter Salvator Rosa whom he had met in Florence, and whose night landscapes, scenes of necromancy, soldiers, battles and genre scenes he admired. The fiery battle scenes of Salvator Rosa possibly left a mark in his more painterly touch and darker colours.

=== Drawings ===
Courtois was also a gifted draftsman who showed in his drawings all the freedom and spontaneity of the Baroque. His sketch-books (London British Museum, and Florence, Gallerie Uffizi) demonstrate his acute ability to capture in quick sketches the movements and the dynamics of troops, while using compositional schemes, which were derived from the work of Jacques Callot. His drawings also show the influence of Stefano Della Bella.

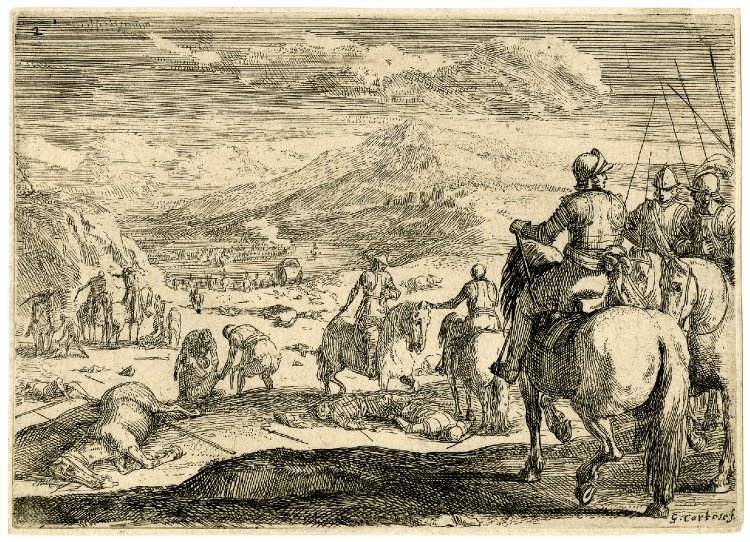
Military scenes, etching

=== Graphic work ===
In 1647 Courtois was one of the artists who contributed illustrations to the second volume of "De Bello Belgico", a work by his fellow Jesuit Famiano Strada. The "De Bello Belgico" offers a history of the Spanish wars in Flanders in the 16th century. Courtois provided four designs, which represent the siege and capture of four cities during the war.

=== Influence ===
The works of Courtois had an important influence on Italian artists, in particular on Francesco Monti (il Brescianino), Francesco Simonini, Ciccio Napoletano and the French artist Joseph Parrocel. The etcher Geronimo Bruni was a pupil of Courtois.
