= Geronimo Bruni =

Italian painter

Geronimo Bruni, an Italian painter and etcher known for battle scenes, was a pupil of Jacques Courtois. He was active at Naples in 1660–70.
