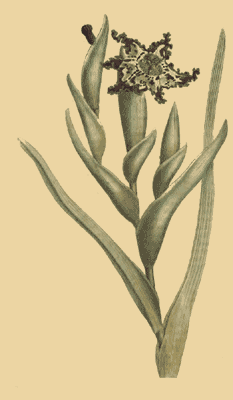
- Ferraria crispa

Scientific classification
- Kingdom: Plantae
- Clade: Embryophytes
- Clade: Tracheophytes
- Clade: Spermatophytes
- Clade: Angiosperms
- Clade: Monocots
- Order: Asparagales
- Family: Iridaceae
- Subfamily: Iridoideae
- Tribe: Irideae
- Genus: Ferraria; Burm. ex Mill.

Type species
- Ferraria crispa Burm.

= Ferraria =

Genus of flowering plants

Ferraria is a genus of monocotyledonous flowering plants in the family Iridaceae, native to tropical and southern Africa. They are herbaceous corm-bearing plants growing to 30–45 cm tall. Some species have an unpleasant scent similar to rotting meat and are pollinated by flies, while others have a pleasant scent. The genus name is a tribute to Italian Jesuit Botanist and botanical artist Giovanni Baptista Ferrari.

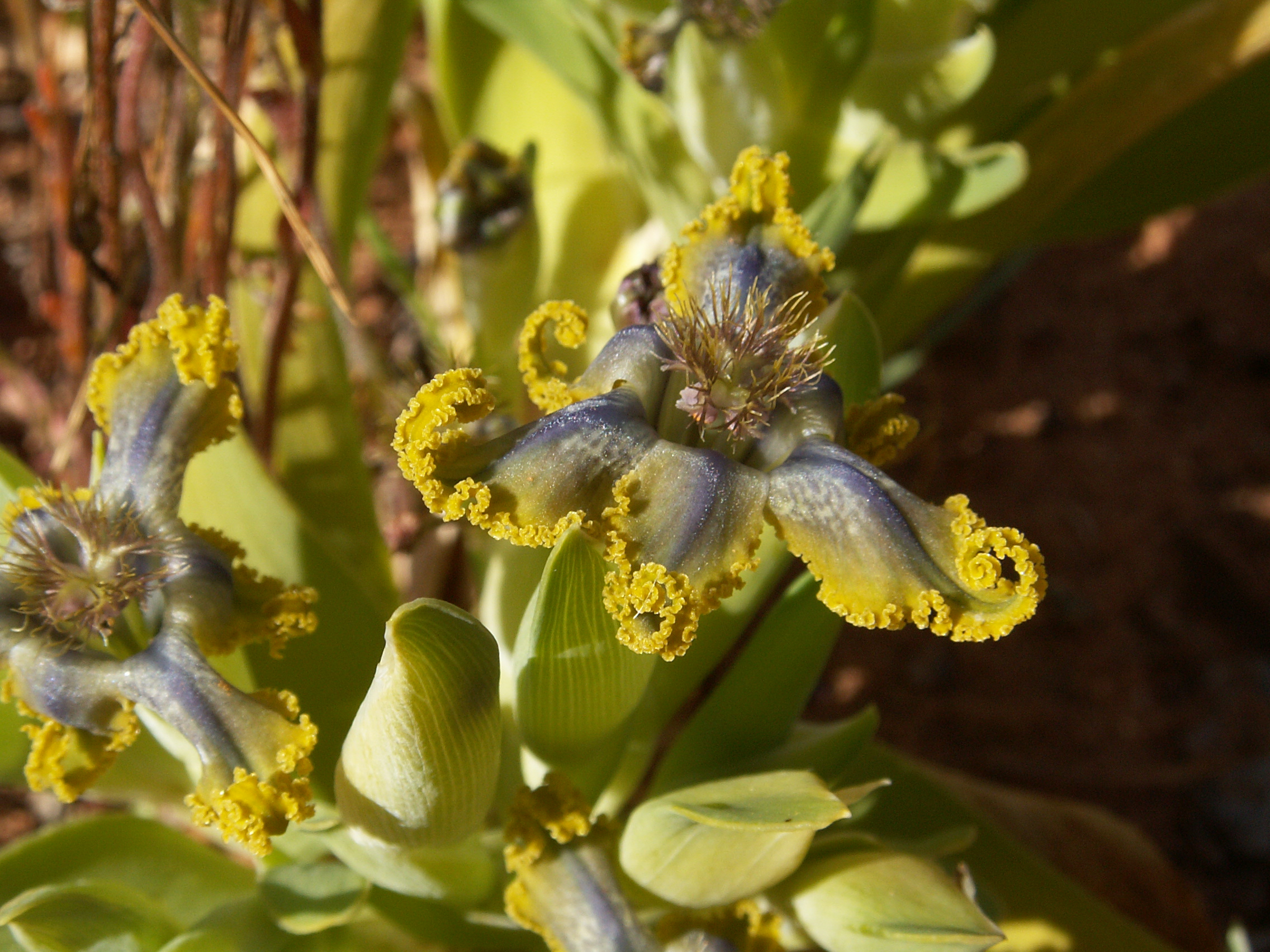
Ferraria uncinata

They are grown as ornamental plants in gardens in subtropical regions.

Species

- Ferraria brevifolia G.J.Lewis - Cape Province of South Africa
- Ferraria candelabrum (Baker) Rendle - Angola, Zambia
- Ferraria crispa Burm. (syn. F. undulata) - Cape Province; naturalized in Spain, Australia, Canary Islands, Madeira
- Ferraria densepunctulata M.P.de Vos - Cape Province
- Ferraria divaricata Sw. - Cape Province
- Ferraria ferrariola (Jacq.) Willd. - Cape Province
- Ferraria flava Goldblatt & J.C.Manning - Cape Province
- Ferraria foliosa G.J.Lewis - Cape Province
- Ferraria glutinosa (Baker) Rendle - from Cape Province north to Zaïre
- Ferraria macrochlamys (Baker) Goldblatt & J.C.Manning - Cape Province
- Ferraria ornata Goldblatt & J.C.Manning - Cape Province
- Ferraria ovata (Thunb.) Goldblatt & J.C.Manning - Cape Province
- Ferraria parva Goldblatt & J.C.Manning - Cape Province
- Ferraria schaeferi Dinter - Cape Province, Namibia
- Ferraria spithamaea (Baker) Goldblatt & J.C.Manning - Angola
- Ferraria uncinata Sweet - Cape Province
- Ferraria variabilis Goldblatt & J.C.Manning - Cape Province, Namibia
- Ferraria welwitschii Baker - Zaïre, Zambia, Zimbabwe, Angola

== Other sources ==
- Biodiversity South Africa: Ferraria
- UNEP-WCMC Species Database: Ferraria
- Germplasm Resources Information Network: ''Ferraria''
- Namibia Biodiversity Database: Ferraria
- Flora of Zimbabwe: Ferraria
