= Guillaume Chasteau =

French engraver

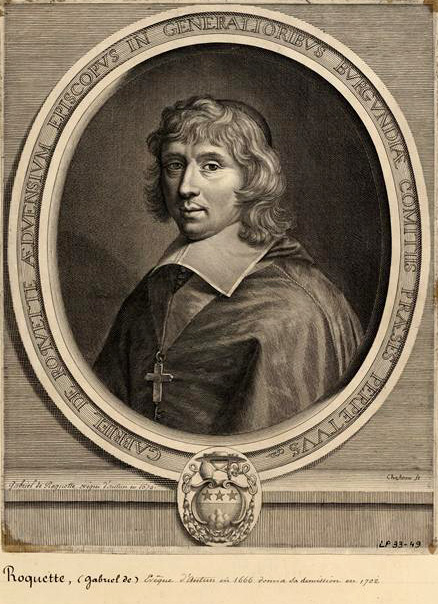

Guillaume Chasteau (1635–1683) was a French engraver.

Chasteau was born in Orléans. He was instructed by Greuter, but afterwards studied under Cornelis Bloemaert and went for further improvement to Italy. After spending several years in Rome, he returned to Paris, where he was employed by Colbert. His first productions were some portraits of the Popes. He afterwards engraved several prints after N. Poussin and some of the Italian painters, some of which are entirely executed with the graver in the style of Poilly and Bloemaert, whilst others are the work of the point, which he handled with spirit and taste. Indeed, it is to be regretted that he did not always follow that style, which is more picturesque and free. The plates which he engraved in Rome are usually marked Gulielm vs. Castellus Gallus. He became an academician in 1663 and died in Paris in 1683. The following are his principal works:

- A set of Portraits of the Popes.
- Portrait of Jean Baptists Colbert; oval.
- Portrait of the Bishop of Ruette.
- The Virgin with the Infant Jesus, embracing a Cross.
- The Life of St. Theresa.
- The Miraculous Draught of Fishes; after Raphael.
- The Baptism of Christ; after Albani.
- St. Paul restored to sight by Ananias; after Pietro da Cortona.
- The Martyrdom of St. Stephen; after Annibale Carracci.
- The Assumption of the Virgin; after the same.
- Christ appearing to St. Peter; after the same.
- The Repose in Egypt; after Correggio.
- The Holy Family, with St. John; after N. Poussin.
- The Israelites gathering Manna in the Wilderness; after the same.
- Christ healing the Blind; after the same
- St. Paul taken up to Heaven; after the same.
- The Preservation of the Young Pyrrhus; after the same.
- Rinaldo and Armida; after the same.
- The Death of Germanicus; after the same.
- The Virgin and Infant Jesus; after Noel Coypel.
- The Holy Family; after the same.
