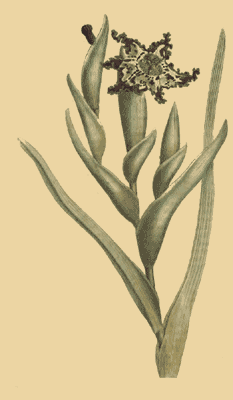

Scientific classification
- Kingdom: Plantae
- Clade: Tracheophytes
- Clade: Angiosperms
- Clade: Monocots
- Order: Asparagales
- Family: Iridaceae
- Genus: Ferraria
- Species: F. crispa

Binomial name
- Ferraria crispa Burm.

= Ferraria crispa =

Species of flowering plant

Ferraria crispa is a species of monocotyledonous flowering plant in the family Iridaceae. It is native to South Africa.

In Australia it is commonly referred to as black flag. It is also known as starfish lily.

== Gallery ==
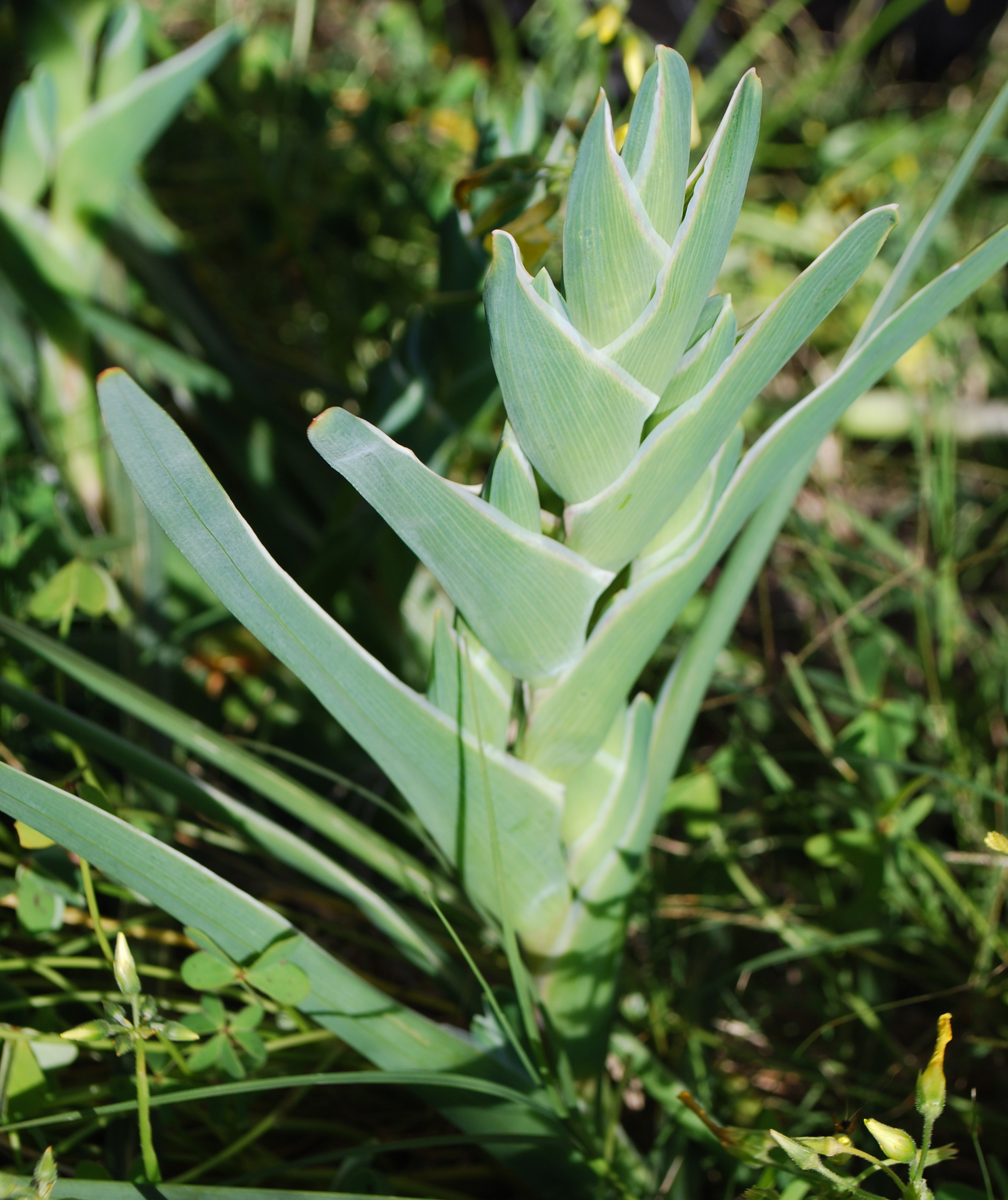
Ferraria crispa foliage

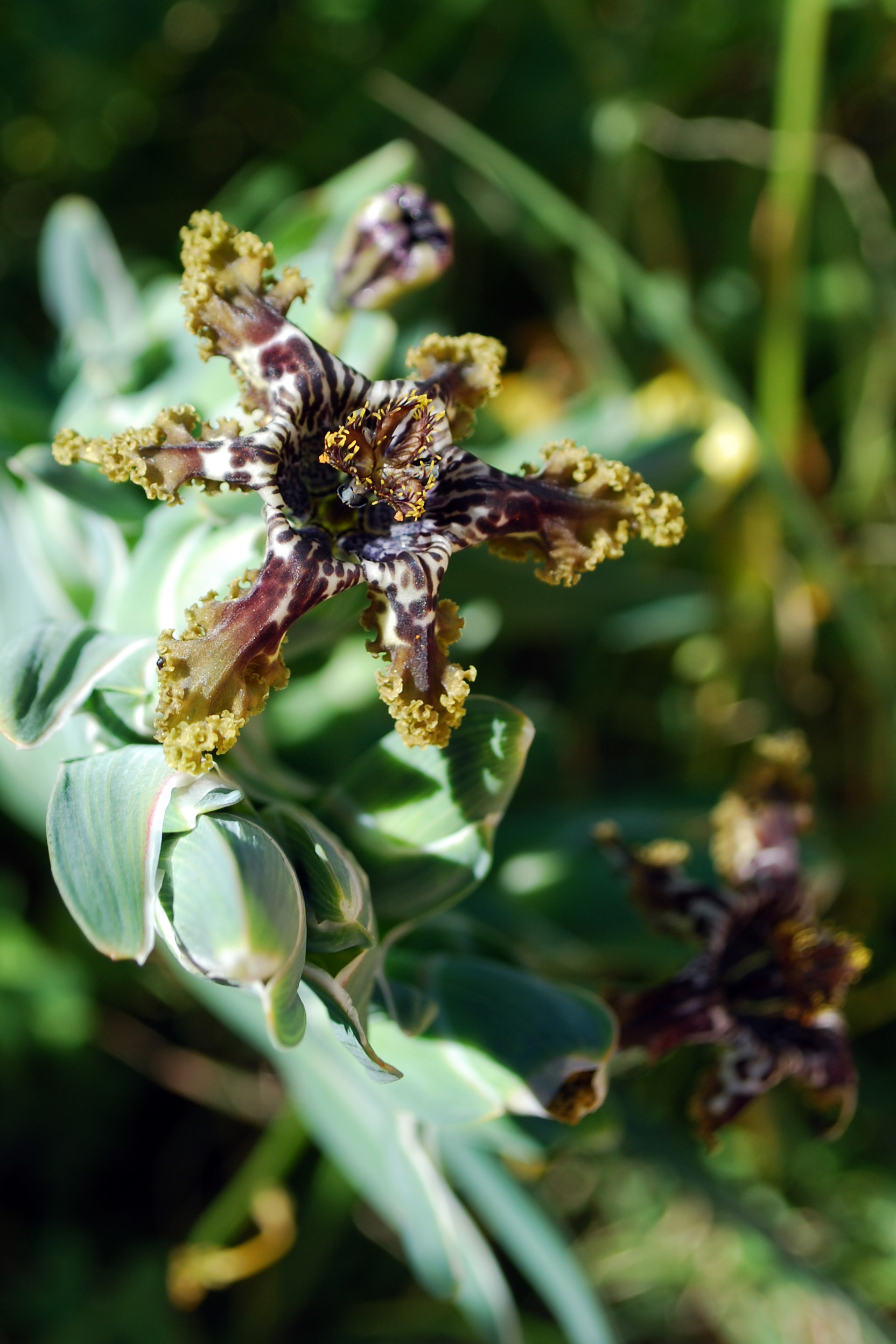
Ferraria crispa flowering
