= Giovanni Baptista Ferrari =

Italian botanist

The Reverend Giovanni Baptista Ferrari
- Born: May 1, 1584; Siena, Grand Duchy of Tuscany
- Died: 1 February 1655 (aged 70); Siena, Grand Duchy of Tuscany
- Occupations: Jesuit priest, orientalist, university teacher, botanist

Academic background
- Education: Roman College; Pontifical Maronite College in Rome
- Influences: Petrus Metoscita; Cassiano dal Pozzo; Federico Cesi; Nicolas-Claude Fabri de Peiresc; Pietro Della Valle

Academic work
- Institutions: Roman College; Maronite College in Rome
- Notable students: Isaac Sciadrensis
- Influenced: Hermann Grube; Philip Miller

Giovanni Baptista (also Battista) Ferrari (1 May 1584 – 1 February 1655) was an Italian Jesuit priest, orientalist, university teacher and botanist. Linguistically highly gifted and an able scientist, he is best known for his Syriac-Latin dictionary, the Nomenclator Syriacus (1622), and his botanical works, the De Florum Cultura (1632) and the Hesperides (1646).

== Biography ==
Giovanni Baptista Ferrari was born to an affluent Sienese family and entered the Jesuit Order in Rome at the age of 19 in April 1602. After studying metaphysics, logic and natural philosophy with Giuseppe Agostini (and after the usual four years of theology), he was sent to the Pontifical Maronite College in Rome in 1615/16 – where he learnt Syriac. The early progress reports at the Collegio Romano are complimentary about his literary and Hebraic talents, but rather critical of what appears to have been his somewhat frail state of health and melancholy character.

By the schoolyear of 1619-20 he was teaching Arabic and Hebrew at the Roman College. His first published work was a Syriac Dictionary, or Nomenclator, which he published in 1622 (but with an approval from Mutio Vitelleschi and Francesco Donati of 1619). The chief object of the author is to explain the Syriac words in the Bible, in which he was assisted by some learned Maronites. Although pretty innovative for its time, Ferrari's Nomenclator was not a very successful effort, and has not enjoyed much esteem in the subsequent literature (Bochart was especially cutting in his judgment). It is, however, interesting for its introduction, with its long list of profuse acknowledgements to various members of the Maronite college, especially Petrus Metoscita, and for its brief insight into the working procedures and resources of a Syriac scholar of those days.

His Orationes, first printed in Lyons in 1625, and several times reprinted, including two London editions in the 1650s and 1660s, are especially remarkable for four very noteworthy orations on the subject of Hebrew language and Hebrew literary style. In the oration on Hebraicae linguae suavitas Ferrari asserts the stylistic capabilities of Hebrew, and defends it against charges that it was limited and coarse; in the chapters Hebraicae Musae sive de Disciplinarum omnium Hebraica origine and Hebraicae litteraturae securitas, sive De arguto dicendi genere usurpando he justifies the difficulties of learning the language, and puts forward the case for studying it. Ferrari's knowledge of the ancient authors, Greek and Latin, was extensive as was his command of the Semitic languages. Indeed, Ferrari was a member of the Papal Commission charged with translating the Bible into Arabic.

== De Florum Cultura ==
Titlepage of Ferrari's De Florum Cultura, Rome, 1633

Ferrari's interests were not limited to Oriental languages. He devoted himself till 1632 to the study and cultivation of ornamental plants, and published De Florum Cultura, which was illustrated with copperplates by, amongst others, Anna Maria Vaiani, possibly the first female copper-engraver. The first book deals with the design and maintenance of the garden and garden equipment. The second book provides descriptions of the different flowers, while the third book deals with the culture of these flowers. The fourth book, continues with a treatise on the use and beauty of the flower species, including their different varieties and mutations.

Through his acquaintance with Cassiano dal Pozzo (1588-1657), secretary of Cardinal Francesco Barberini, he was appointed to manage the new garden at the Barberini Palace. The plants featured in Ferrari's research came from Cardinal Francesco Barberini's private botanical garden, the Horti Barberini, a garden which was under the care of Ferrari.

Ferrari dedicated the Latin edition of De Florum Cultura to Cardinal Francesco Barberini. Ludovico Aureli translated the book into Italian and dedicated this edition, which is entitled Flora, overo Cultura di Fiori (1638) or simply Flora, to Barberini's sister-in-law, Anna Colonna. Ferrari became Horticultural Advisor to the Papal family. Ferrari was also closely associated with the Lincei, and in Book 1, chapter 2 of his Flora, he expressly thanks Federico Cesi for his “erudite additions” (“erudite aggiunte”) and the Accademia for incurring “liberal expenses” (“liberale spesa”) in connection with this book.

== Hesperides sive de Malorum... ==
Hand-colored engraving depicting citrus growing techniques. Illustration from Hesperides by Giovanni Battista Ferrari, 1646

Another important botanical book by Ferrari is the Hesperides sive de Malorum Aureorum Cultura et Usu Libri Quatuor, first published in Rome in 1646. Ferrari's close relationship with dal Pozzo, a noted scholar and scientist, led to the creation of this work. The first volume of this work is devoted to citrus and its many varieties and variations.

The plates were produced by the best artists of the time, such as Johann Friedrich Greuter and Cornelis Bloemaert. Plates were also prepared by the renowned painters and draughtsmen of Roman Baroque, such as Pietro da Cortona, Andrea Sacchi, Nicolas Poussin, Pietro Paolo Ubaldini, François Perrier, Francesco Albani, Filippo Gagliardi, Giovanni Francesco Romanelli, Guido Reni, Domenico Zampieri and H. Rinaldi. The plates show life-sized whole fruit, including sections. Other plates show Hercules, mythological scenes, garden buildings, Orangeries, garden tools, etc.. Ferrari published his Hesperides at a time of growing interest in, and structural sophistication of, seventeenth-century orangeries, needed to protect citrus trees from the cold of Northern Europe and the heat of Italian summers.

Both works are important for their accurate botanical illustrations. Ferrari was the first scientist to provide a complete description of orange, lime, lemon, and their varieties. He also described medical preparations, the details on citron and prescribed limes, lemons and pomegranates as medicinal plants against scurvy. In 1759, botanist Philip Miller published Ferraria, a genus of monocotyledonous flowering plants in the family Iridaceae native to tropical and southern Africa, named in honour of Ferrari.

== Gallery ==
Aurantium corniculatum from Hesperides (1646)

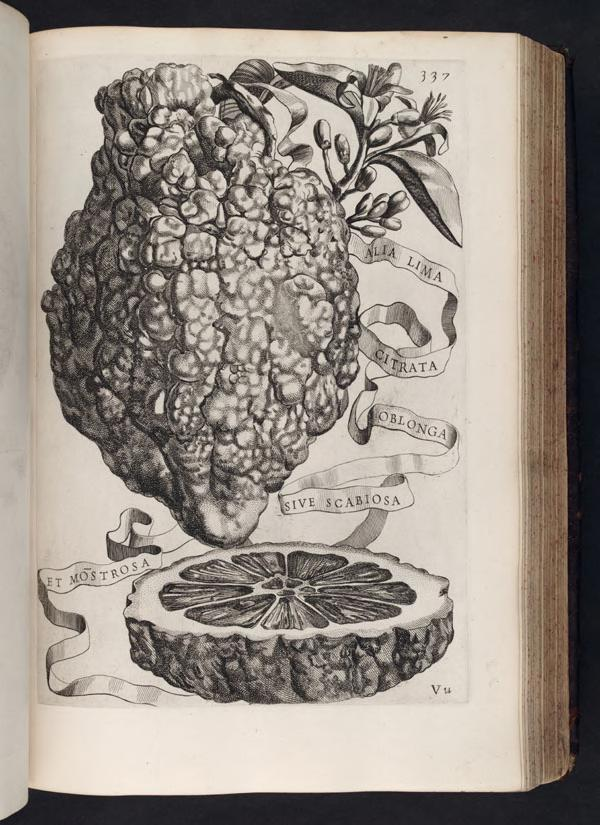
Alla lima citrata oblonga sive scabiosa et mostrosa from Hesperides (1646)

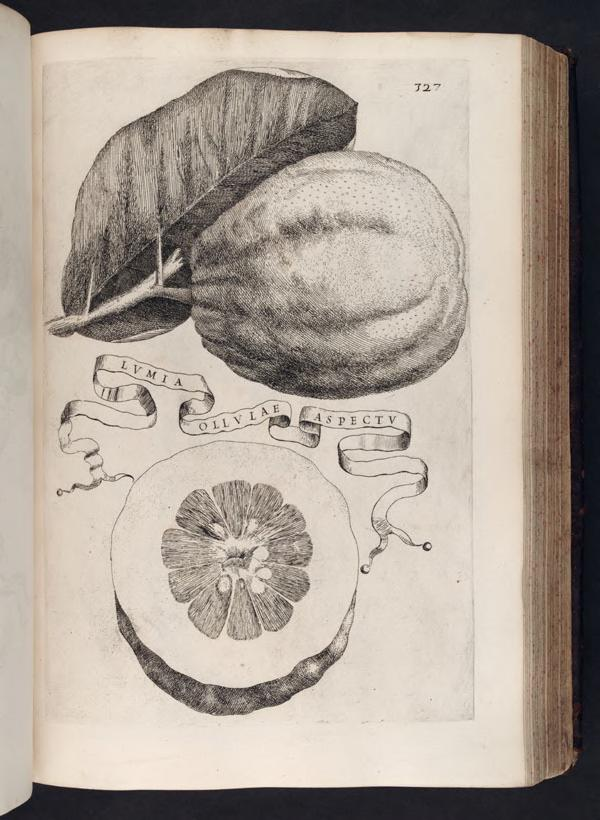
Lumia ollulae aspectu from Hesperides (1646)

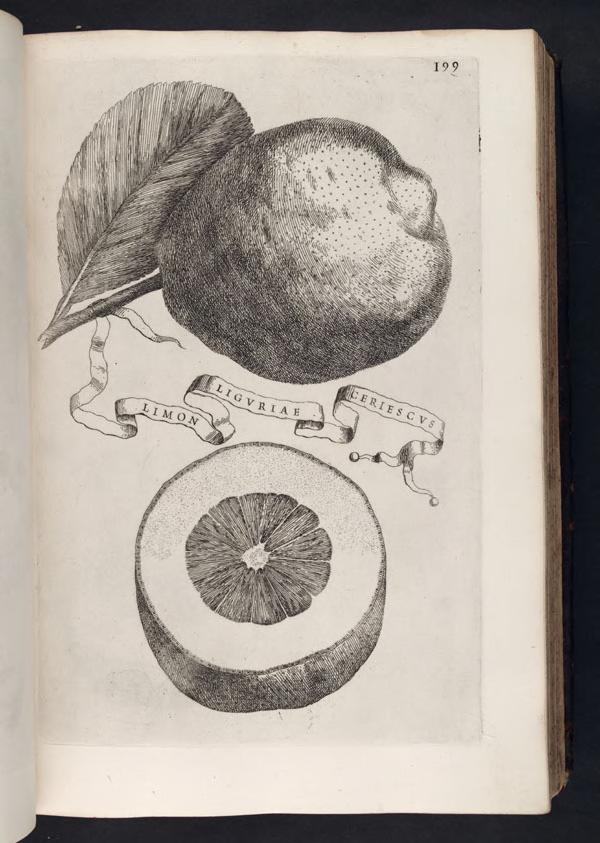
Limon liguriae ceriescus from Hesperides (1646)

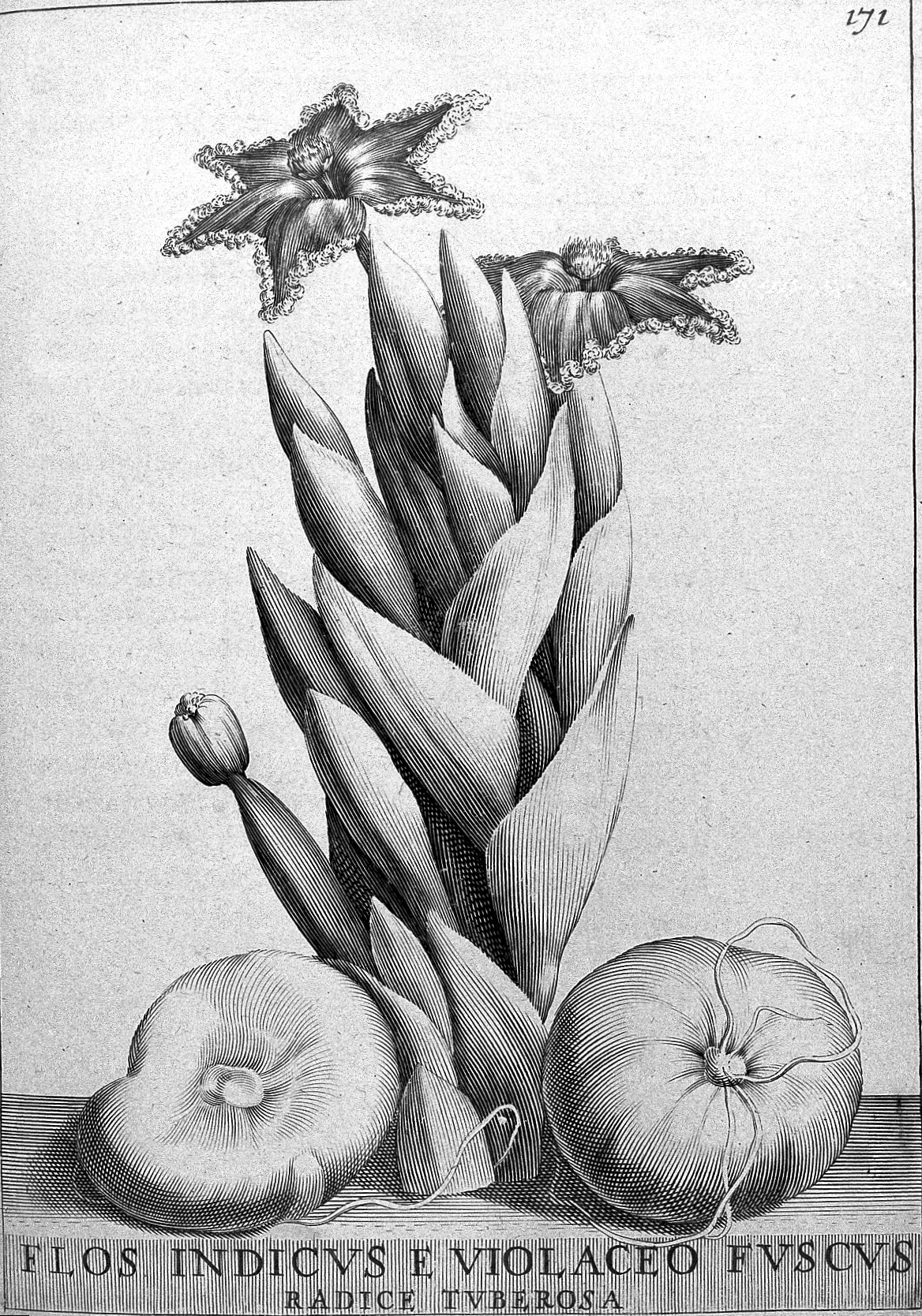
Flos indicus e violaceo fuscus radice tuberosa from Flora, seu de florum cultura (1646)

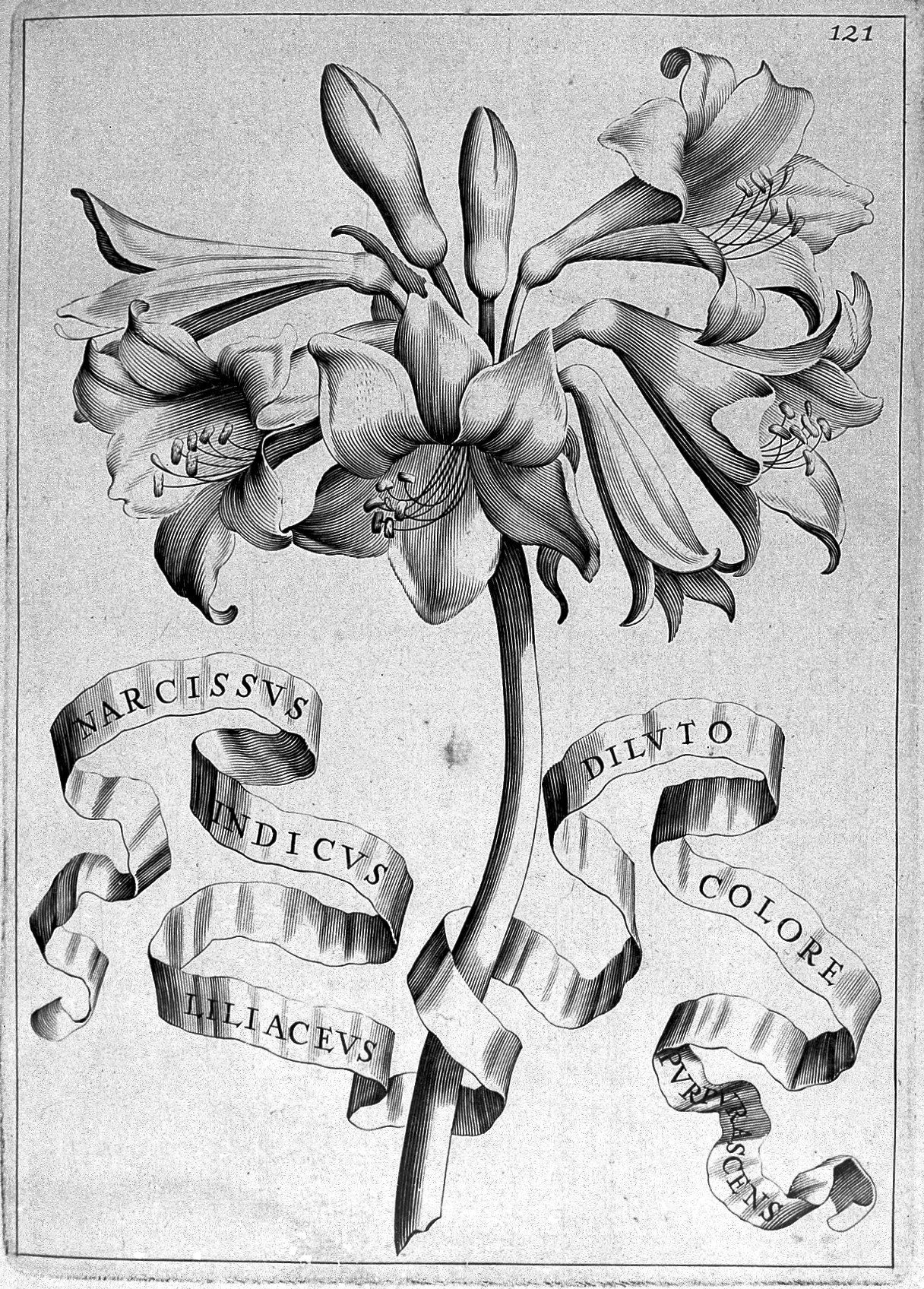
Narcissus indicus Liliaceus diluto colore purpurascens from Flora, seu de florum cultura (1646)

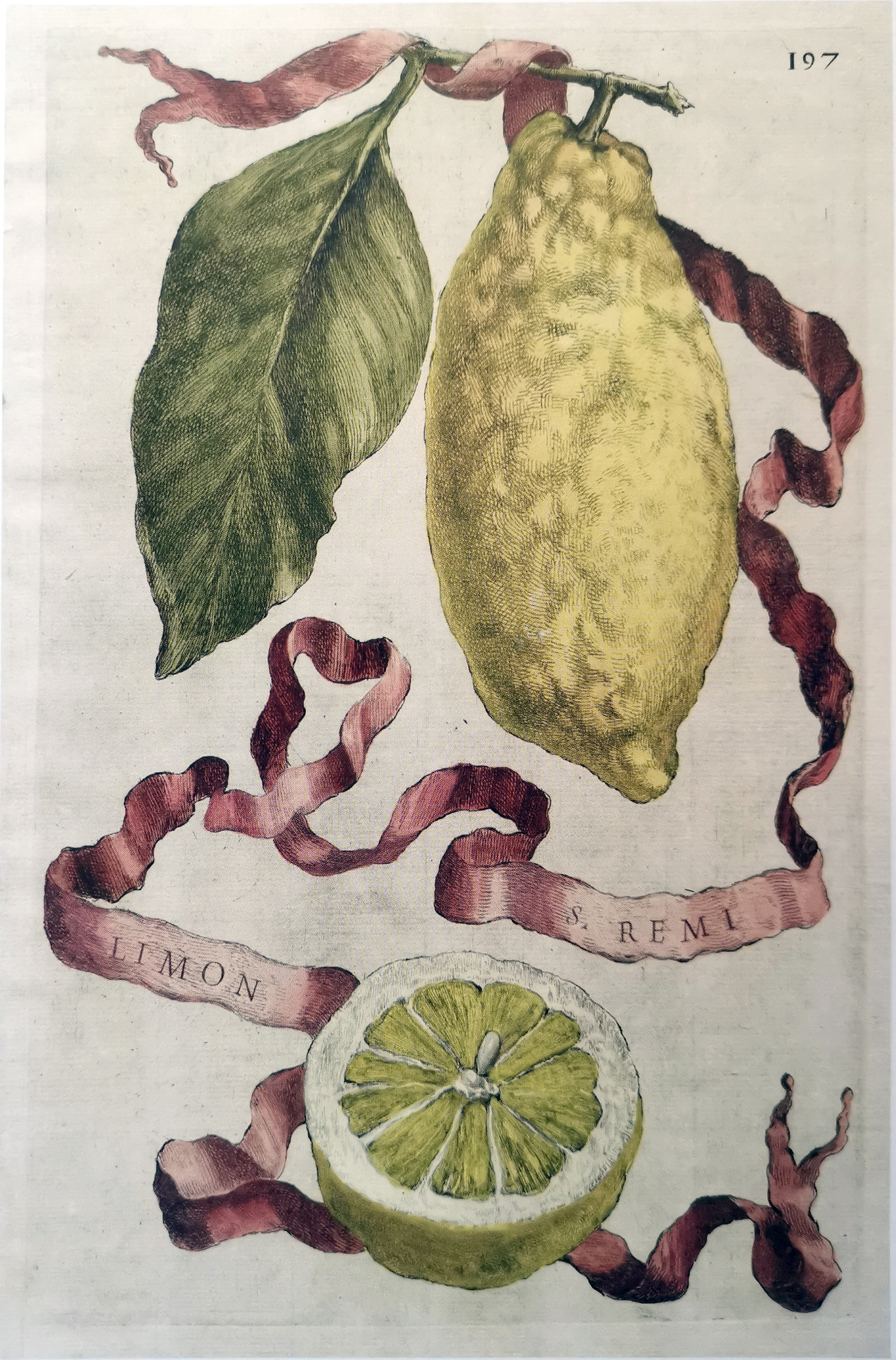
Limon S. Remi from Hesperides (1646)

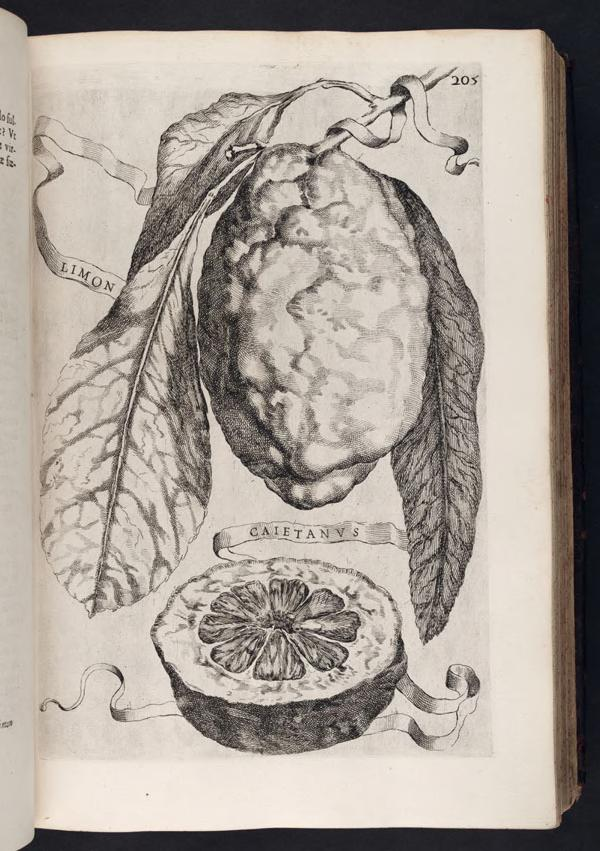
Limon Caietanus from Hesperides (1646)

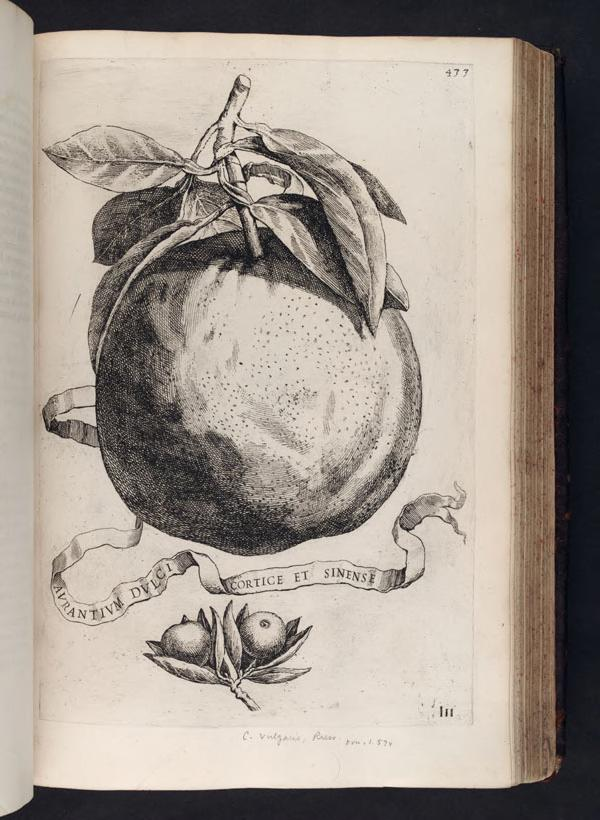
Aurantium dulci cortice et Sinense from Hesperides (1646)

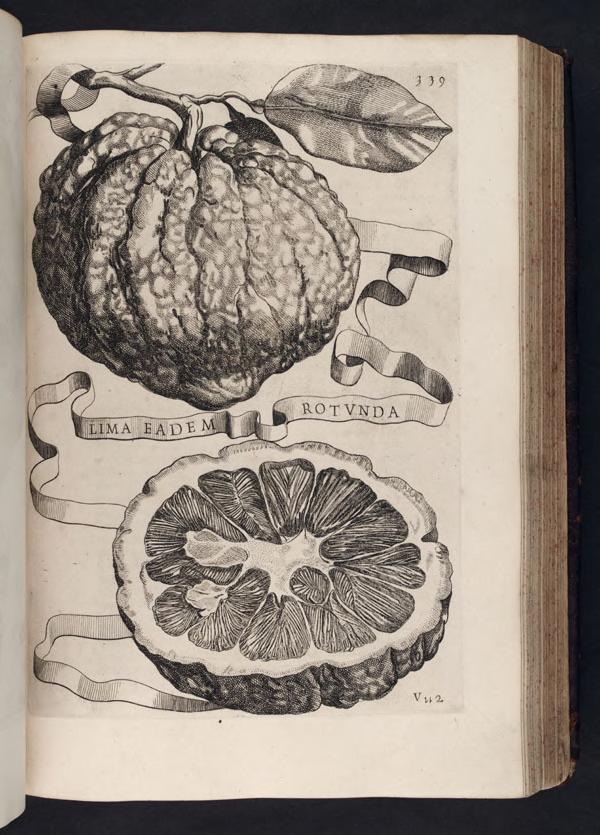
Lima eadem rotunda from Hesperides (1646)

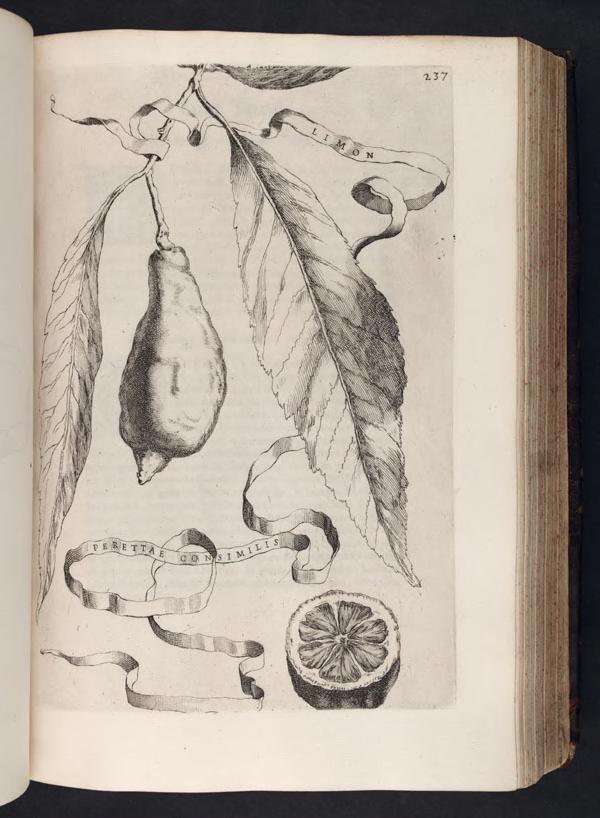
Limon perettae consimilis from Hesperides (1646)

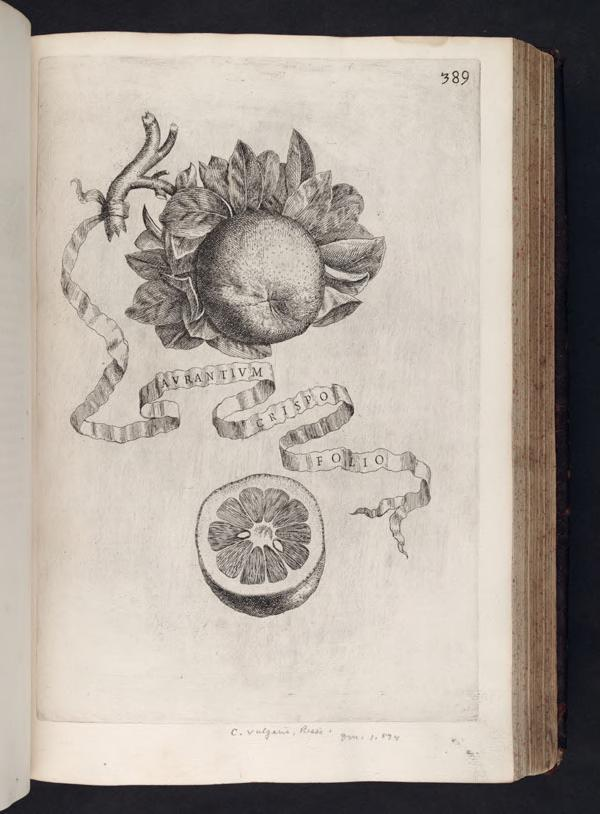
Aurantium crispo folio from Hesperides (1646)

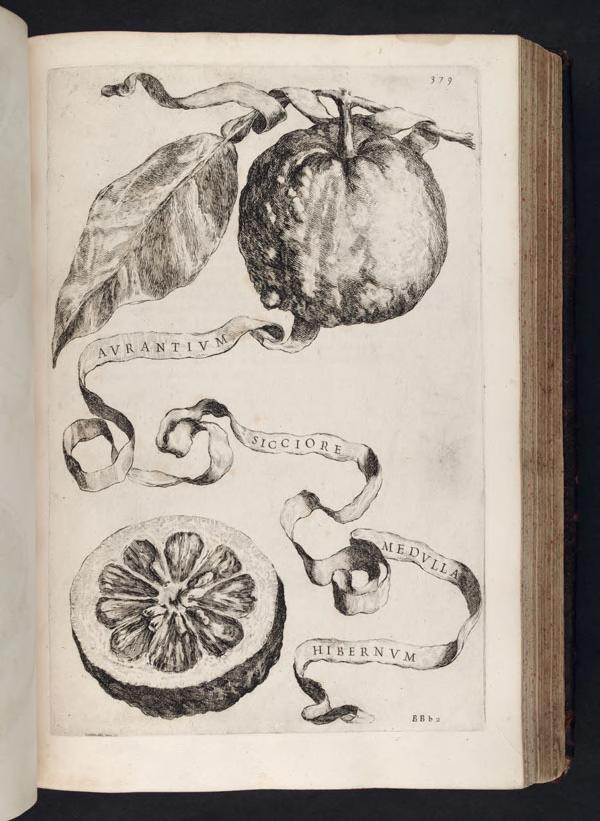
Aurantium sicciore medulla hibernum from Hesperides (1646)

== Works ==
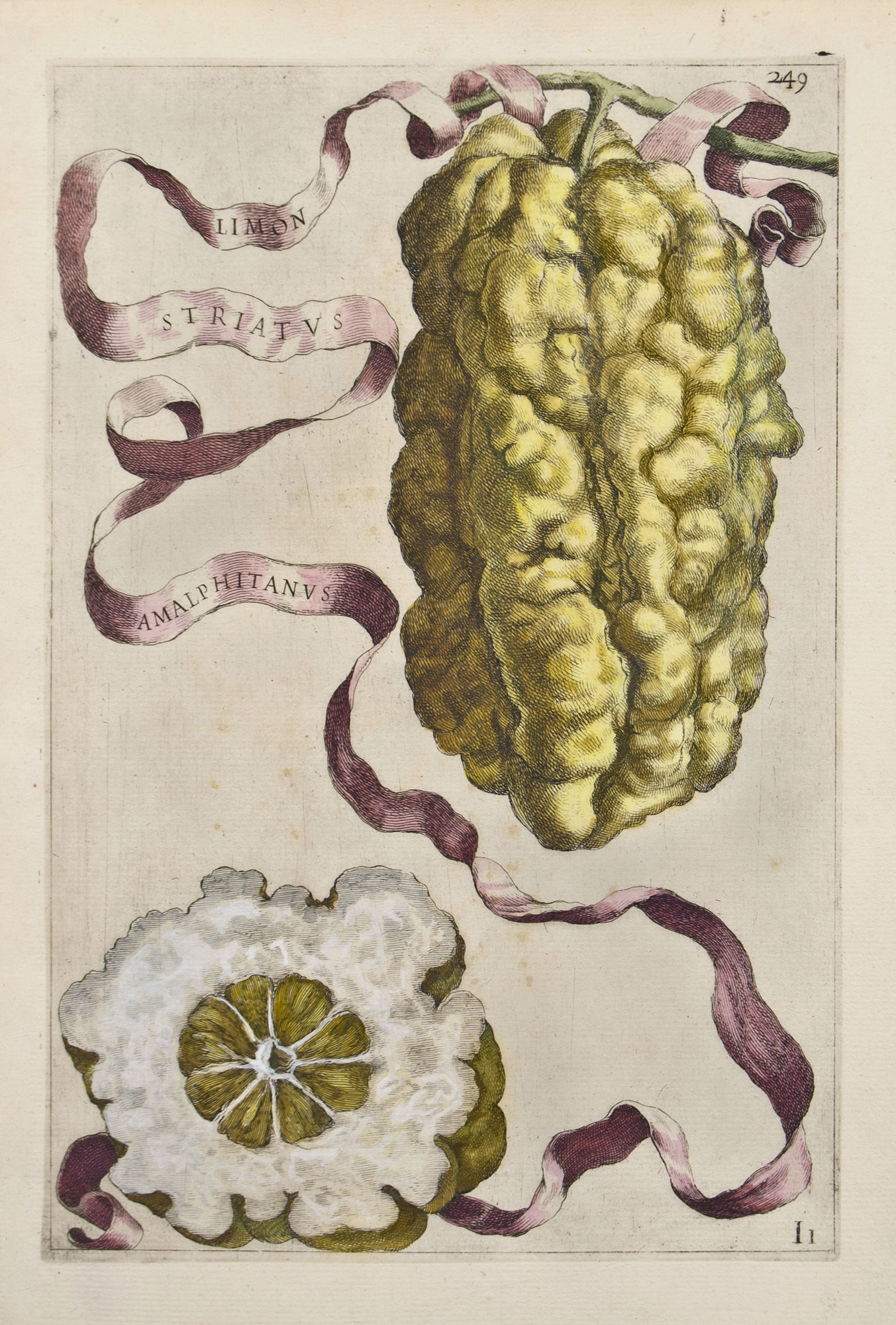
Striatus amalphitanus. Handcoloured copper plate engraving from Giovanni Baptista Ferrari's Hesperides, 1646.

- Ferrari, Giovanni Battista (1622). Nomenclator syriacus Io. Baptistae Ferrarii Senensis e Societate Iesu (in Latin). Stefano Paolini.
- Hesperides siue de malorum aureorum cultura et vsu Libri quator Io. Baptistae Ferrarii Senensis e Societate Iesu, Romae: Sumptibus Hermanni Scheus, 1646.
- In funere Marsilij Cagnati medici praestantissimi laudatio Ioannis Baptistae Ferrarij Senensis e Societate Iesu: habita in aede S. Mariae in Aquiro 5. Kal. Augusti 1612, Romae: apud Iacobum Mascardum, 1612.
- Io. Bapt. Ferrarii ... De florum cultura libri 4, Romae: excudebat Stephanus Paulinus, 1633.
- Io. Bapt. Ferrarii Senen. Societatis Iesu Orationes, Lugduni: sumptibus Ludouici Prost, haeredis Rouille, 1625.
- Io. Bapt. Ferrarii Senensis ... Orationes, Venetiis: apud Beleonium, 1644.
- Io. Bapt. Ferrarii Senensis e Soc. Iesu Orationes, Romae: apud Franc. Corbellettum, 1627.
- Io. Bapt. Ferrarii Senensis e Societate Iesu Orationes quartum recognitae et auctae, (Romae: typis Petri Antonij Facciotti, 1635).
- Io. Baptistae Ferrarii senensis ... Orationes, Mediolani: apud haer. Pacifici Pontij, & Io. Baptistam Piccaleum, impressores archiepiscopales, 1627.
- Io. Bapt. Ferrarii Senensis e Societ. Iesu Orationes, Nouissima editio iuxta exemplar, Coloniae: apud Cornel. Egmont, imprim. 1634.
- Io. Baptistae Ferrarii Senensi, S.I. Flora, seu De florum cultura lib. 4, Editio nova. Accurante Bernh Rottendorffio, Amstelodami: prostant apud Joannem Janssonium, 1664.
- Io. Baptistae Ferrarii Senensi, S.I. Flora, seu de florum cultura lib. 4, Editio nova. Accurante Bernh Rottendorffio ..., Amstelodami: Prostant apud Joannem Janssonium, 1664.

== See also ==
- List of Jesuit scientists
- List of Catholic clergy scientists
- History of botany
- List of florilegia and botanical codices
- Hesperides in the Renaissance

== Sources ==
- Chalmers, Alexander (1814). "Ferrari (John Baptist)". General Biographical Dictionary. Vol. 14. J. Nichols. p. 236. This article incorporates text from this source, which is in the public domain.
- Ceresa, Massimo (1996). "FERRARI, Giovanni Battista". Dizionario Biografico degli Italiani (in Italian). Vol. 46: Feducci–Ferrerio. Rome: Institute of the Italian Encyclopaedia. ISBN 978-88-12-00032-6.
- Grand, Stanley Irwin (1985). Seven Allegorical Engravings from Giovanni Battista Ferrari's De Florum Cultura (Rome, 1633). University of Wisconsin-Madison.
- Freedberg, David (1989). "Cassiano dal Pozzo's Drawings of Citrus Fruits". Il Museo Cartaceo di Cassiano Dal Pozzo. Cassiano Naturalista, Quaderni Puteani. I: 16–36.
- Freedberg, David (1997). Francesco Solinas (ed.). "From Hebrew and Gardens to Oranges and Lemons: Giovanni Battista Ferrari and Cassiano del Pozzo". Cassiano dal Pozzo, Atti del Seminario Internazionale di Studi. Rome: De Luca: 37–72.
- Ferrari, Giovan Battista. "Flora overo Cultura di Fiori." 1638. Facsimile edition, Florence: Leo S. Olschki, 2001.
