= Johann Friedrich Greuter =

German painter and engraver (1590–1662)

- Entombment of Christ, engraved by Greuter after Ferraù Fenzoni, 1640, Rijksmuseum, Amsterdam
- Born: c. 1590; Strasbourg, Holy Roman Empire
- Died: 10 March 1662; Rome, Papal States
- Occupations: Engraver; Draftsman
- Movement: Baroque
- Father: Matthaeus Greuter

Johann Friedrich Greuter (c. 1590 – 10 March 1662) was an Austrian engraver and draftsman active in Rome.

== Biography ==
Johann Friedrich Greuter was born in Strasbourg around 1590. He was the son of Matthaeus Greuter, from whom he received his initial artistic education. He moved to Rome with his father in 1603. His earliest known dated work is a 1619 portrait of Stanislaus Kostka, based on a drawing by Antonio Circignani, with whom Greuter maintained a close professional relationship in the following years. In 1622, he engraved a portrait of the Portuguese canonist Agostinho Barbosa. This work is likely based on Greuter's own drawing, as the signature does not credit an original designer. From around the same period dates a somewhat more informal portrait of Giambattista Marino, based on a painting by Simon Vouet. Around 1627, Greuter produced a series of five engravings on the Life of St. Peter Nolasco, based on drawings by the Aragonese artist Jusepe Martínez, who travelled to Rome in 1623 to complete his artistic training and stayed until 1627.

The 1630s were a period of intense activity for Greuter. In association with the Barberini family, he contributed to the illustration of lavish, beautifully printed books, such as Maffeo Barberini's (later Pope Urban VIII) Poemata, published in Rome in 1631. For this work, Greuter engraved David with the Harp based on a drawing by Gianlorenzo Bernini. contributed copperplate engravings to Giovanni Baptista Ferrari's botanical and floricultural treatise, De Florum Cultura Libri IV, a work sponsored by Cardinal Francesco Barberini. Greuter also produced plates for Ferrari's Orationes XXV (Lyon, 1625) and, most notably, Hesperides (Rome, 1646). The most prominent artists of the Barberini court (Cortona, Romanelli, Sacchi and Poussin) and Emilian painters who worked in Rome (Reni, Domenichino, Lanfranco, Albani) contributed illustrations to this project.

Neptune in his Chariot, engraved by Greuter after Pietro da Cortona, 1633, Rijksmuseum, Amsterdam

In the 1640s, Greuter worked on several celebratory projct promoted by the Barberini. He produced five engravings for the 1640 edition of Francesco da Barberino's Documenti d'Amore – a lavish publication sponsored by the Cardinal Francesco Barberini, widely considered one of the most beautifully printed books of the 17th century. Greuter also engraved the frontispiece – drawn by Andrea Camassei – for Girolamo Teti's treatise Aedes Barberinae, describing the art and architecture of the Palazzo Barberini in Rome. He produced engravings depicting Pope Urban VIII and allegorical prints celebrating the Barberini family, working closely with leading Roman artists of the high Baroque, such as Pietro da Cortona and Giovanni Lanfranco, who greatly valued his talent.

Little is known about Greuter's final years. It has been suggested that he travelled to Madrid in 1654, where the Imprenta Real (Royal Press) published El devoto peregrino, viage de Tierra Santa by Friar Antonio de Castillo. This work features an intaglio frontispiece signed by Greuter. However, it is uncertain whether such a trip took place, as parish records show that Greuter remained in Rome without interruption. In any case, his connection to Spanish authors and works predates this period, and he may have fulfilled the commission for the Imprenta Real without ever leaving Italy. His signature on the title page of Francisco Hernández de Toledo's botanical treatise, Rerum medicarum Novae Hispaniae Thesaurus (Rome, 1648), also suggests a connection to Spanish authors and works. Greuter died in Rome on 10 March 1662, aged 72. His prints were highly valued, and Michael Bryan considered him a better engraver than his father. Guillaume Chasteau was one of his pupils.

== Gallery ==
Titlepage of Giovanni Baptista Ferrari's De Florum Cultura, engraved by Greuter after Pietro da Cortona, Rome, 1633, Rijksmuseum, Amsterdam

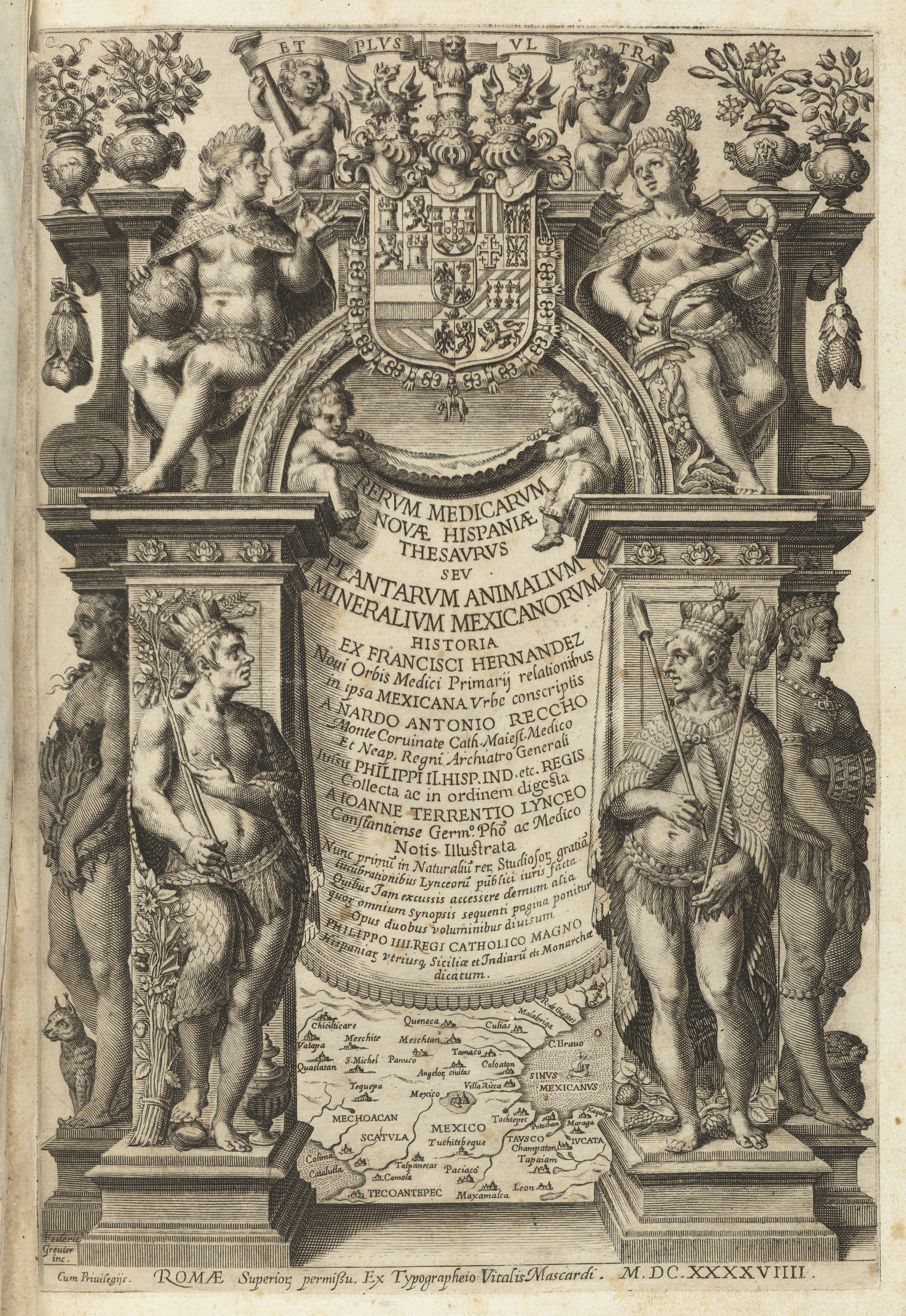
Title page of Francisco Hernández de Toledo's Rerum medicarum Novae Hispaniae Thesaurus, Rome, 1648

Allegory of Pope Urban VIII, National Gallery of Denmark, Copenhagen

Allegory of the House of Medici, engraved by Greuter after Antonio Circignani, Metropolitan Museum of Art, New York

== Bibliography ==
- Guerrieri Borsoi, Maria Barbara (2002). "Greuter, Johann Friedrich". Dizionario Biografico degli Italiani (in Italian). Vol. 59: Graziano–Grossi Gondi. Rome: Institute of the Italian Encyclopaedia. ISBN 978-88-12-00032-6.
- "Greuter, Giovanni or Johann Friedrich". Benezit Dictionary of Artists. Oxford: Oxford University Press. 2011. doi:10.1093/benz/9780199773787.article.B00078874.
