= Alessandro Vaiani =

Italian painter (1636–1700)

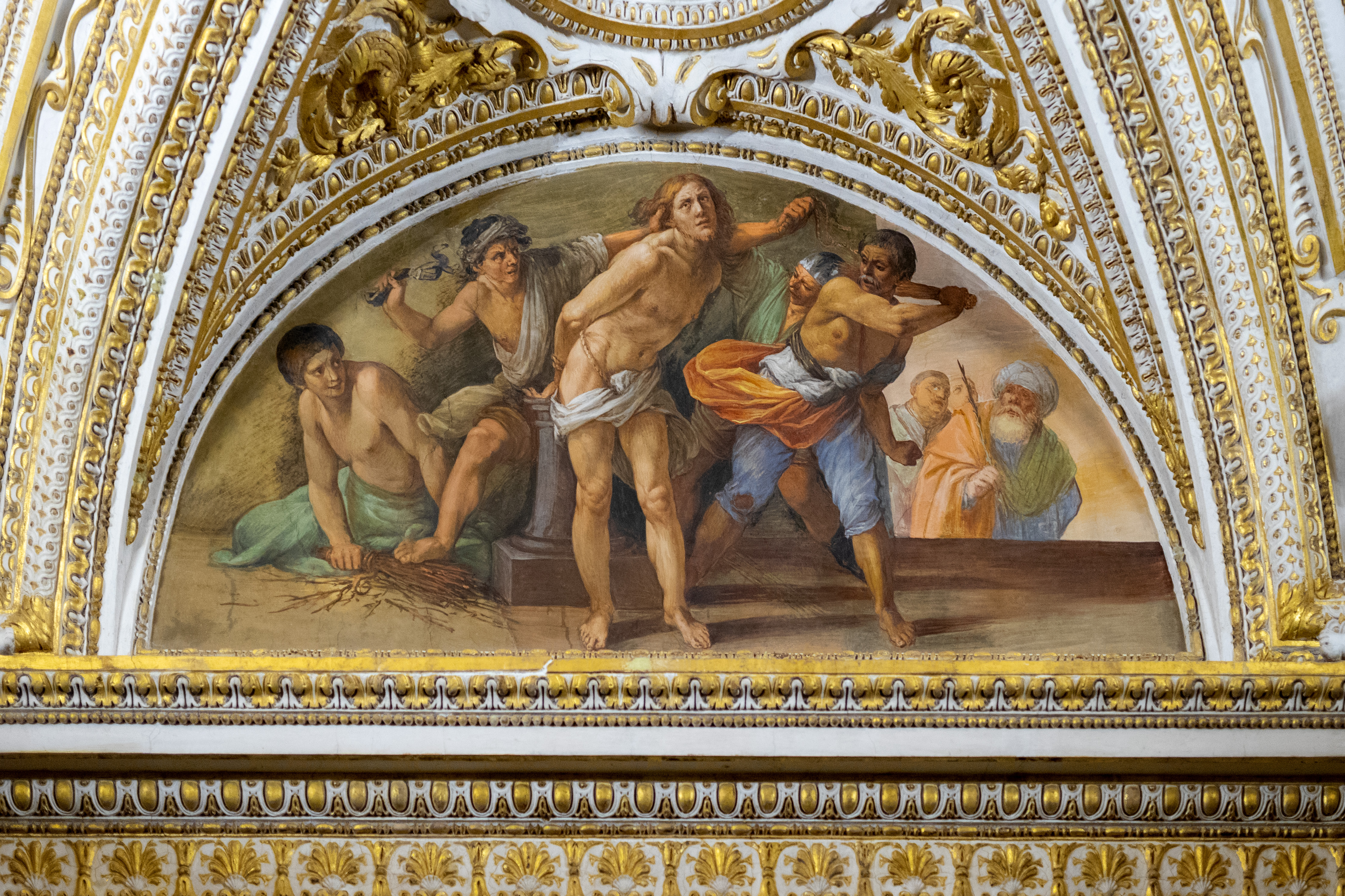

Alessandro Vaiani, who also goes by the name Orazio Vajani or Vajano was an Italian painter of the early 17th century.

He painted for some years in Milan, with works in San Carlo and Sant'Antonio Abate. He also painted in Genoa.

His daughter, Anna Maria Vaiani (born 1604), was also an artist, who apparently had an unfelicitous marriage with the painter Jacques Courtois.
