= Milnerton Racecourse Nature Reserve =

Lowland conservation area in the City of Cape Town, South Africa

- Formerly "Royal Ascot Conservation Area"
- Location within Cape Town Location within Western Cape
- Location: Milnerton, Western Cape, South Africa
- Coordinates: 33°51′37″S 18°30′30″E
- Area: 19 hectares (0.19 km^{2})
- Governing body: City of Cape Town
- Website: www.capetown.gov.za/en/environmentalresourcemanagement/Pages/default.aspx

The Milnerton Racecourse Nature Reserve is a lowland conservation area located in the City of Cape Town, South Africa.

It forms part of the greater Table Bay Nature Reserve, proclaimed in June 2012.

== Location ==
The Milnerton Racecourse Nature Reserve, formerly also known as Royal Ascot Conservation Area, is situated in Royal Ascot, Milnerton, South Africa. It consists of the land inside the tracks of the former Milnerton Racecourse and is now managed by the City of Cape Town's Environmental Resource Management Department.

== History ==
The land inside the track of the Milnerton Racecourse has remained relatively untouched by development as well as free of invasive alien plants due to the removal of tall alien trees that would obstruct views of the running horses.

== Management ==
The Milnerton Racecourse Nature Reserve comprises two non-contiguous natural areas separated and surrounded by the up-market residential development of Royal Ascot. The management of these two areas resides with the City of Cape Town as the landowner. This is accomplished through the Environmental Management Committee which comprises several stakeholders including the Royal Ascot Master Property Owners Association and Gold Circle (owners of the Milnerton Racecourse). The Environmental Management Committee is responsible for the implementation of the Environmental Management System.

=== Environmental Management Committee ===
The Environmental Management Committee was established as a condition of the approval of the application for rezoning of the Milnerton Racecourse land (Erf 25939) from Private Open Space to Sub-divisional Area, by the local authority, City of Cape Town: Blaauwberg Administration in terms of the Land Use Planning Ordinance No 15 of 1985 and by the Department of Environmental and Cultural Affairs and Sport in terms of the Environmental Conservation Act No 73 of 1989. The subdivided erf 25939 is now known as the Royal Ascot Development.

== Access ==
Because of the botanical importance of this conservation area, botanists recommended that the southern portion of the racetrack not be opened to the public. The northern portion is accessible to the public where there is a footpath. Access to take dogs on a leash through this area was allowed in the past, but now dogs are no longer allowed there.

== Biodiversity ==
=== Geology and vegetation ===
The Milnerton Racecourse Nature Reserve has an unusual geology consisting of neutral to slightly acidic sand on ferricrete. It is one of the last natural habitats situated on ferricretes, from where the name Ysterplaat is derived. The vegetation comprises Cape Flats Sand Fynbos, although some elements of Cape Flats Dune Strandveld also occur here. There are 232 recorded plant species of which 12 have “Red Data” status including Cliffortia ericifolia, Hermannia procumbens ssp. procumbens, Leucadendron levisanus, Acrolophia bolusii and Lampranthus stenus.

=== Water and fauna ===
There are two small wetlands in the area, but during winter several more small temporary wetlands develop, providing habitat for more than 70 bird species. At least 10 species of butterflies and moths have been recorded. There was a small population of steenbok, but they have disappeared from the area. There is however still a population of grysbok in both the northern and southern parts of the reserve.

List of mammals in the reserve

Updated from South African Biodiversity Database as species present on 2011/01/05

1. Aonyx capensis (Cape clawless otter)
2. Atilax paludinosus (water mongoose)
3. Bathyergus suillus (Cape dune molerat)
4. Cryptochloris asiatica (Cape golden mole)
5. Galerella pulverulenta (small grey mongoose)
6. Genetta tigrina (large-spotted genet)
7. Georychus capensis (Cape mole-rat)
8. Hystrix africaeaustralis (porcupine)
9. Lepus capensis (Cape hare)
10. Raphicerus campestris (steenbok)
11. Raphicerus melanotis (Cape grysbok)
12. Rhabdomys pumilio (striped mouse, striped field mouse)
13. Tatera afra (Cape gerbil)
List of birds in the reserve

Updated from South African Biodiversity Database (http://www.biodiversity.co.za/) as present on 2011/01/05

1. Accipiter melanoleucus (black sparrowhawk)
2. Acrocephalus scirpaceus (common reed-warbler)
3. Acrocephalus gracilirostris (lesser swamp-warbler)
4. Alopochen aegyptiacus (Egyptian goose, kolgans)
5. Amaurornis flavirostris (black crake)
6. Anas erythrorhyncha (red-billed teal)
7. Anas smithii (Cape shoveler)
8. Anas undulata (yellow-billed duck)
9. Anhinga rufa (African darter)
10. Apus affinis (little swift)
11. Apus barbatus (African black swift)
12. Apus caffer (white-rumped swift)
13. Ardea cinerea (grey heron)
14. Ardea melanocephala (black-headed heron)
15. Ardea purpurea (purple heron)
16. Bostrychia hagedash (hadeda ibis)
17. Bradypterus baboecala (little rush-warbler)
18. Bubulcus ibis (cattle egret)
19. Burhinus capensis (spotted thick-knee, spotted dikkop)
20. Burhinus vermiculatus (water thick-knee, water dikkop)
21. Buteo vulpinus (steppe buzzard)
22. Calandrella cinerea (red-capped lark)
23. Charadrius pecuarius (Kittlitz's plover)
24. Charadrius tricollaris (three-banded plover)
25. Cinnyris chalybeus (southern double-collared sunbird)
26. Cisticola juncidis (zitting cisticola)
27. Cisticola subruficapilla (grey-backed cisticola)
28. Cisticola tinniens (Levaillant's cisticola)
29. Columba guinea (speckled pigeon)
30. Columba livia (feral pigeon, rock dove)
31. Corvus albicollis (white-necked raven)
32. Corvus albus (pied crow)
33. Crithagra flaviventris (yellow canary)
34. Delichon urbicum (common house-martin)
35. Egretta garzetta (little egret)
36. Estrilda astrild (common waxbill)
37. Euplectes capensis (yellow bishop)
38. Euplectes orix (southern red bishop)
39. Falco peregrinus (peregrine falcon)
40. Falco rupicolus (rock kestrel)
41. Fulica cristata (red-knobbed coot)
42. Gallinago nigripennis (African snipe, Ethiopian snipe)
43. Gallinula chloropus (common moorhen)
44. Himantopus himantopus (black-winged stilt)
45. Hirundo albigularis (white-throated swallow)
46. Hirundo cucullata (greater striped swallow)
47. Hirundo dimidiata (pearl-breasted swallow)
48. Hirundo fuligula (rock martin)
49. Hirundo rustica (barn swallow)
50. Lanius collaris (southern fiscal, fiscal shrike)
51. Larus dominicanus (kelp gull)
52. Larus hartlaubii (Hartlaub's gull)
53. Macronyx capensis (Cape longclaw)
54. Merops apiaster (European bee-eater)
55. Microcarbo africanus (reed cormorant)
56. Milvus migrans (black kite, yellow-billed kite)
57. Motacilla capensis (Cape wagtail)
58. Neophedina cincta (banded martin)
59. Numida meleagris (helmeted guineafowl)
60. Nycticorax nycticorax (black-crowned night-heron)
61. Onychognathus morio (red-winged starling)
62. Passer domesticus (house sparrow)
63. Passer melanurus (Cape sparrow)
64. Pelecanus onocrotalus (great white pelican, wit pelikaan)
65. Phalacrocorax lucidus (white-breasted cormorant)
66. Platalea alba (African spoonbill)
67. Plectropterus gambensis (spur-winged goose)
68. Plegadis falcinellus (glossy ibis)
69. Ploceus capensis (Cape weaver)
70. Ploceus velatus (southern masked-weaver)
71. Podiceps cristatus (great crested grebe)
72. Prinia maculosa (Karoo prinia)
73. Pternistis capensis (Cape spurfowl)
74. Riparia paludicola (brown-throated martin)
75. Scleroptila africanus (grey-winged francolin)
76. Serinus canicollis (Cape canary)
77. Spilopelia senegalensis (laughing dove)
78. Streptopelia capicola (Cape turtle-dove)
79. Streptopelia semitorquata (red-eyed dove)
80. Sturnus vulgaris (common starling, European starling)
81. Tachybaptus ruficollis (little grebe)
82. Tachymarptis melba (alpine swift)
83. Telophorus zeylonus (bokmakierie)
84. Threskiornis aethiopicus (African sacred ibis)
85. Urocolius indicus (red-faced mousebird)
86. Vanellus armatus (blacksmith lapwing, blacksmith plover)
87. Vidua macroura (pin-tailed whydah)
88. Zosterops pallidus (Orange River white-eye)
89. Zosterops virens (Cape white-eye)
List of reptiles in the reserve

Updated from South African Biodiversity Database (http://www.biodiversity.co.za/) as present on 2011/01/05

1. Bradypodion pumilum (Cape dwarf chameleon)
2. Homopus areolatus (parrot-beaked tortoise, parrotbeaked tortoise)
3. Pelomedusa subrufa (marsh terrapin)
4. Psammophylax rhombeatus (rhombic skaapsteker)
5. Pseudaspis cana (mole snake)
List of amphibians in the reserve

Updated from South African Biodiversity Database (http://www.biodiversity.co.za/) as present on 2011/01/05

1. Amietia fuscigula (Cape river frog)
2. Strongylopus grayii (clicking stream frog)
3. Tomopterna delalandii (Cape sand frog)

== See also ==
- Table Bay Nature Reserve
- Cape Town
- City of Cape Town
- Milnerton Racecourse
- Rietvlei Wetland Reserve
- Biodiversity of Cape Town
- List of nature reserves in Cape Town
- Cape Flats Sand Fynbos
- Cape Flats Dune Strandveld
