= Milnerton Racecourse =

Training course and stabling at Milnerton, Western Cape, South Africa

Coordinates: 33.85374°S 18.50641°E

Milnerton Racecourse is located in Milnerton, Western Cape, South Africa and is owned and managed by Gold Circle. Though the racecourse is not used for races anymore, it is still used for the training and stabling of racing horses. Much of Gold Circle's land around the race track was sold for the development of the Royal Ascot residential precinct. The land inside the race tracks was retained by the City of Cape Town for nature conservation purposes. This conservation land was formerly called the Royal Ascot Conservation Area, but is now called the Milnerton Racecourse Nature Reserve.
