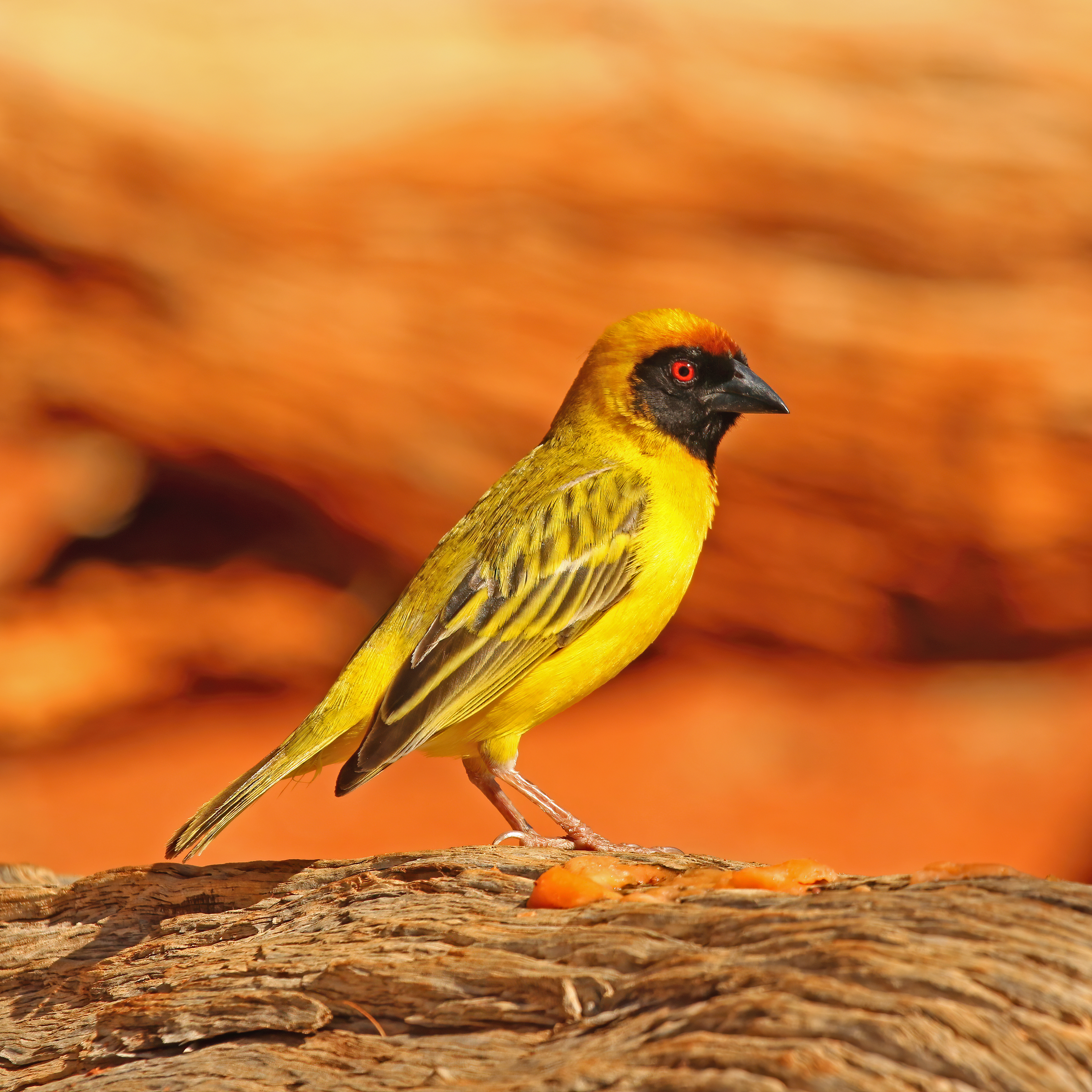
- Male, Tswalu Kalahari Reserve, South Africa
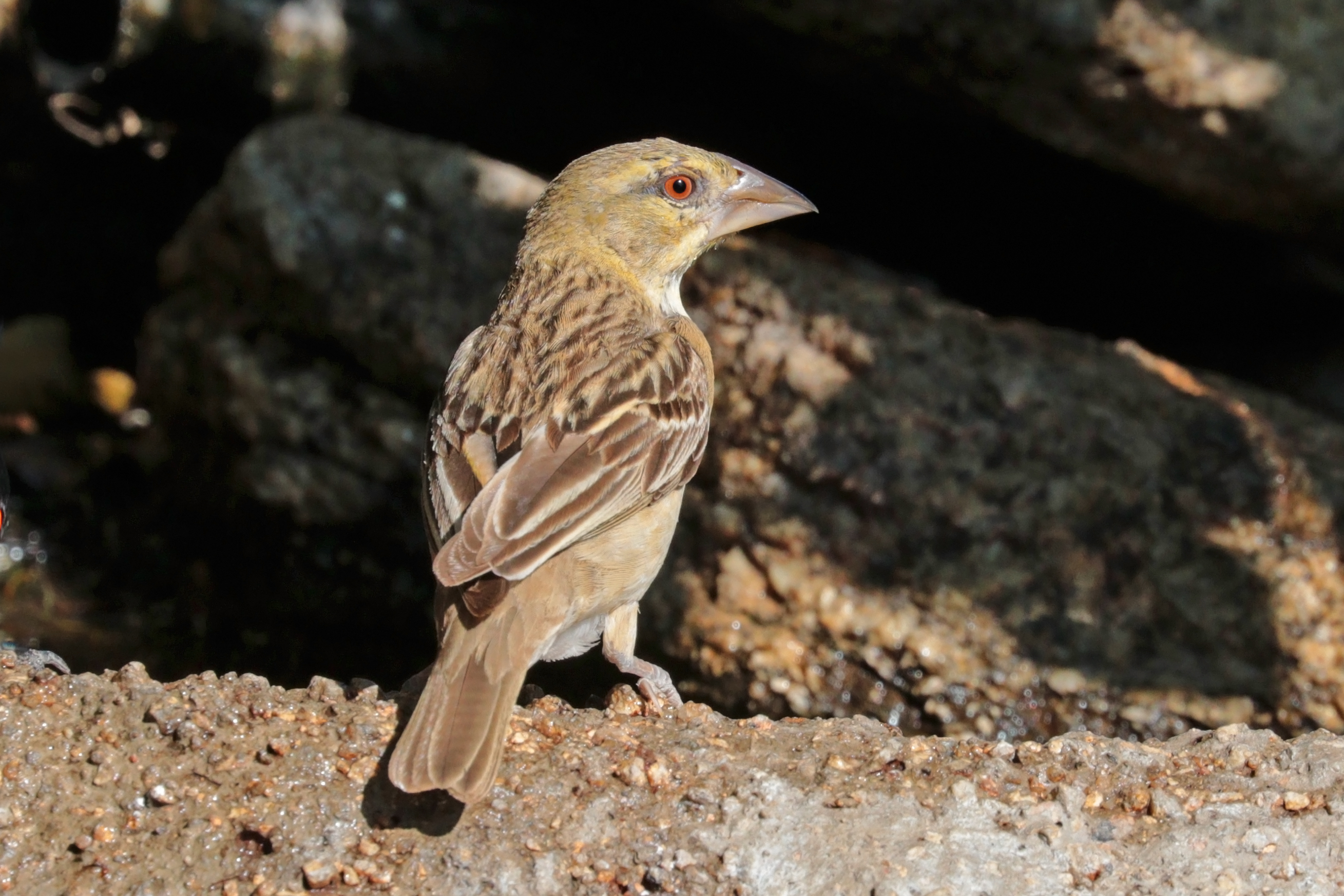
- Female, Erongo, Namibia

Conservation status
- Least Concern (IUCN 3.1)

Scientific classification
- Kingdom: Animalia
- Phylum: Chordata
- Class: Aves
- Order: Passeriformes
- Family: Ploceidae
- Genus: Ploceus
- Species: P. velatus

Binomial name
- Ploceus velatus Vieillot, 1819
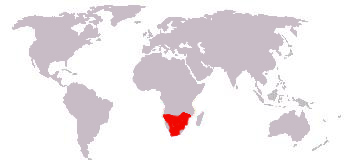
- Range

= Southern masked weaver =

Southern masked weaver bird

Species of bird

The southern masked weaver (Ploceus velatus), or African masked weaver, is a resident breeding bird species common throughout southern Africa.

This weaver is very widespread and found in a wide range of habitats, including shrubland, savanna, grassland, open woodland, inland wetlands and semi-desert areas. It also occurs in sub-urban gardens and parks.

== Description ==
The southern masked weaver is 11–14.5 cm (4.3–5.7 in) long with a short, strong, conical bill and pinkish brown legs. The adult male in breeding plumage has a black face, throat and beak, red eye, bright yellow head and underparts, and a plain yellowish-green back,

The female has a pinkish-brown bill, brown or red-brown eye and is dull greenish-yellow, streaked darker on the upper back. The throat is yellowish, fading to off-white on the belly. The non-breeding male resembles the female but retains the red eye. The juvenile of this species is like the female.

The call is a harsh swizzling, similar to other weavers. It also utters a sharp chuk alarm note.

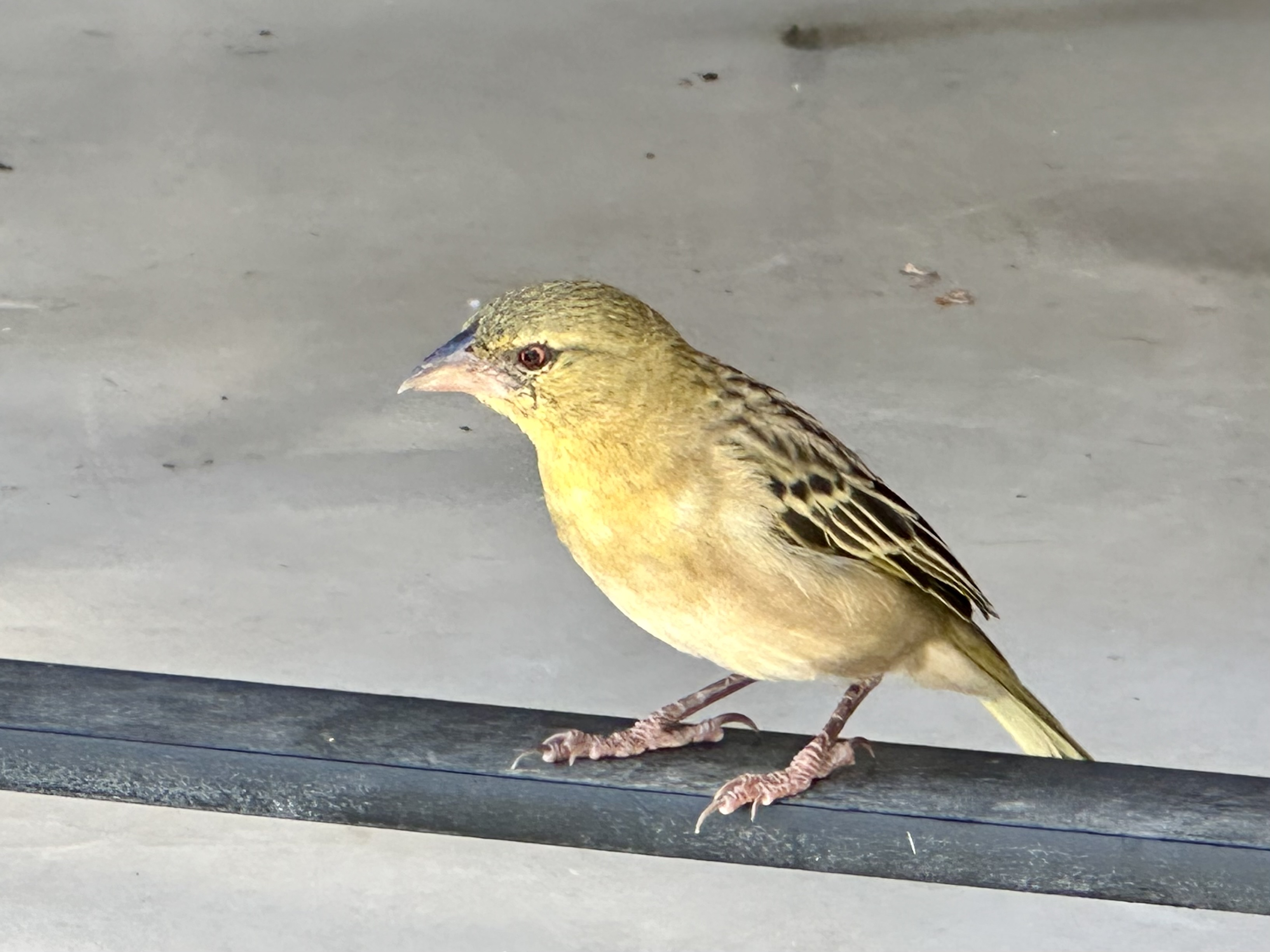
Southern Masked Weaver female in Namibia

== Behaviour and ecology ==
=== Nest building and breeding ===
The southern masked weaver nests in colonies, mainly from September to January. Males have several female partners, and build a succession of nests, typically 25 each season. The nests, like those of other weavers, are woven from reed, palm or grass. A female will line a selected nest with soft grass and feathers. The nest is built in a tree, often over water, but sometimes in suburbia. This weaver also nests in reeds.

The southern masked weaver lays eggs of a various colour and this helps it to evade parasitisation by cuckoos because the cuckoo has no way of knowing what kind of eggs are inside the weaver's nest until it has entered the nest to attempt to lay one itself. Eggs of the wrong colouration are ejected by the nest owners.

=== Feeding ===
The southern masked weaver is usually seen singly or in small groups. It may also form larger flocks, alone or with other seed eating species. It eats insects, seeds and nectar, and will come to feeding tables.

== Gallery ==
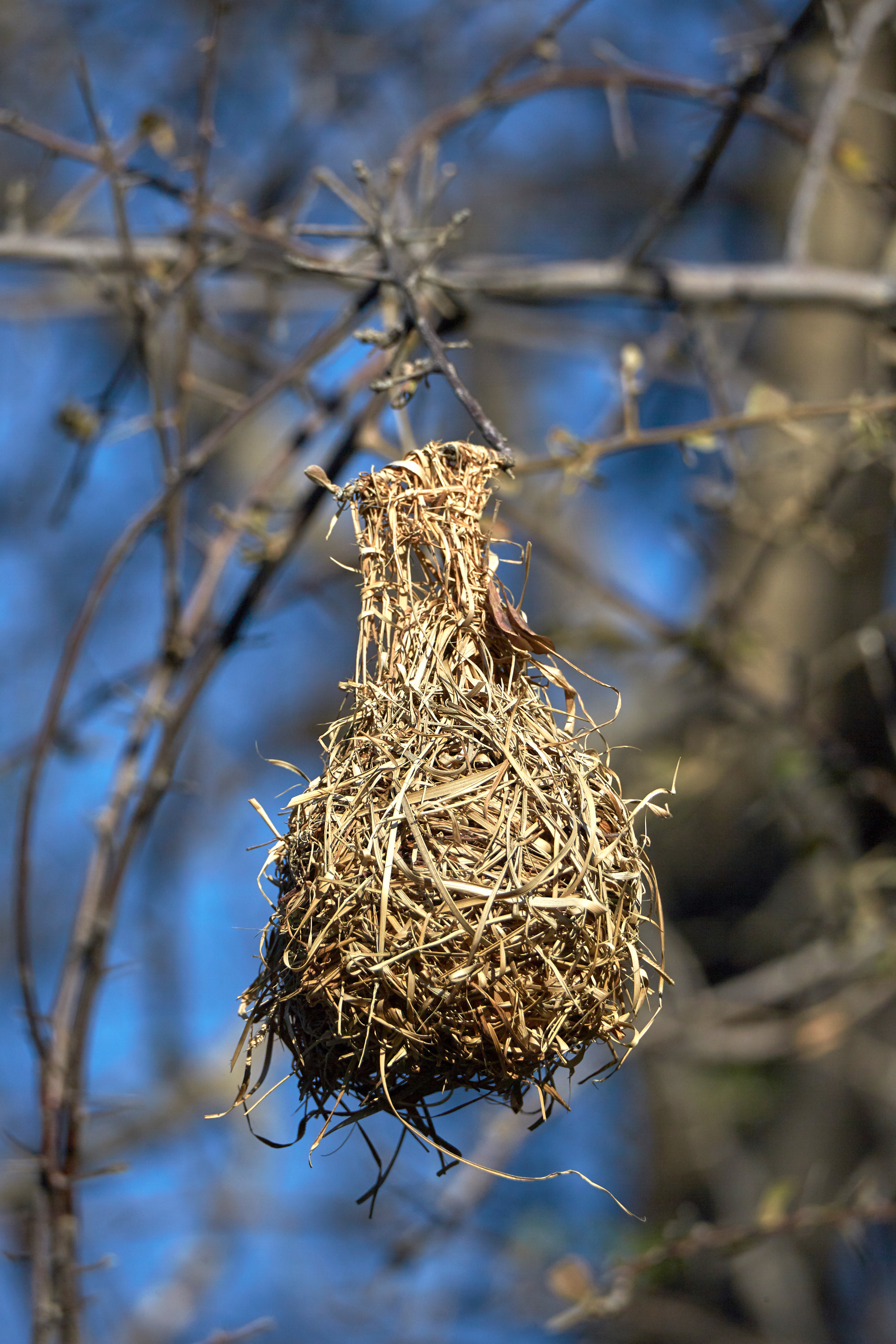
Finished nest with intricate details (Etosha, Namibia)

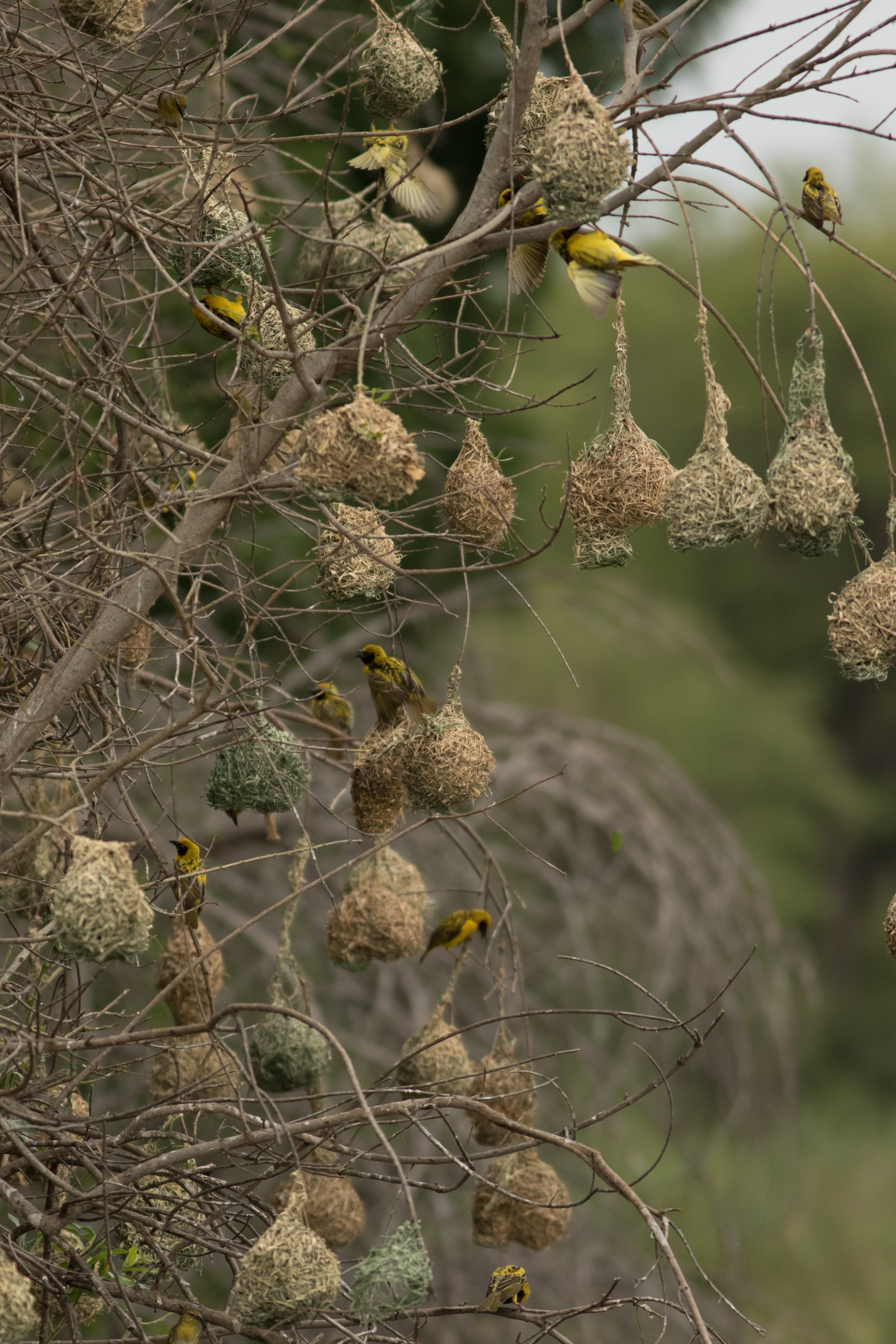
Nesting colony, Kruger National Park

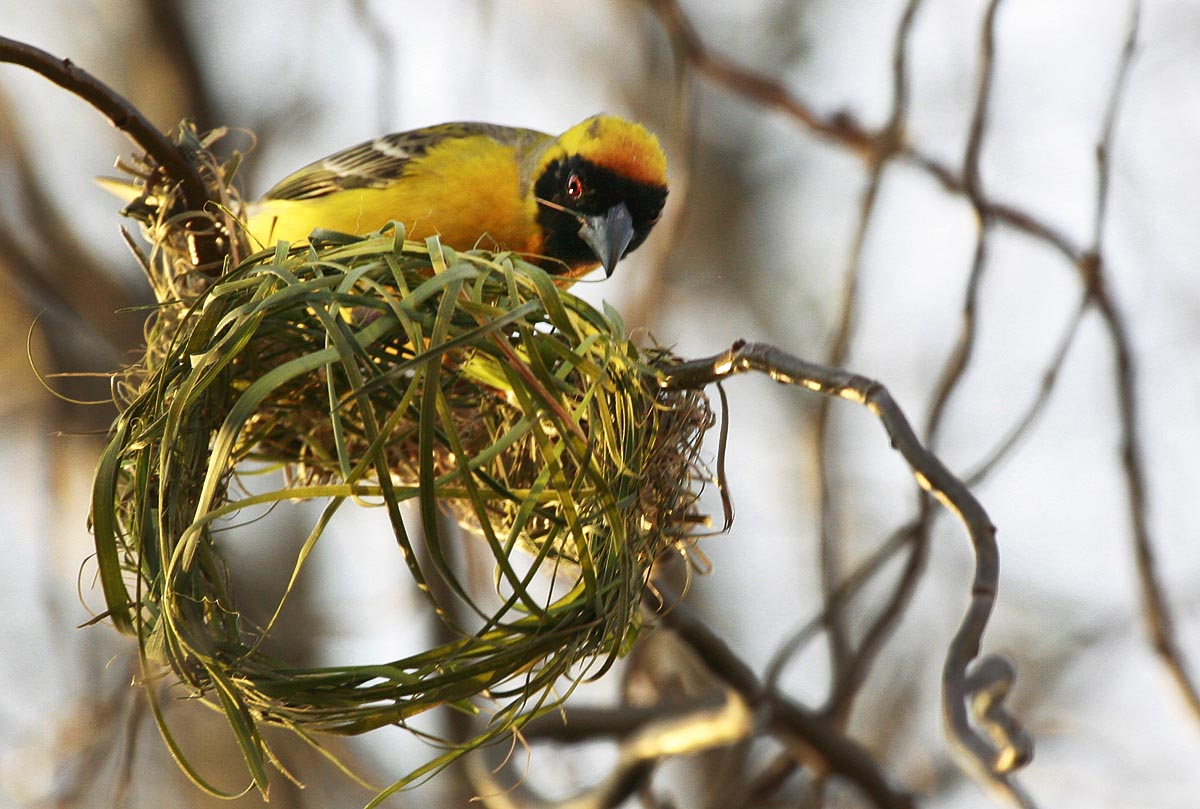
Male starting to build nest, Johannesburg

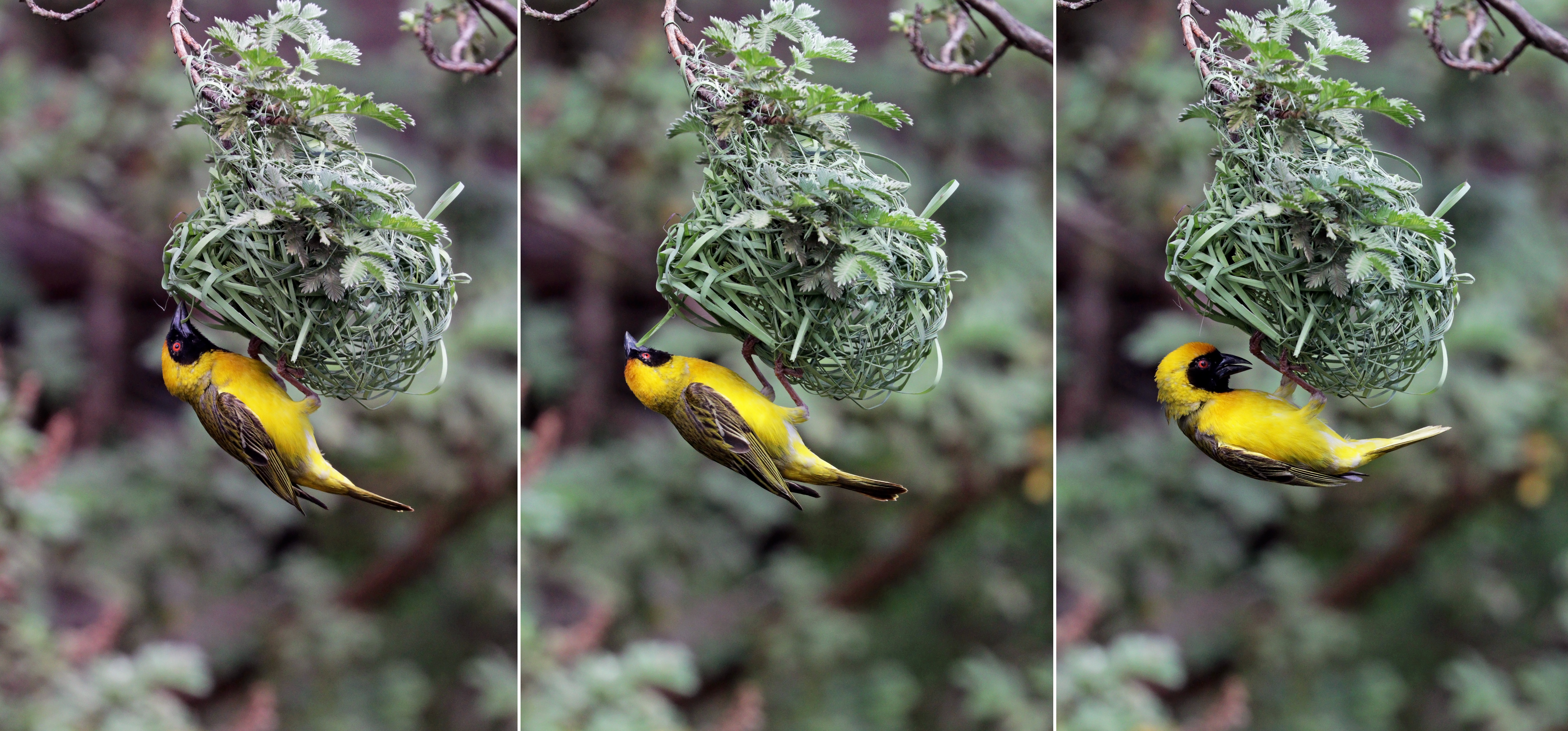
Male building nest, Johannesburg
