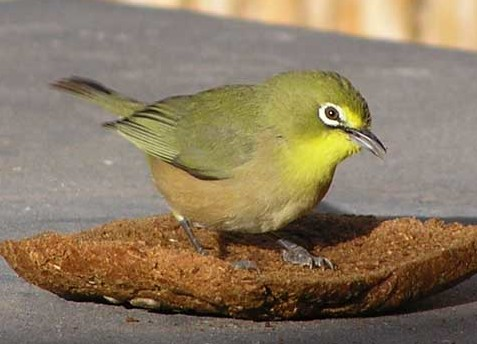
- Adult bird, lower Orange River, showing the sulphur-coloured face markings and tawny buff flanks and sides of breast

Conservation status
- Least Concern (IUCN 3.1)

Scientific classification
- Kingdom: Animalia
- Phylum: Chordata
- Class: Aves
- Order: Passeriformes
- Family: Zosteropidae
- Genus: Zosterops
- Species: Z. pallidus

Binomial name
- Zosterops pallidus Swainson, 1838
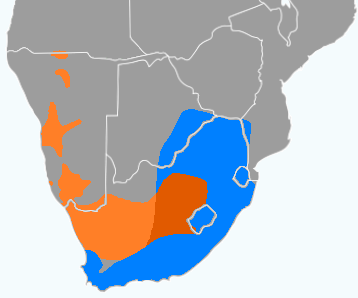
- range Z. pallidus only Z. pallidus in sympatry with Z. virens Cape white-eye (Z. virens) only

= Orange River white-eye =

Species of bird

The Orange River white-eye (Zosterops pallidus) is a species of bird in the family Zosteropidae, which is native to Namibia and South Africa. It was formerly deemed conspecific with the Cape white-eye (Zosterops virens), but the two species occur sympatrically in central South Africa, and they are genetically distinct.

== Subspecies ==
Four subspecies have been proposed based on plumage colour and size differences:

- Zosterops pallidus pallidus — Northern Cape, North West, Gauteng, Free State
- Zosterops pallidus sundevalli Hartlaub — tributaries of upper Orange and lower to mid Vaal River
- Zosterops pallidus deserticola Reichenow — lower Orange River and its tributaries
- Zosterops pallidus haigamchabensis — northern Namibia to Northern Cape, South Africa

== Range ==
It occurs at highest densities in the catchment areas of the Orange and Vaal Rivers, where it is locally very common. It is also present at more isolated locations in the Nama Karoo, Namaqualand, Namib, Namibian escarpment, uplands of Damaraland, and mopane-veld in the far north. In dry regions it associates with vegetation fringing periodically dry streambeds. No extensive movements have been recorded.

== Habitat ==
Forages in native and introduced willows (Salix spp.), currant-rhus (Searsia spp.), thorn trees (Acacia) and reeds (Phragmites). Commonly found in gardens, parks and plantations where it frequents any available vegetation.

== Description ==
The sexes are alike and measure 10–13 cm from bill to tail tip. It has pale olive green upper part plumage, a yellow throat and supraloral stripe, and a tawny buff tone to the flanks and sides of breast, which is regionally diagnostic. The lore plumage and bare parts are black. The juvenile plumage is a pale version of the adult's, and the white eye-rings appear during the second month.

== Habits ==
They glean insects from foliage and tree bark, but also take small fruit, including dry Searsia berries. Outside the breeding season they move about in small foraging parties. Individuals loosely follow the trail of a leading bird, and they have been noticed to mix with non-breeding Cape white-eyes. The usual song is subdued and muted except when excited, but a sustained warbling song is heard in the breeding season.

== Nesting ==
They breed during the summer months. Breeding information is very incomplete, but a clutch of three pale blue eggs has been recorded. Dry pliable plant material is used in building the deep cup nest, which is slung between horizontal twigs and strengthened with cobweb.

== Gallery ==
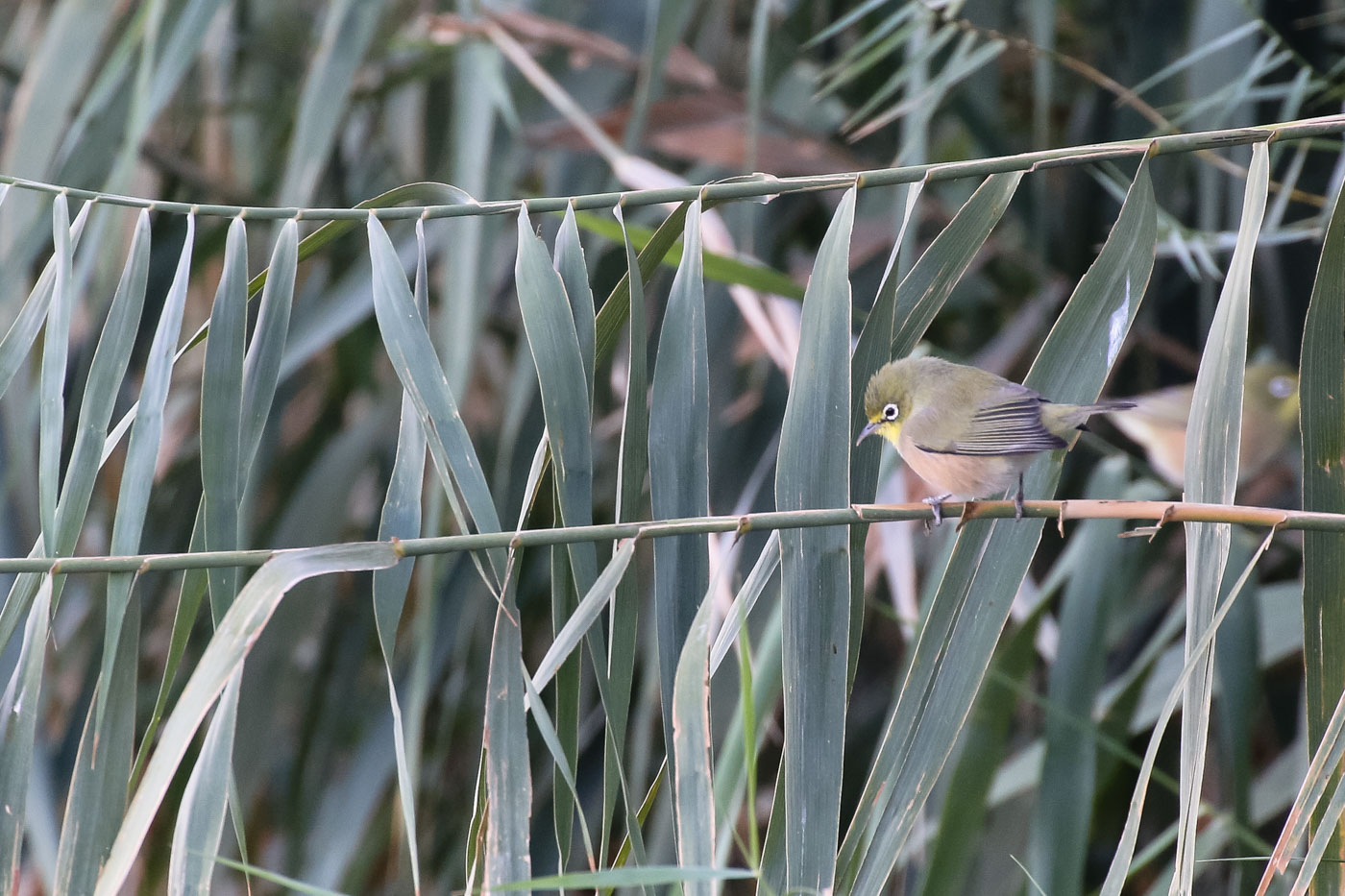
Perched on a Phragmitis reed near Aussenkehr, lower Orange River

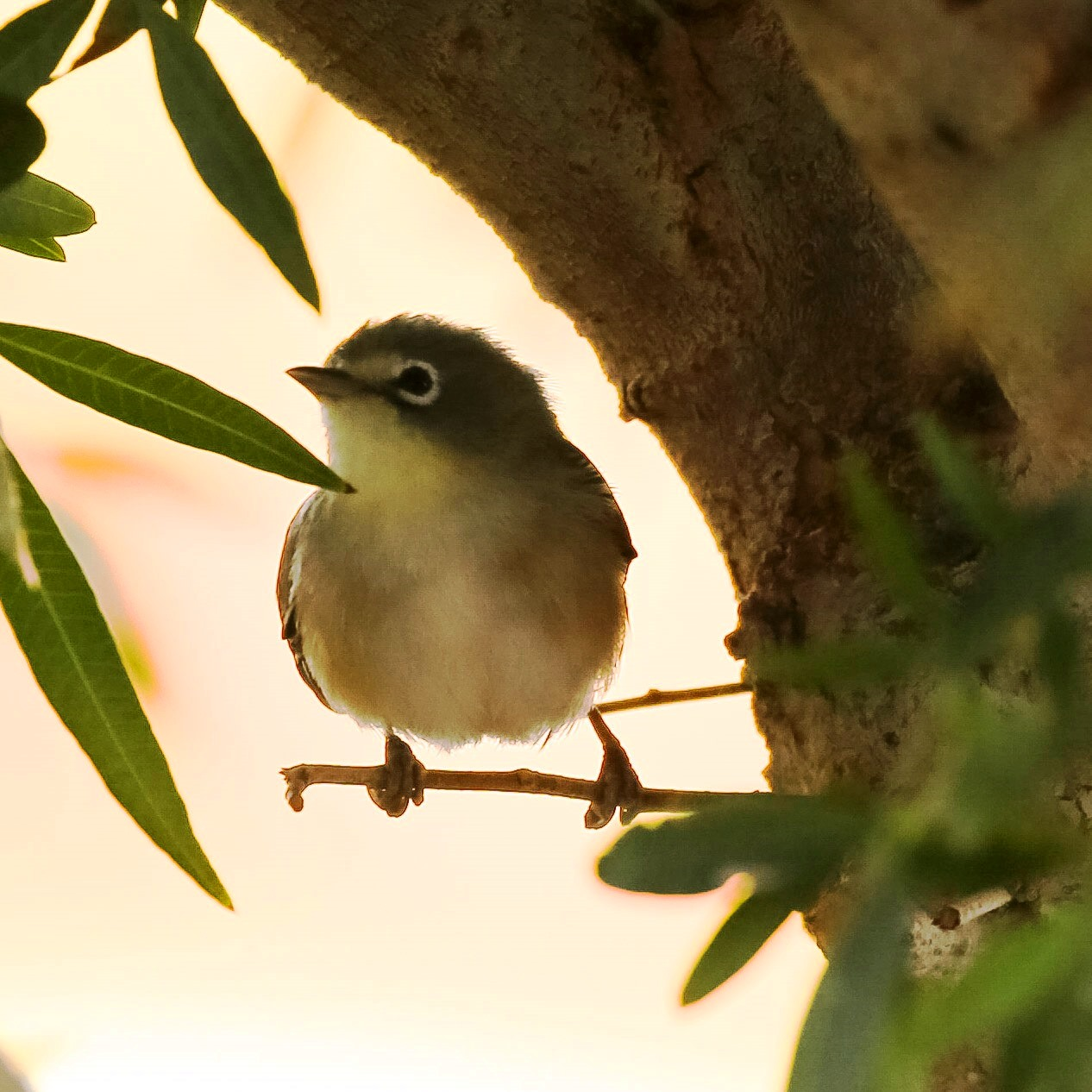
Near Aussenkehr on the lower Orange River
