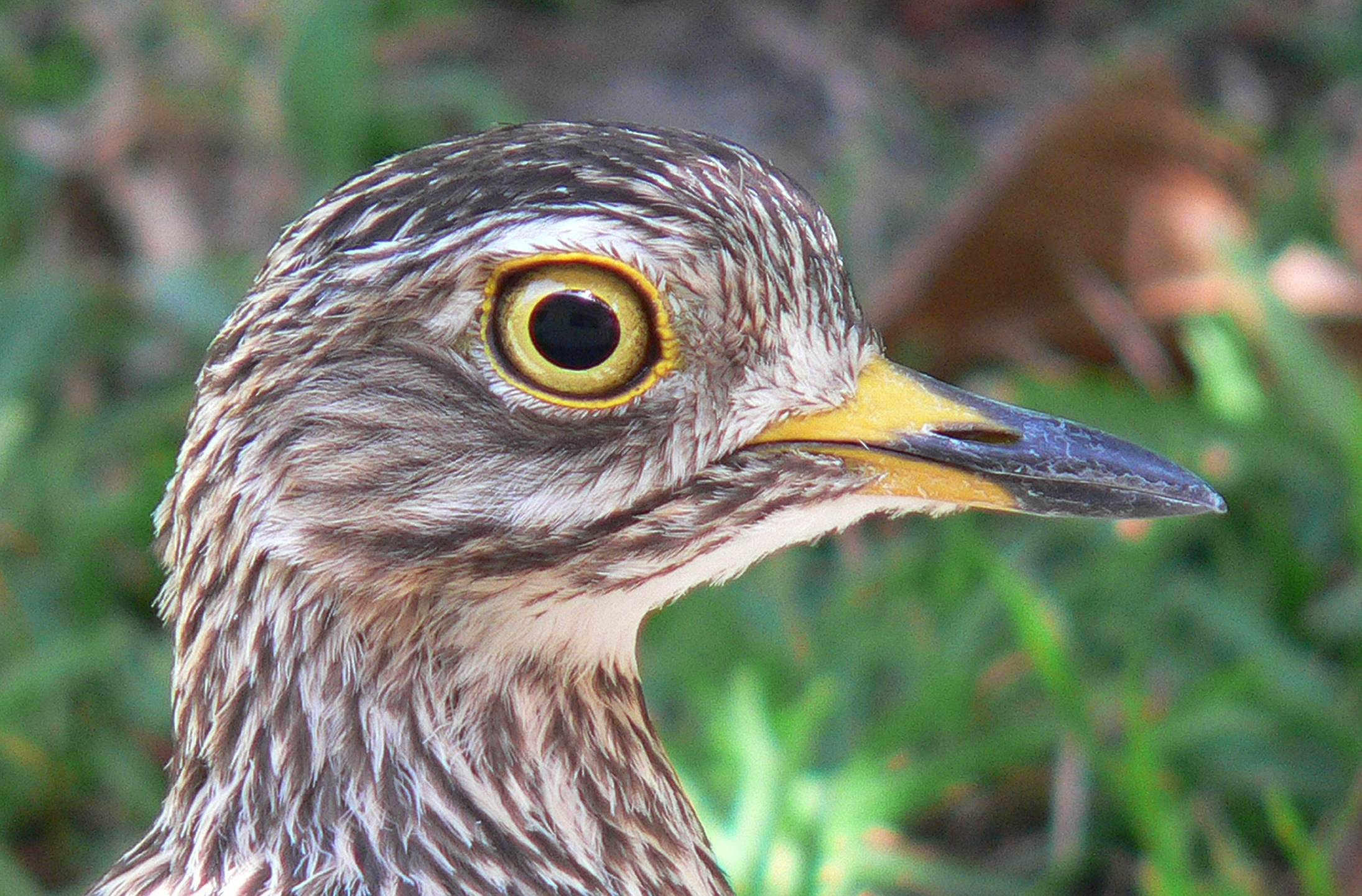

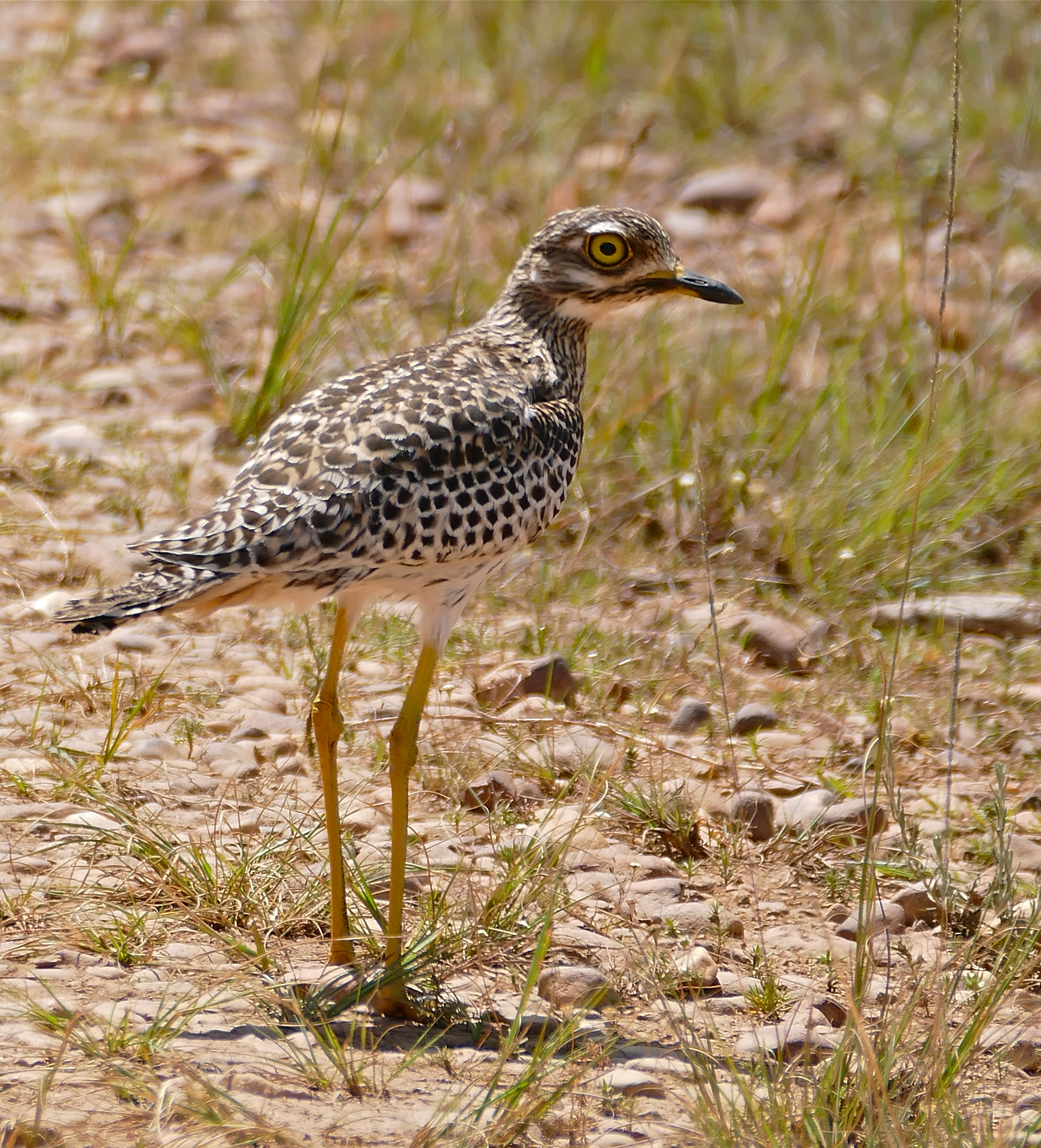

Conservation status
- Least Concern (IUCN 3.1)

Scientific classification
- Kingdom: Animalia
- Phylum: Chordata
- Class: Aves
- Order: Charadriiformes
- Family: Burhinidae
- Genus: Burhinus
- Species: B. capensis

Binomial name
- Burhinus capensis (Lichtenstein, MHC, 1823)
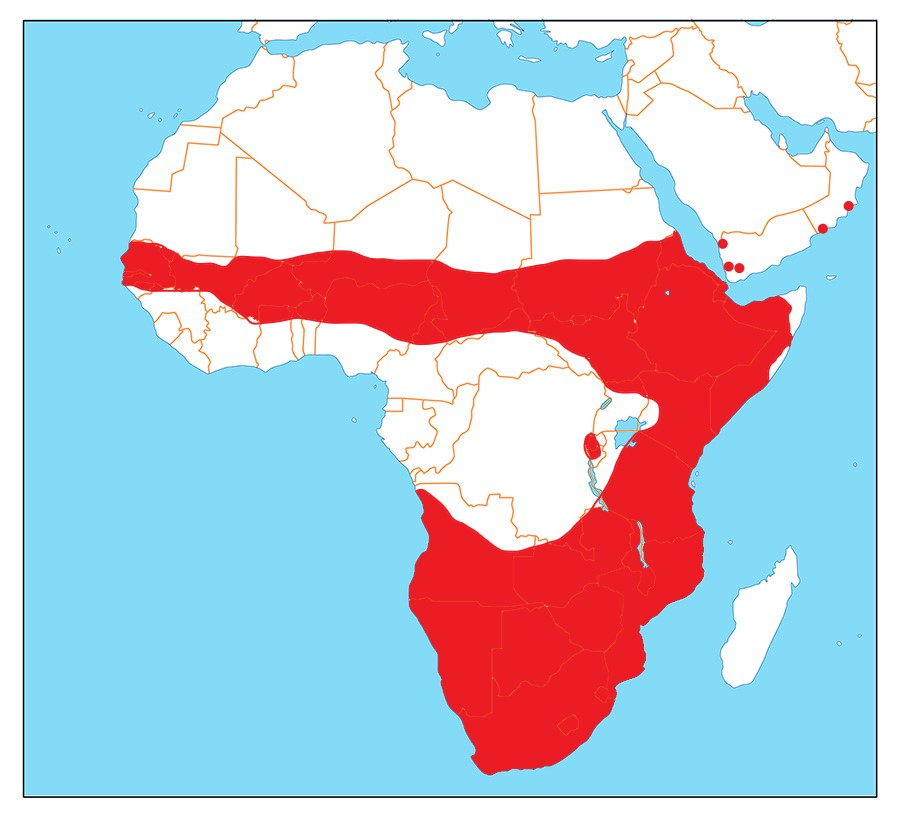
- Range

= Spotted thick-knee =

Species of bird

The spotted thick-knee (Burhinus capensis), also known as the spotted dikkop or Cape thick-knee, is a wader in the family Burhinidae. It is native to tropical regions of central and southern Africa.

== Description ==
The spotted thick-knee, which can reach up to 45.5 cm (17.9 in) in height, has long legs and brown-and-white speckled plumage which provides camouflage, making it difficult to spot the bird in the grasslands and savannas where it roams. Its head is large and round with a prominent yellow eye and a short, stout beak. When in flight or standing in a characteristic position with its wings raised, it shows a striking contrasting pattern. Its legs are long and yellow and the tibiotarsal joint is expanded, giving it the name "thick-knee".

== Behaviour ==
Calling at night in a suburban area

The spotted thick-knee is nocturnal and squats on the ground during the daytime, making it difficult to spot. It hunts exclusively on the ground, feeding on insects, small mammals and lizards.

== Breeding ==
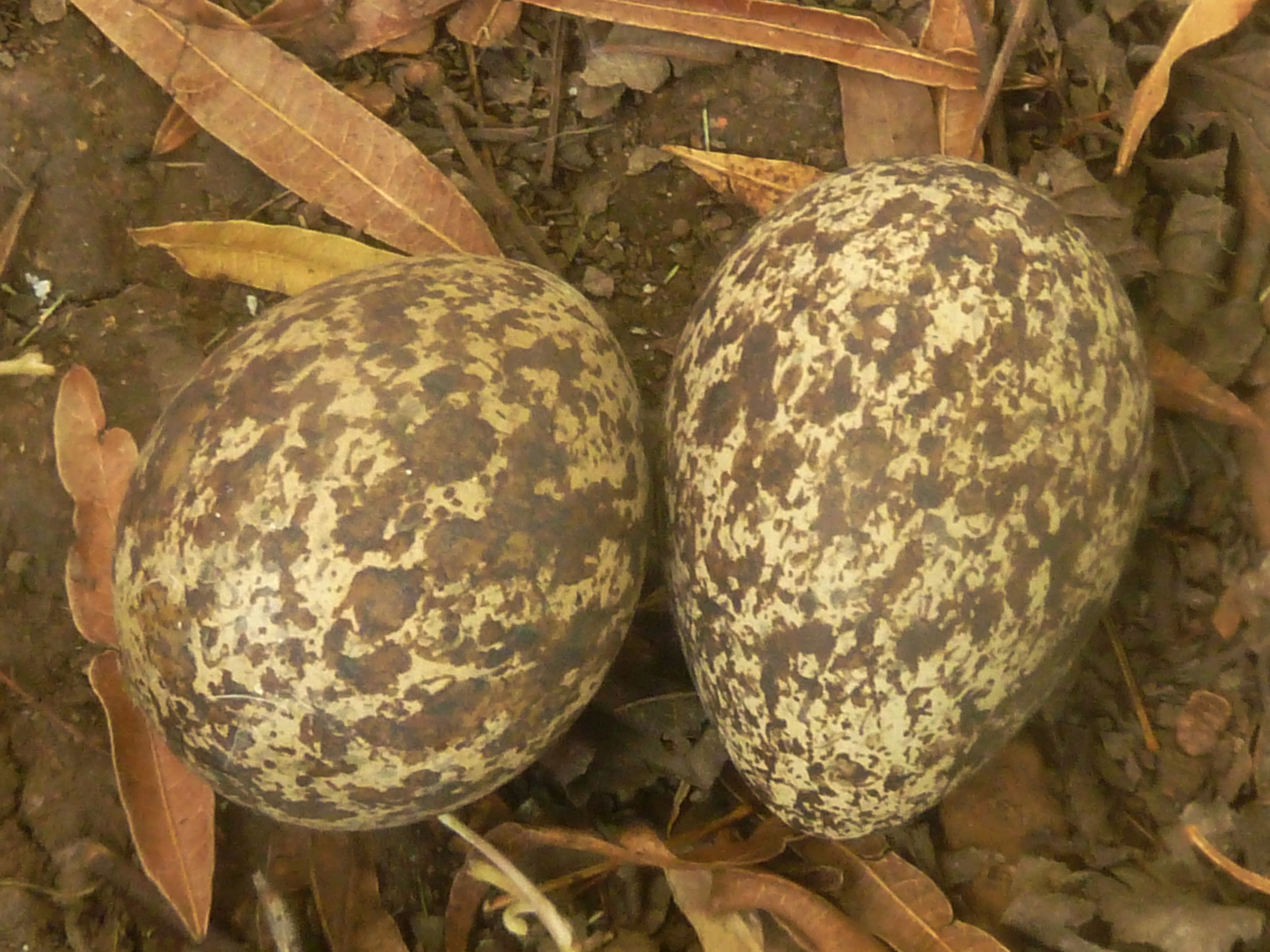
Usually 2 eggs are laid at a two-day interval. They measure some 5.2 cm × 3.8 cm. They are marked with sepia brown and ash grey on a pale, clay-coloured background.

It nests on the ground, lining a scrape with grasses, feathers, pebbles and twigs. The female typically lays two eggs, and males and females rear the offspring together, with both bringing food back to the nest. The birds will defend the nest and adopt a defensive pose with wings spread and tail cocked and will even peck an intruder. Sometimes they will fake injuries to lead predators away from the nest.

== Distribution ==
The spotted thick-knee is native to the grasslands and savannas of sub-Saharan Africa. Its range extends from Senegal, Mali and Mauritania in the west to Ethiopia, Kenya, Tanzania and South Africa in the east and south respectively, as well as in south Yemen in West Asia.

== Status ==
The spotted thick-knee has a very extensive range, and its population is believed to be stable. For these reasons, the IUCN has rated it as being of "Least Concern".

== Gallery ==
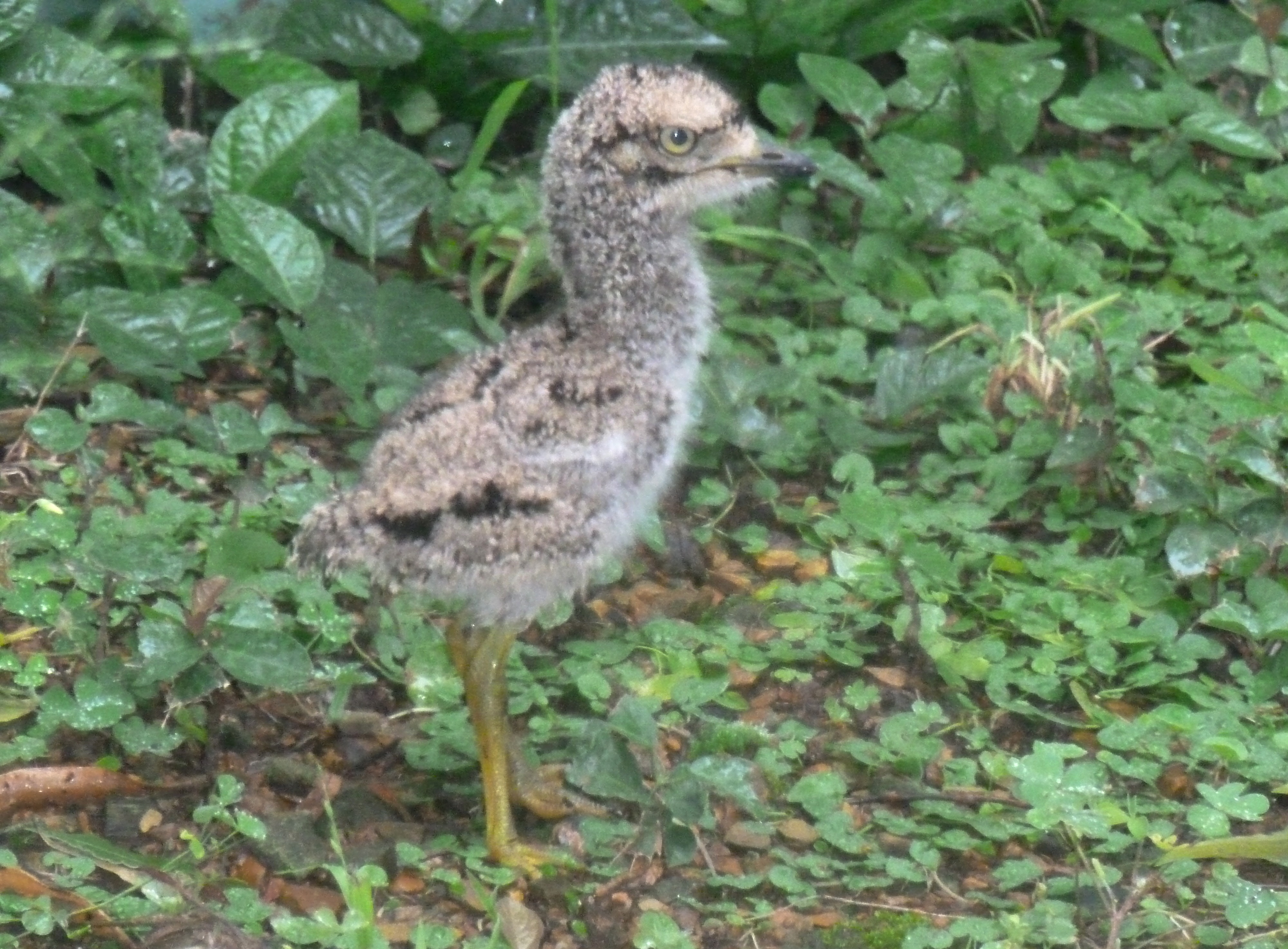
A five-day-old chick

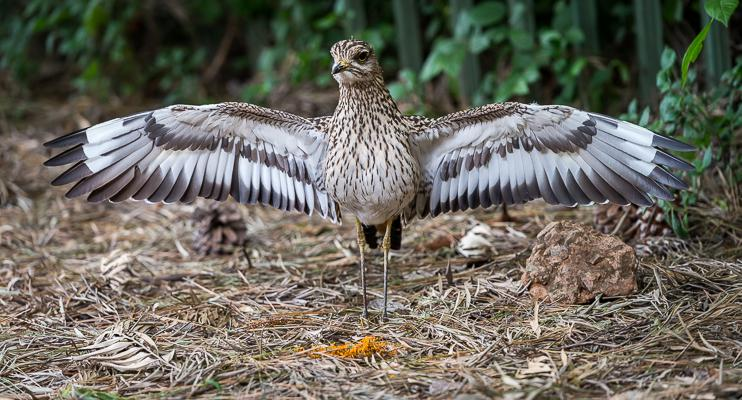
Adult's defensive pose

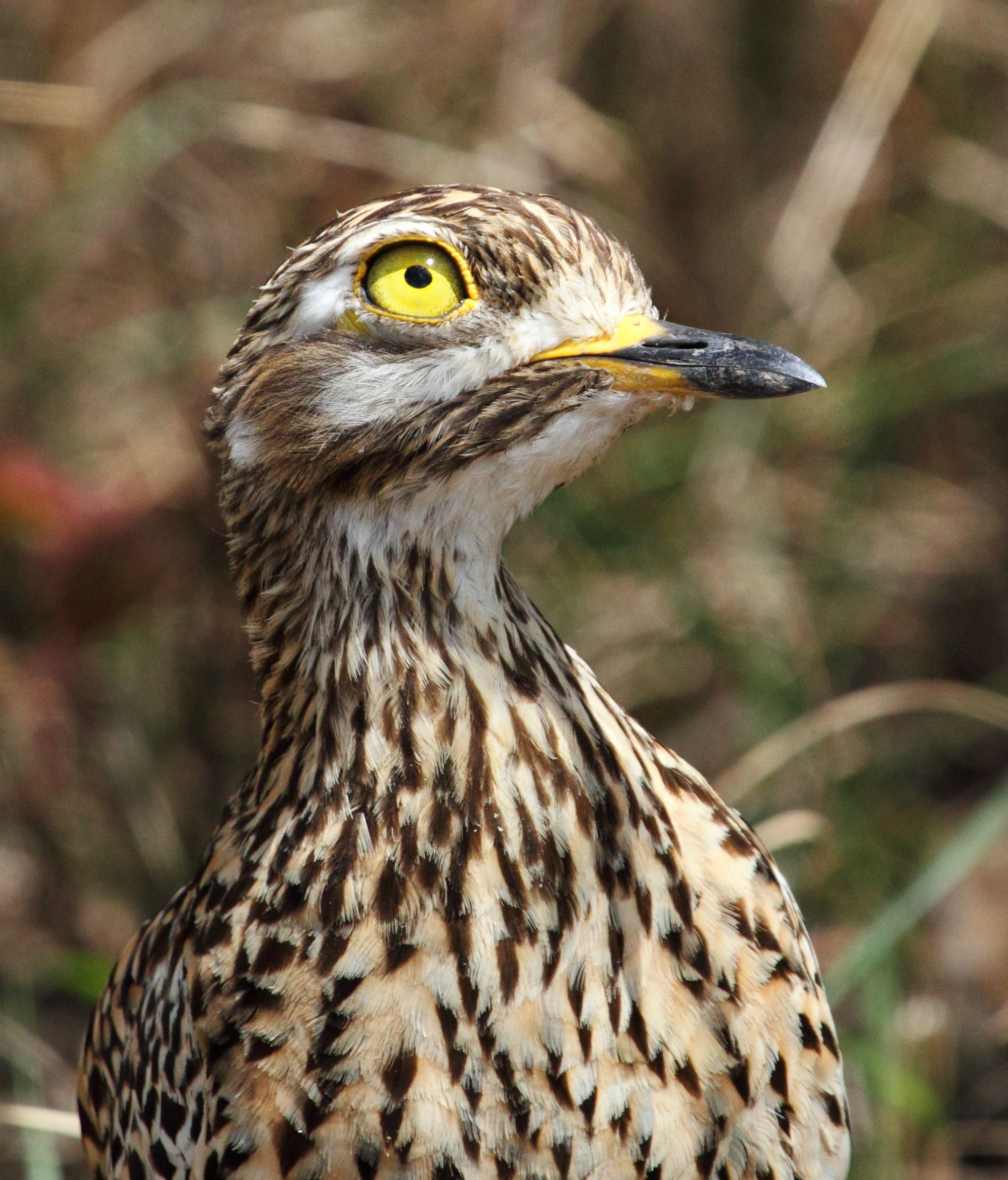
Scanning the sky for raptors

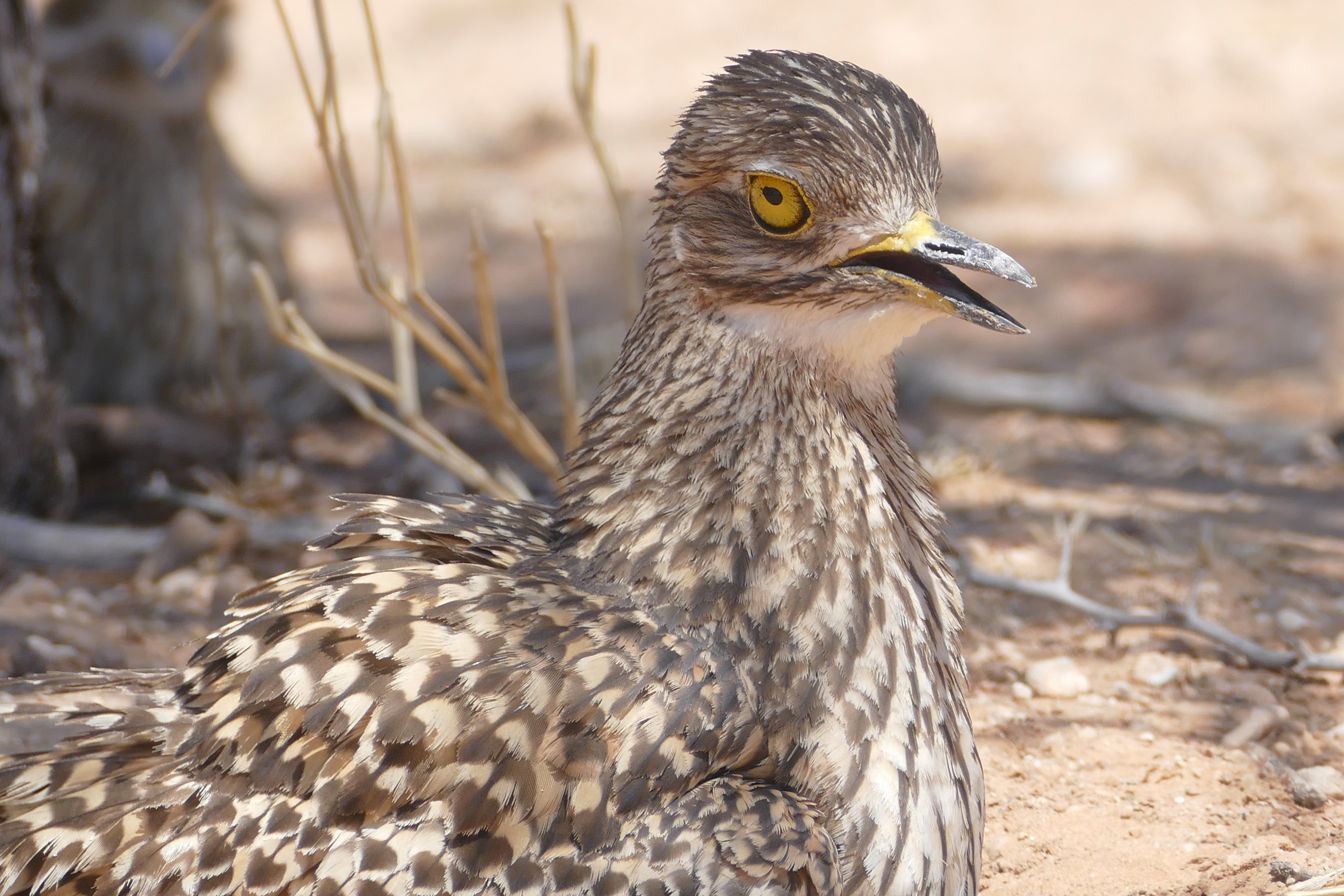
Cooling down by panting
