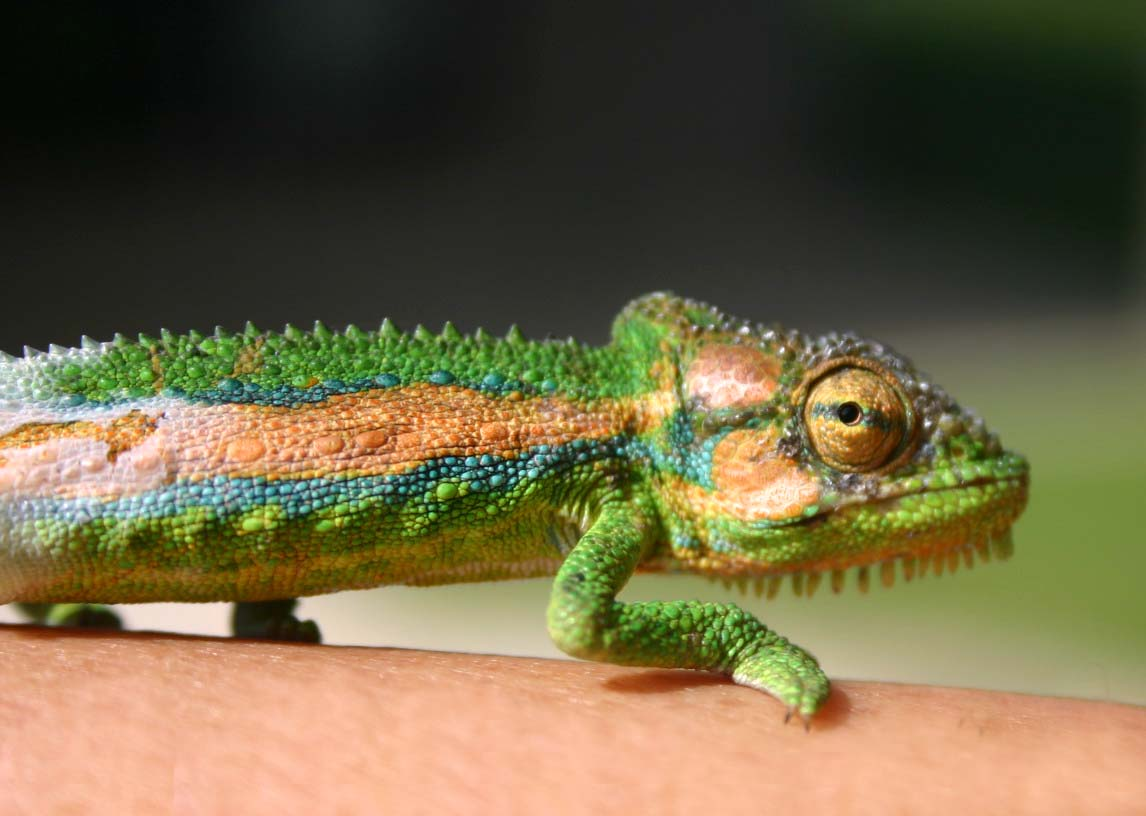
- moulting male

Conservation status
- Near Threatened (IUCN 3.1)
- CITES Appendix II

Scientific classification
- Kingdom: Animalia
- Phylum: Chordata
- Class: Reptilia
- Order: Squamata
- Suborder: Iguania
- Family: Chamaeleonidae
- Genus: Bradypodion
- Species: B. pumilum

Binomial name
- Bradypodion pumilum (Gmelin, 1789)
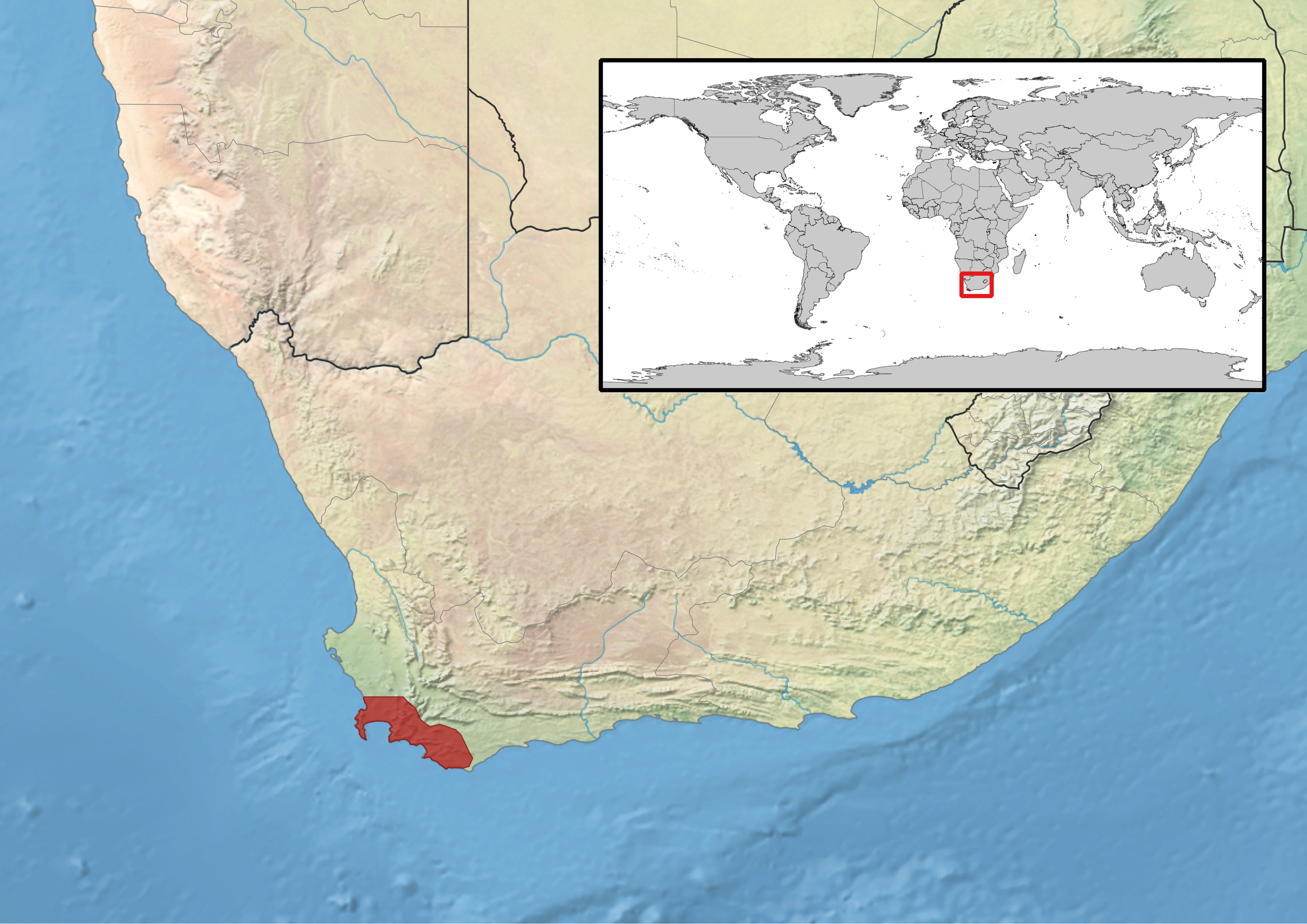

= Cape dwarf chameleon =

Species of reptile

The Cape dwarf chameleon (Bradypodion pumilum) is a chameleon native to the South African province of the Western Cape, where it is restricted to the region around Cape Town.

As with most chameleons, its tongue is twice the length of its body and it can be shot out of its mouth using a special muscle in the jaw. This gives the chameleon the ability to catch insects some distance away.

== Description ==
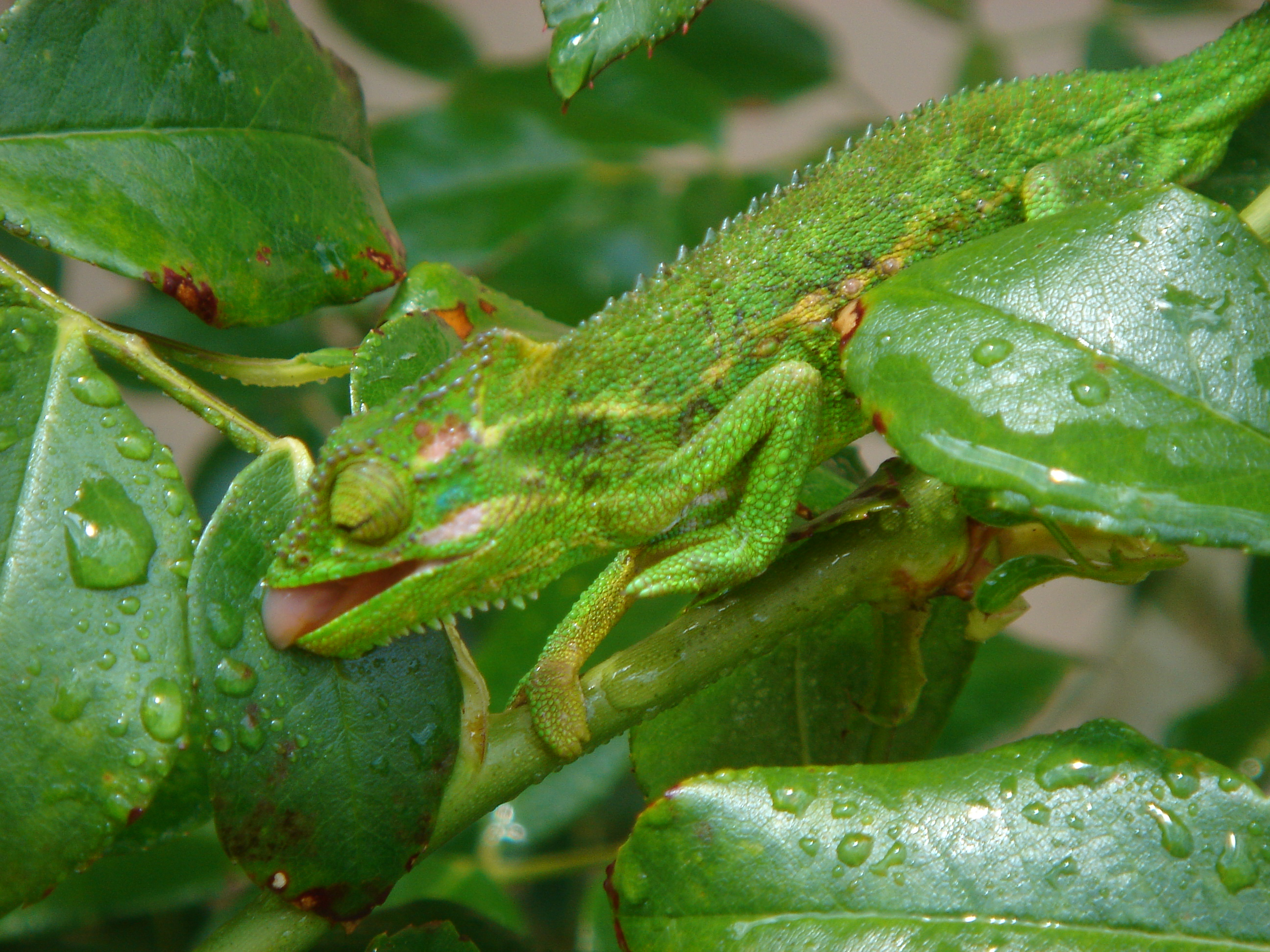
A Cape dwarf chameleon, drinking water from a rose leaf in a Cape Town garden

The Cape dwarf chameleon grows to over 15 cm (5.9 in) in length, including the tail, with males and females reaching similar adult sizes. They are ovoviviparous, but examination in controlled captivity has shown the very soft egg-like membrane around the young is discarded immediately on birth. The young resemble miniature versions of the adults, with muted colours, and typically reach no more than 2 cm in length at birth. Adults can vary quite significantly in colour variety, saturation and pattern, some appearing much more vibrant than others. Like most chameleons, the tail is prehensile, and the feet are well evolved to grasping twigs, with minute claws on the end that improve grip.

Normally very slow moving, chameleons have a characteristic shake, which may make them look more like leaves to prey and predators. When provoked, they can speed up to several centimetres a second. When further provoked, they may inflate themselves, hiss, change colour dramatically, and bite. They do not have sharp teeth, so their bites rarely inflict more than a slight pinch.

Male and female are difficult to differentiate. However males tend to have brighter colours, slightly larger head crests, and slightly narrower stomach area around the hips.

The Cape dwarf chameleon is classified as a medium-sized chameleon with an average adult body size of 50–70 mm body size. This species has a restricted distribution within regions of southwestern South Africa that receive rainfall during winter months. This species is viviparous, meaning it gives live birth rather than eggs, and can have one to several clutches of about 10-15 offspring in any given year. Mortality rates of neonates are expected to be high due to an intense reproduction schedule and a high fecundity rate.

== Functional consequences of morphological differentiation ==
Different populations within Cape dwarf chameleons were found to have different preferences regarding perch diameter. The two main populations, Kogelberg and Stellenbosch, were seen to have different behavior. Kogelberg tended to use perches that were significantly wider on average than perches used by the Stellenbosch site which chose perches by random. Hand size has a direct correlation with grip strength on both broad and narrow dowels, rod-like structures, in both populations. The longer the tail length, the greater the strength. This species prefers to sleep on perches of specific diameters that correspond to their specific morphology. Animals from habitats characterized by wider perches are also stronger than their counterparts living in habitats with narrow branches. This has led to sexual selection for chameleons with specific traits like hand size and tail length.

Bradypodion pumilum has two ecomorphs: a large, brightly coloured, ornate version often found in closed habitats, and a small, dull version with less ornamentation often found in open vegetation. Casque size is known to be used to communicate fighting ability, but it is yet to be known whether this size is an honest signal and if it is related to bite force. Bite force is significantly related to head size and the best way to tell the strength of the bite force is measuring the head width. Open habitat males tend to have larger heads thus having stronger bite force. Larger chameleons have a high casque (parietal crest) and are brightly coloured with pink patches on their flank. The smaller chameleons found in open habitats have reduced casques and lack flank colour patches at all. Battles between males can lead to severe injuries through biting.

== Taxonomy ==
In the past, most South African dwarf chameleons were considered a subspecies of the Cape species This is now known to be wrong, however; B. pumilum does not appear to have any particularly close living relatives. Like the Knysna dwarf chameleon, it seems to be a basal offshoot of the ancestral stock, which gave rise to all Bradypodion species.

== Structure and movement ==
Cape dwarf chameleons have a much higher survival rate in a metropolitan area if they are bigger in size. Their survival rate was dependent on body size, and the larger the size, the greater the chance that the individual would survive a ten-day period. Larger, older chameleons tend to be more sedentary compared to the smaller younger ones which means that the larger ones likely have smaller home ranges. Smaller chameleons inhabit grasses while larger chameleons are found mainly in bushes and trees. This is territorial, because it is believed that larger males would cannibalize smaller ones intruding on their territory. An alternative thought is that the smaller chameleons simply do not have big enough limbs to grasp larger branches correctly. When fighting contests occur, the outcome is influenced by the height of the ornamental casque, the relative size of the pink patch in the center of the flank, and previous experience. The ornamental casque is the protruding head piece of the chameleon, usually with a rounded end. The height of this piece is an honest signal to other male chameleons representing its total size. Similarly with the pink patch in the center of the flank, this is an honest signal showing that the chameleon has a healthy diet correlating to the strength of the individual. The turnover rate in males is thought to be higher than females.

When it comes to foraging, males and juveniles are more active than females. Females are only equally or more active than males during the reproductive season. Males may be more active due to seeking mates and defending territories. Bradypodion pumilum is a sit-and-wait forager which means they will rarely move and wait for prey to cross their paths, only then striking out. Low rates of prey capture are often seen in this species.

== Distribution ==
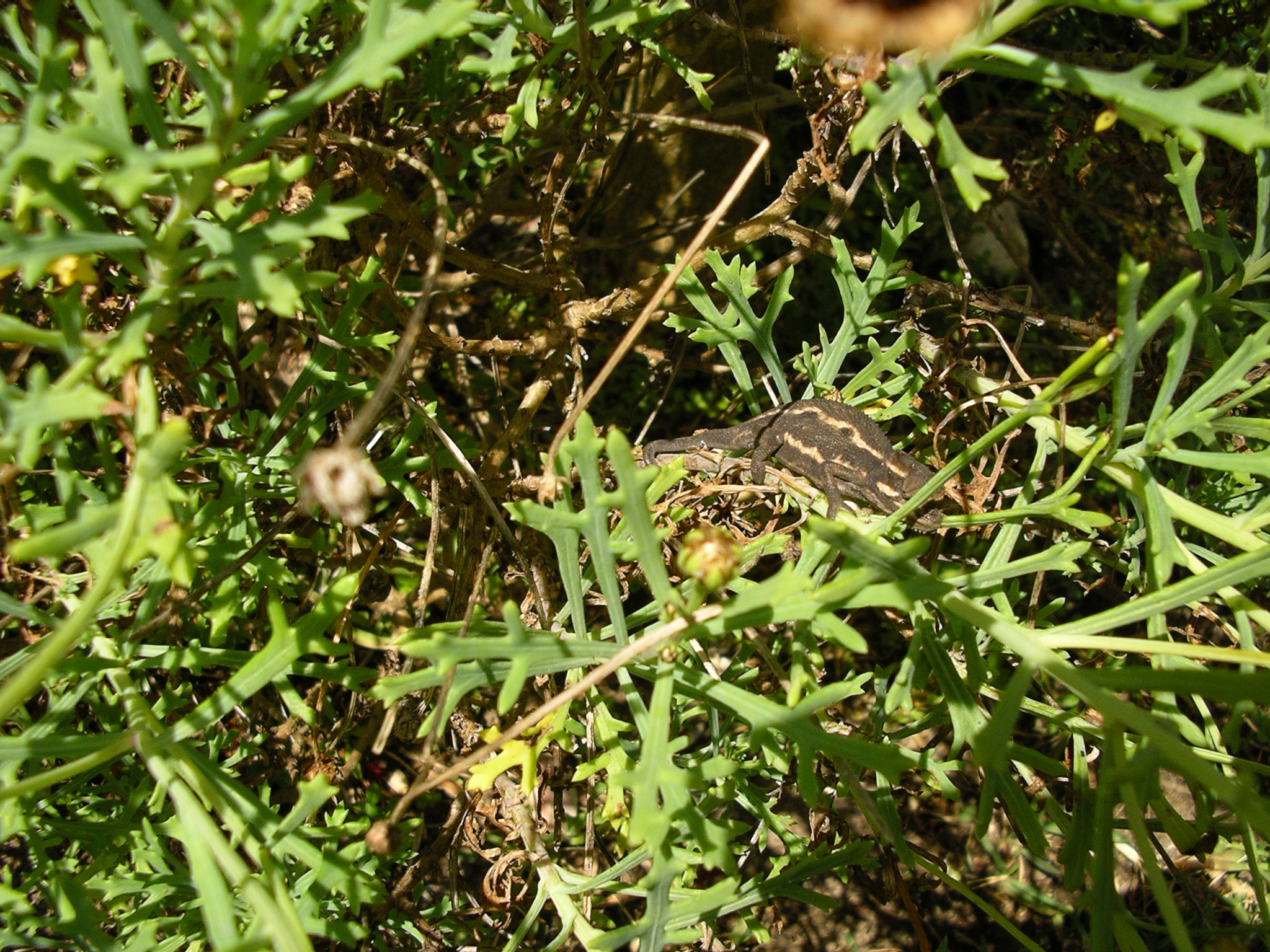
Cape dwarf chameleon in its preferred type of vegetation - dense, fine and thin.

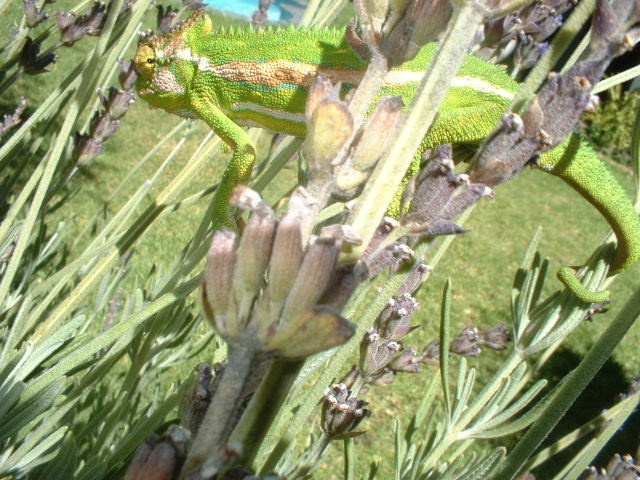
Cape dwarf chameleon in garden habitat

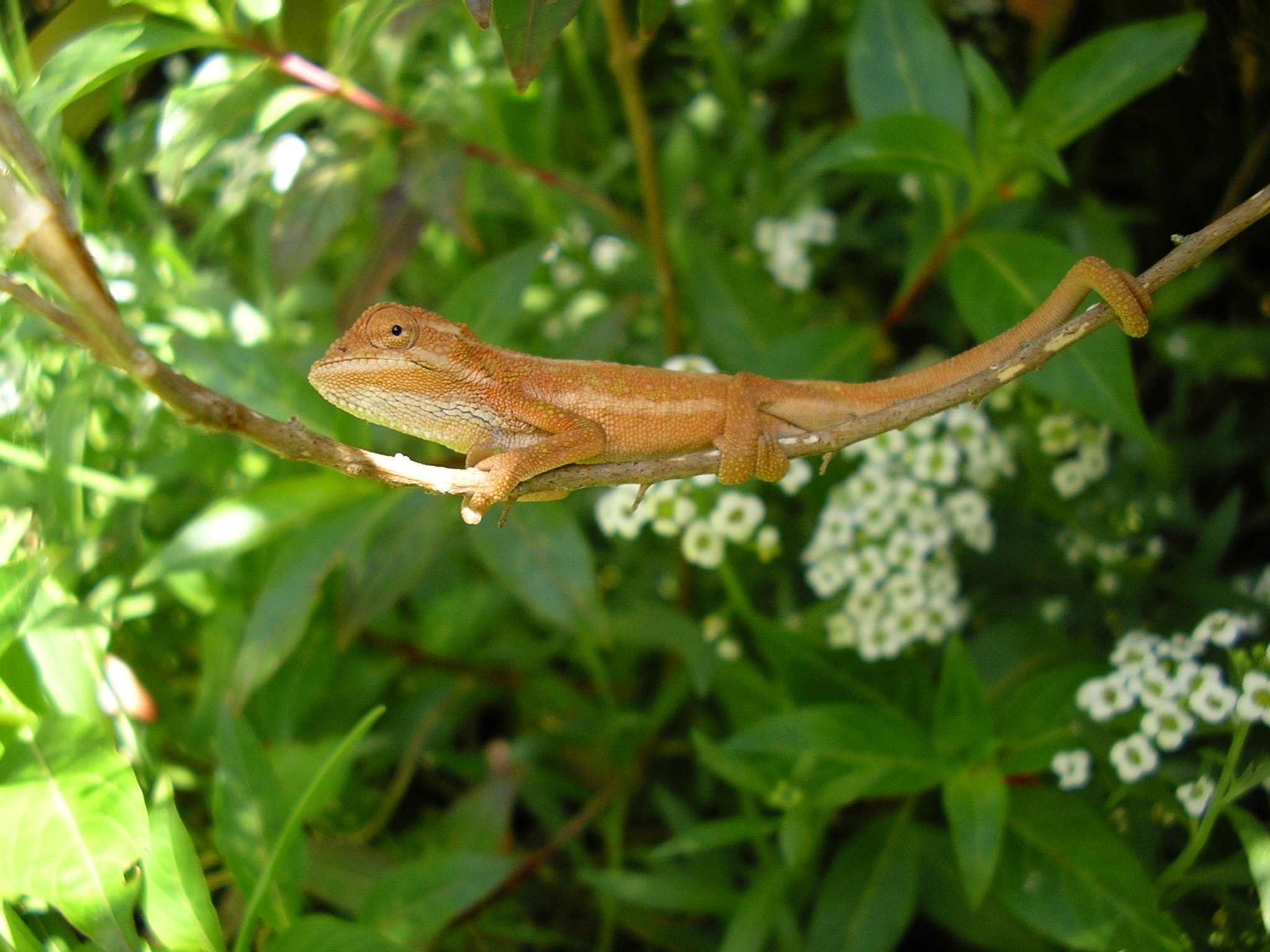
Baby Cape dwarf chameleon in garden habitat

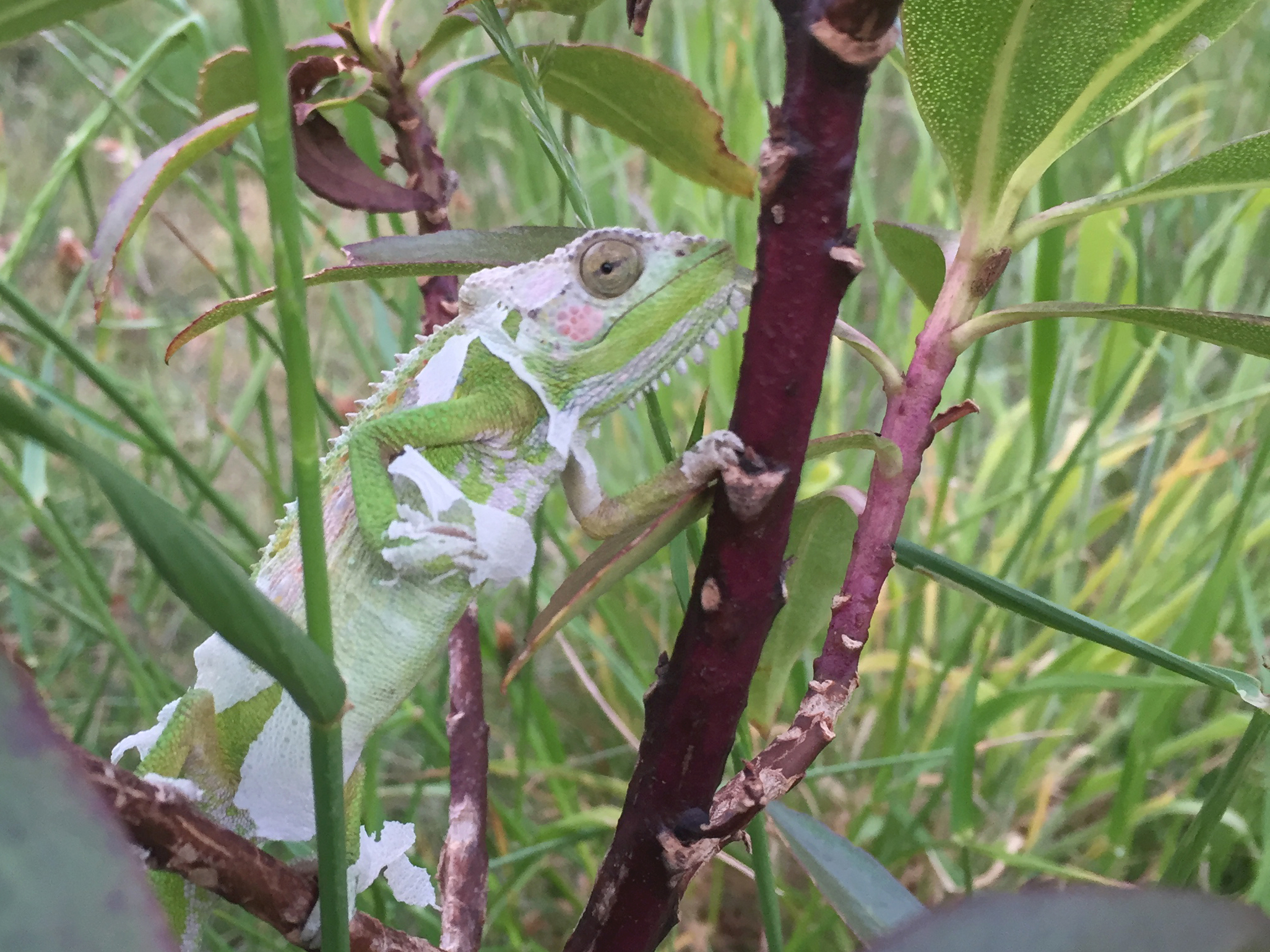
Moulting Cape dwarf chameleon

The Cape dwarf chameleon is restricted to the area around Cape Town, the Boland, and the mountainous coastline as far as Agulhas.

Like many other reptiles, chameleons are poikilotherms meaning their body temperature is completely dependent on environmental temperature. A large number of lizards are expected to be affected by climate change in the near future, especially in Southern Africa where this species is found. If temperatures rise by 1-3 degrees Celsius, then it is expected that Cape dwarf chameleon running speed will increase as well. Although speed would be better, bite and grip force would become worse. Chameleons are adapted to current habitat temperatures and conditions, but shifting to a higher temperature would actually benefit some of their traits and abilities. This shows that future persistence of this species is very likely even with the advancement of global warming.

== Habitat ==
=== Habitat in wilderness areas ===
This species inhabits a range of different habitats and vegetation types, from fynbos and renosterveld, to indigenous Afrotemperate forest and wetlands.

It is less common in extremely fire-prone and low-growing fynbos, and in open sandy or rocky areas. It is more usually found in areas such as river valleys, which are sheltered to some degree from the region's seasonal fires, and where more dense vegetation has developed. It prefers certain plant species to reside on too, especially favouring Restios. This adaptable species has also diversified into different forms and colours, depending on their habitat. Those that live in open, low-lying fynbos vegetation tend to be smaller and dull-coloured with smaller crests. Those in denser, closed vegetation areas tend to be larger and brightly coloured, with a longer tail and larger casque.

In the wild, its predators are mainly snakes and predatory birds such as fiscal shrikes.

=== Habitat structure differences ===
When looking at open habitats, chameleons with smaller body sizes are favored. Differences between habitats include certain traits found in the chameleons. This includes limbs, feet, tail, and head width. Open habitats commonly see longer limbs but smaller feet compared to chameleons found in closed habitats. Smaller feet in the open habitat are more accustomed to grasping the narrower branches. Natural and sexual selection in open and closed habitats have different intensities which directly affects the morphological variation found within the species.

=== Habitat loss ===
The Cape dwarf chameleon is currently experiencing habitat loss and fragmentation of its natural habitat through causes such as urbanization and agriculture. The historical habitat of Bradypodion pumilum has recently become severely fragmented due to intense urbanization and agricultural transformation. This trend is continuing with approximately 6.5 square kilometers of undeveloped land becoming lost to transformation in the Cape Town municipal area per year. Additional losses are expected to occur because of rapid climatic changes near Cape Town which is where the species is primarily distributed. In urban areas, Cape dwarf chameleons are limited to planted vegetation, usually nonindigenous species, and patches of highly disturbed habitat. Populations are often found living in the overgrowth of exotic vegetation on road verges, abandoned urban ground, riverine thickets, or residential areas. Part of the species distribution lies in habitats that are protected by provincial parks, national parks, and private reserves. This protected area only amounts to 40% of the total area of occupancy. Most of the shrubland found in these protected areas is fire-prone, and natural fires are known to be detrimental to dwarf chameleon populations.

=== Habitat in urban areas ===
With much of their former habitat now covered in suburbs, this little species has shown itself partially adaptable to suburban gardens. They can serve as a natural insect control for gardens. However, not all gardens are suitable.

==== Urban habitat requirements ====
Chameleons survive only in sunny gardens with much varied bushy vegetation.

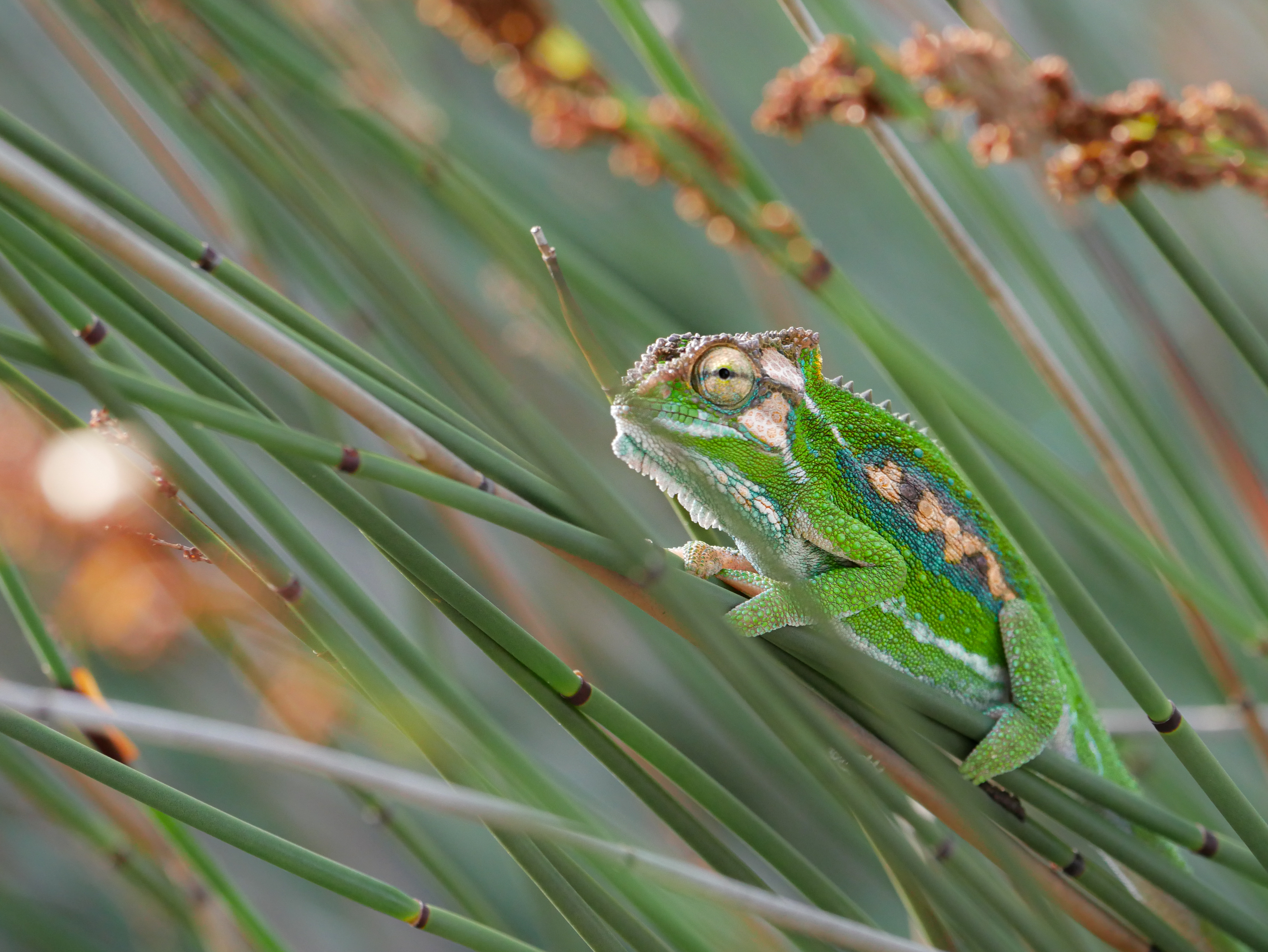
Cape dwarf chameleon sits in urban Cape thatching reed in southern Cape Town.

Direct sunlight is a prerequisite for cold-blooded reptiles like chameleons. Chameleons also require vegetation for a habitat—preferably with foliage they can easily grasp with their small claws, and perch on. Therefore, most suitable are bushes and small trees with some fine foliage or thin twigs for climbing. Favoured local shrub species include: Restio reeds, daisy bushes, Leonotis bushes, Cape Honeysuckle, Plumbago, Bitou bushes, Psoralea pinnata and many others. Favoured trees are those which provide low and accessible foliage, such as Karee trees, Willows, Pepper trees, Virgilia and others.

Terrains with no suitable habitat include lawns, paved areas, brickwork, or higher trees with trunks too wide for chameleons to climb. Foliage should also not be pruned or trimmed, or exposed to insecticide poisons, as this usually kills or injures chameleons.

Chameleons naturally wander and, in suburbs with smaller gardens, they also avoid properties that don't connect to larger "green corridors" that join several properties.

==== Urban threats ====
In urban areas, its predators are mainly domestic cats. Cats are a non-native, introduced predator that chameleons are defenceless against. More importantly, the growing density of cats kept in suburban areas causes an unnaturally high ratio of predators to prey, leading to the collapse of populations of chameleons and many other species. Other predators include a range of urban and introduced bird species such as crows.

Certain gardening practices such as using insecticides or hedge trimmers can also kill off urban populations. Garden clearing removes habitat, especially when greenery is replaced with paving, brickwork or lawns. Occasionally chameleons are also known to transported on garden waste, to waste disposal sites.

== Behaviour ==
People often think chameleons change their colour for camouflage so to blend into the environment, but this is not the full truth. They can make small adjustments for camouflage; but chameleons mostly change colour as a way of expressing mood and communicating as well as to thermoregulate. Turning a darker colour to absorb more heat or very pale pastel colours to reflect light and absorb less heat.

Courtship involves small, quick head twitches by the male, who exhibits brighter courtship colours. If the female rejects the male's advances, she assumes a much darker colour, sway from side to side, and often opens her mouth threateningly. Darker colours are often associated with stress, and lighter colours with relaxation or sleep.

During the night, the species tends to move higher, to the tips of branches (nocturnal predators are primarily terrestrial) and assume a white colour when they sleep. During the day they spend more time lower down in denser vegetation (daytime predators include several species of birds).

They feed primarily on small insects and other arthropods. They drink by licking dew or rain drops from leaves or other surfaces.

== Special cases ==
The taxonomy of Bradypodion is based largely on morphological characteristics. There is a lack of a comprehensive assessment of sexual ontogenetic and population variation of these characters. Some common characters used to define Bradypodion species is casque development, scale shape and size in crests, lateral tubercles, and others.

== Chameleons in captivity ==
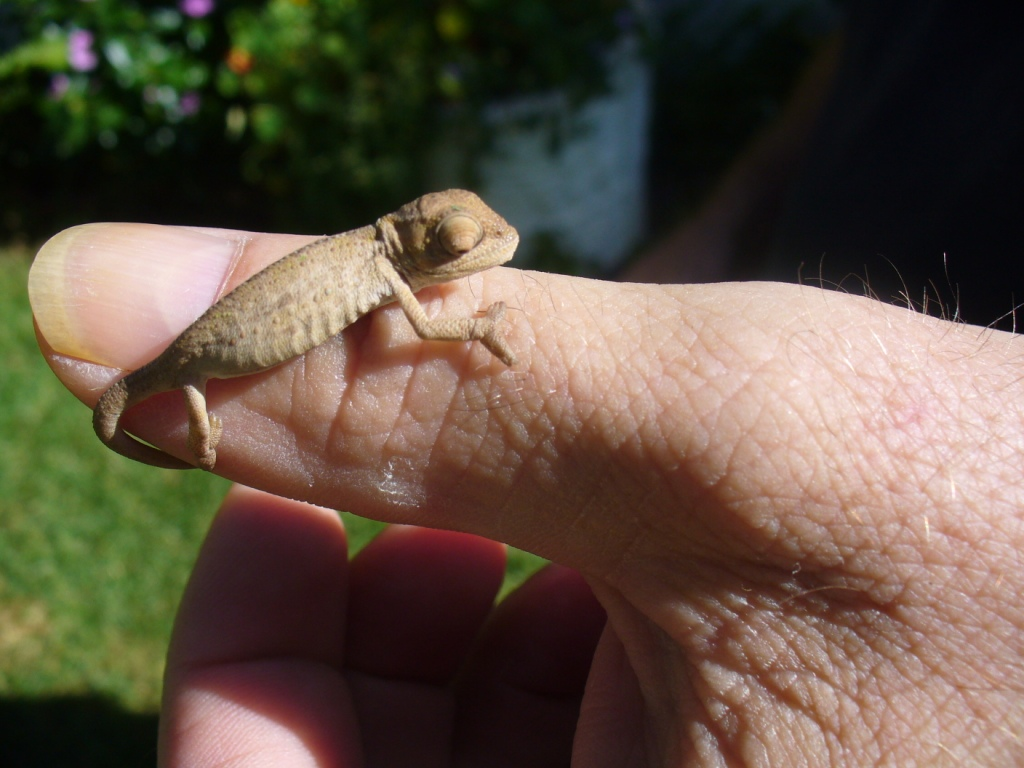
Juvenile Cape dwarf chameleon

While it is not normally legal to keep these chameleons, it is possible to obtain special permission from the South African government to do so. These chameleons are better admired than handled. However, taming is possible through gentle and consistent (almost daily) contact, allowing trust to build up. This is typically achieved through careful and slow hand-based feeding of flies, small spiders, grasshoppers, etc. In cold weather, a sensitively handled B. pumilum commonly becomes eager to perch on a human hand for the warmth. To maintain them out of their natural environment requires advanced skills and is a demanding project; they require the right amount and type of ultraviolet exposure and large supplies of specific types of live food that are not easy to supply. They also require moisture, even just tap water sprayed gently onto the foliage with a hose.

In most urban environments, the amount of naturally occurring suitable insect food is insufficient. They should remain outdoors where they are able to regulate their own body temperatures using sunlight (like most reptiles, they die if deprived of, or overexposed to the sun).

Cat owners should be aware that domestic cats are introduced predators, and usually kill all chameleons in the immediate area. Consequently, one should not bring chameleons into a garden frequented by cats. It also is important to be cautious of the activity of shrikes, in particular the southern fiscal, which, if they get into the chameleon-hunting habit, will rapidly strip a garden.
