= Newlands Forest =

Conservancy area in Cape Town, South Africa

Coordinates: 33°58′15″S 18°26′30″E

Entrance to Newlands Forest.

Newlands Forest is a conservancy area on the eastern slopes of Table Mountain, beside the suburb of Newlands, Cape Town, South Africa. It is owned and maintained by the Table Mountain National Parks Board, along with the City Parks Department of Cape Town, and includes a Fire Station, Nursery and Reservoir.

The forest itself is a popular walking and jogging destination (See trail map below), close and easily accessible from the city's southern suburbs. Due to its location on the mountain slopes, there are impressive views eastward over the Cape Flats.

== Fauna and Flora ==
Newlands Forest lies at a natural transition zone between endangered Granite Fynbos and Peninsula Shale Fynbos, in an area that also originally supported large indigenous forests.

In the late 1800s, much of the indigenous forests were felled, and the fynbos cleared, to make way for commercial pine plantations, which still remain and account for the remainder of the land.

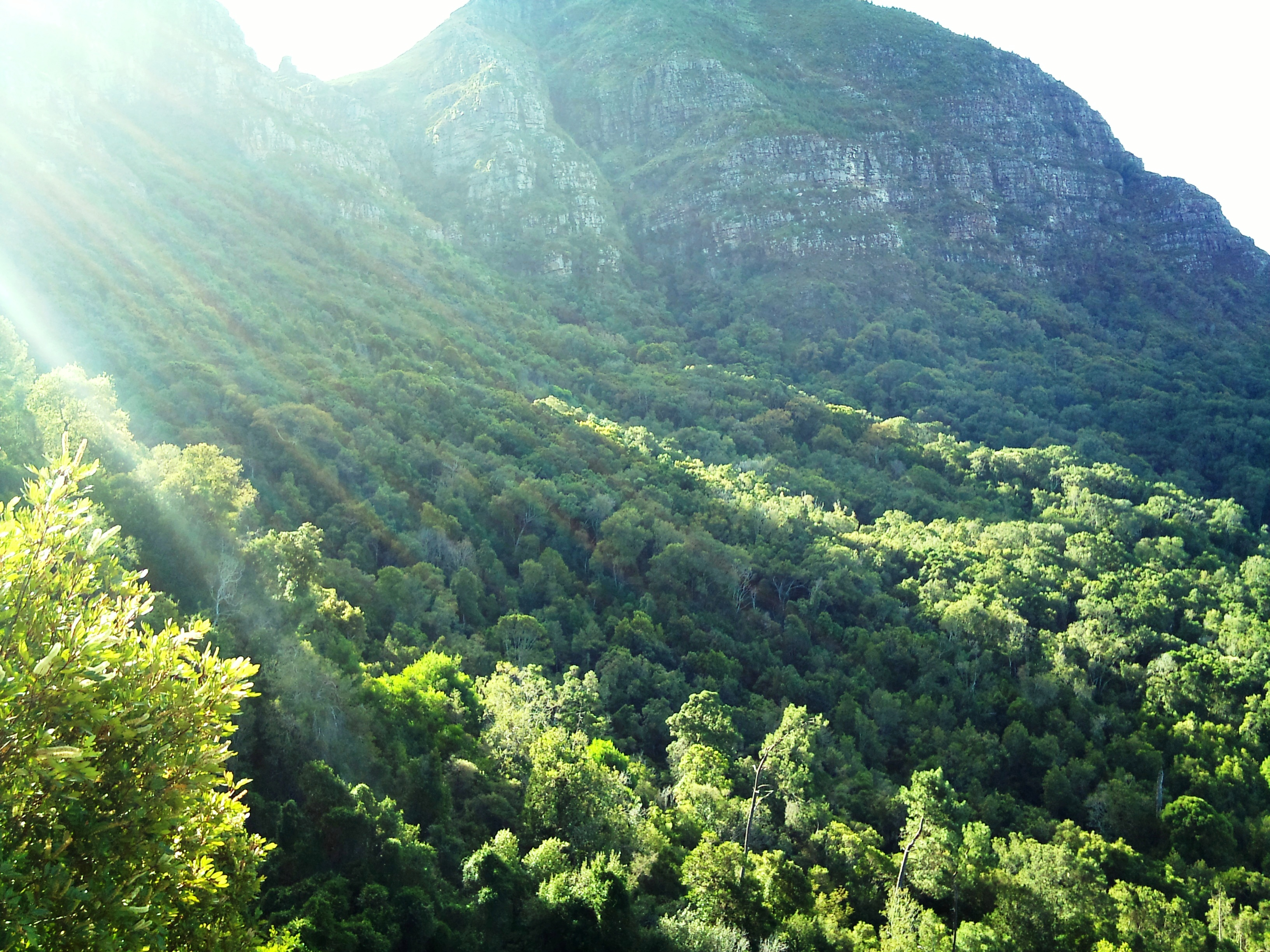
Newlands Forest, the indigenous forests of the upper slopes viewed from the south

=== Peninsula Granite Fynbos ===
This is an endangered vegetation type, which can still be found on the southern edges of Newlands Forest. This ecosystem is endemic to the city of Cape Town and occurs nowhere else in the world. Existing only on the Cape Granite Formation, it naturally assumes the form of medium-dense tree vegetation, dominated by a variety of Protea and daisy species. The striking and iconic Silvertree grows in this vegetation type and a small population of these massive proteas can still be seen at Newlands forest. Historically this ecosystem supported a great many wild animals and there are at least 9 plant species which occur nowhere else in the world.
This vegetation is severely threatened, mainly by invasive alien plants. A total of 13 of this ecosystem's plant species are classed as endangered, two of them critically. One local species, the Wynberg Conebush, is now extinct.

List of endemic species
- Leucadendron grandiflorum (The Wynberg Conebush, a tall protea that is now extinct)
- Hermannia micrantha (Small-flowered Dolls Rose, a flowering shrub)
- Gnidia parvula (Small-flowered Saffron Bush, a low shrub)
- Cliffortia carinata (Crown Climbers Friend)
- Polycarena silenoides (Granite Cape Flax, a small herb)
- Erepsia patula (The Spreading Ever-fig, a succulent shrub)
- Lampranthus curvifolius (Bakoven Brightfig, succulent)
- Aristea pauciflora (The Unistem Aristea, a geophytic herb)
- Willdenowia affinis (The Table Mountain Window Reed, a graminoid)
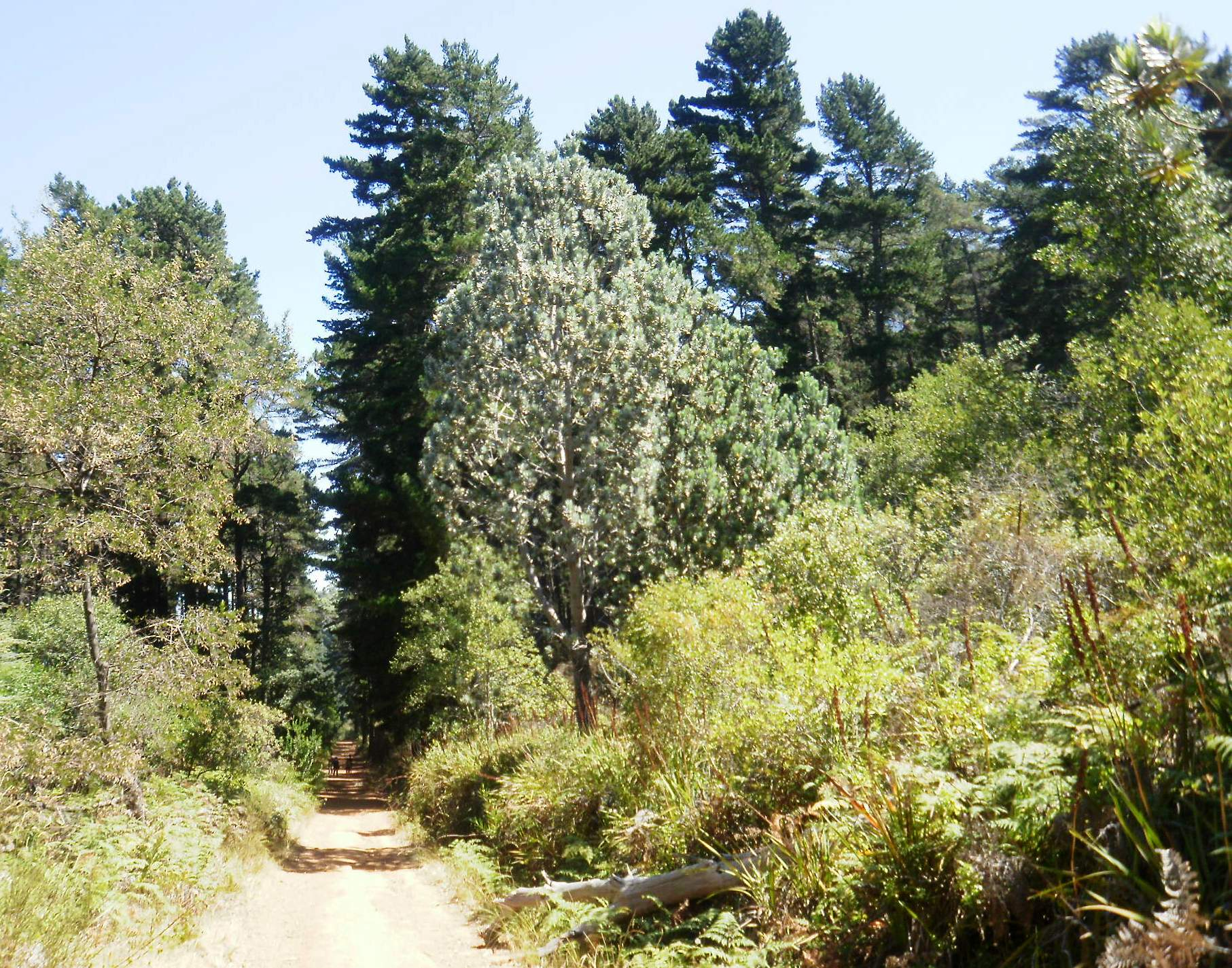

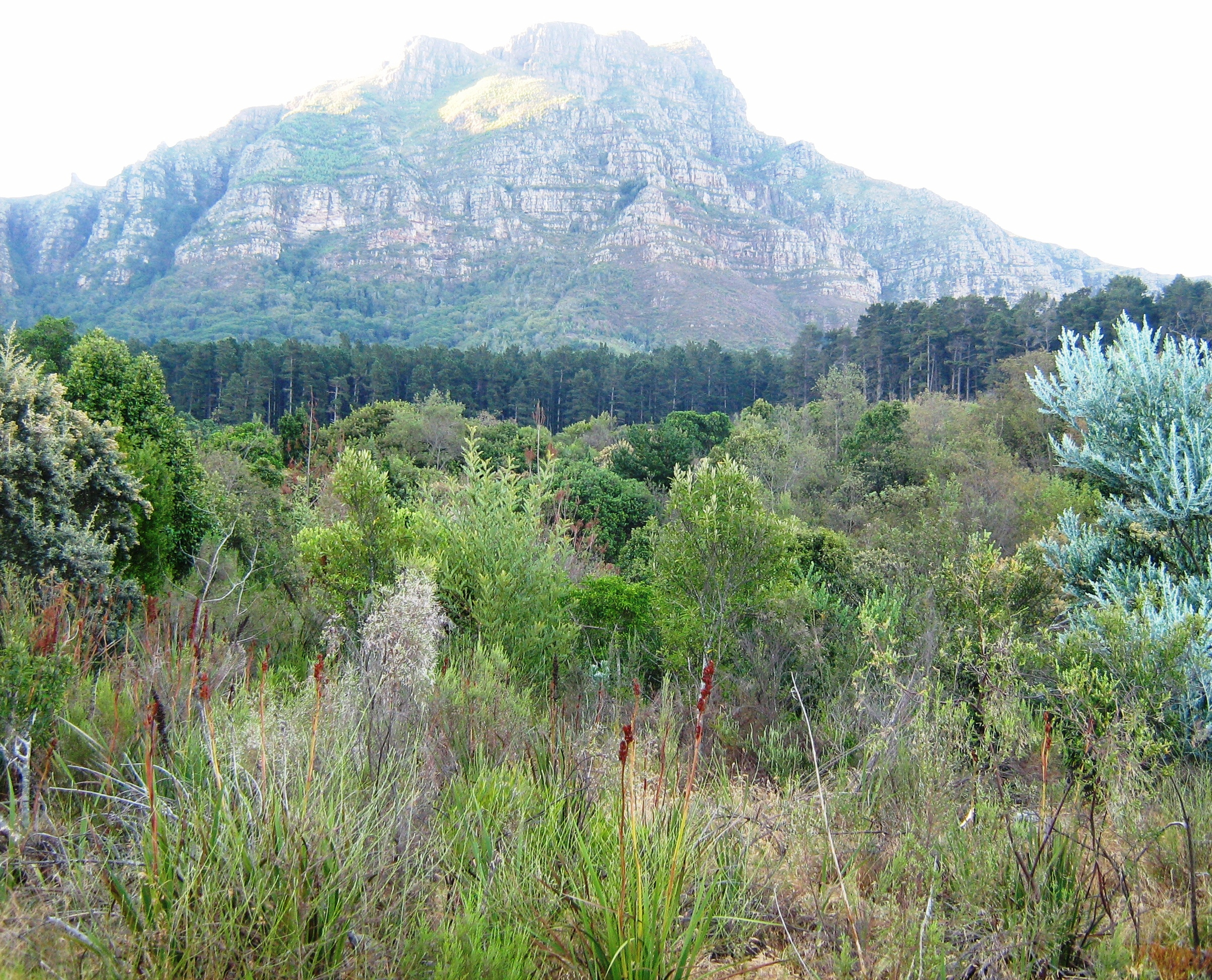

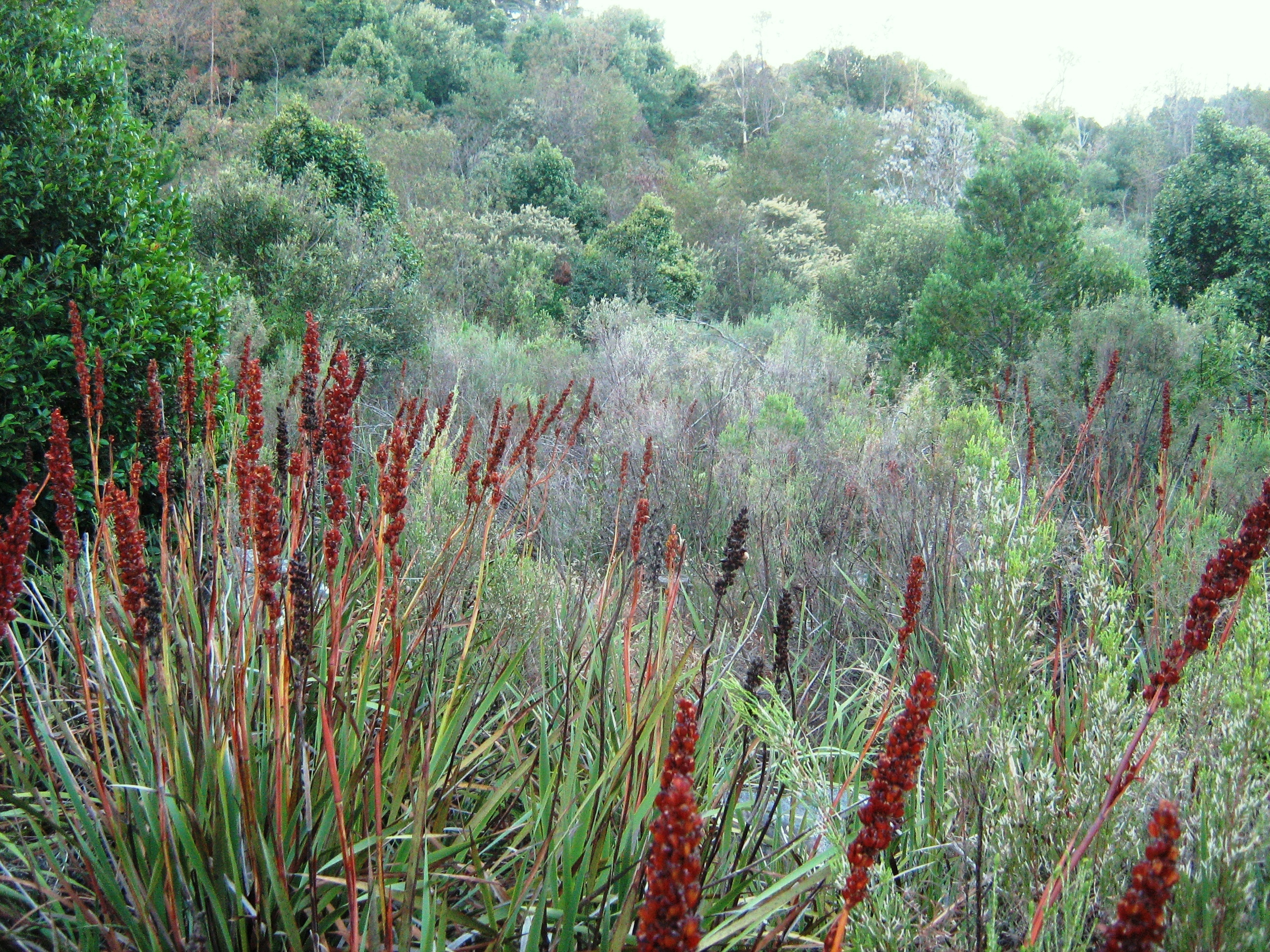

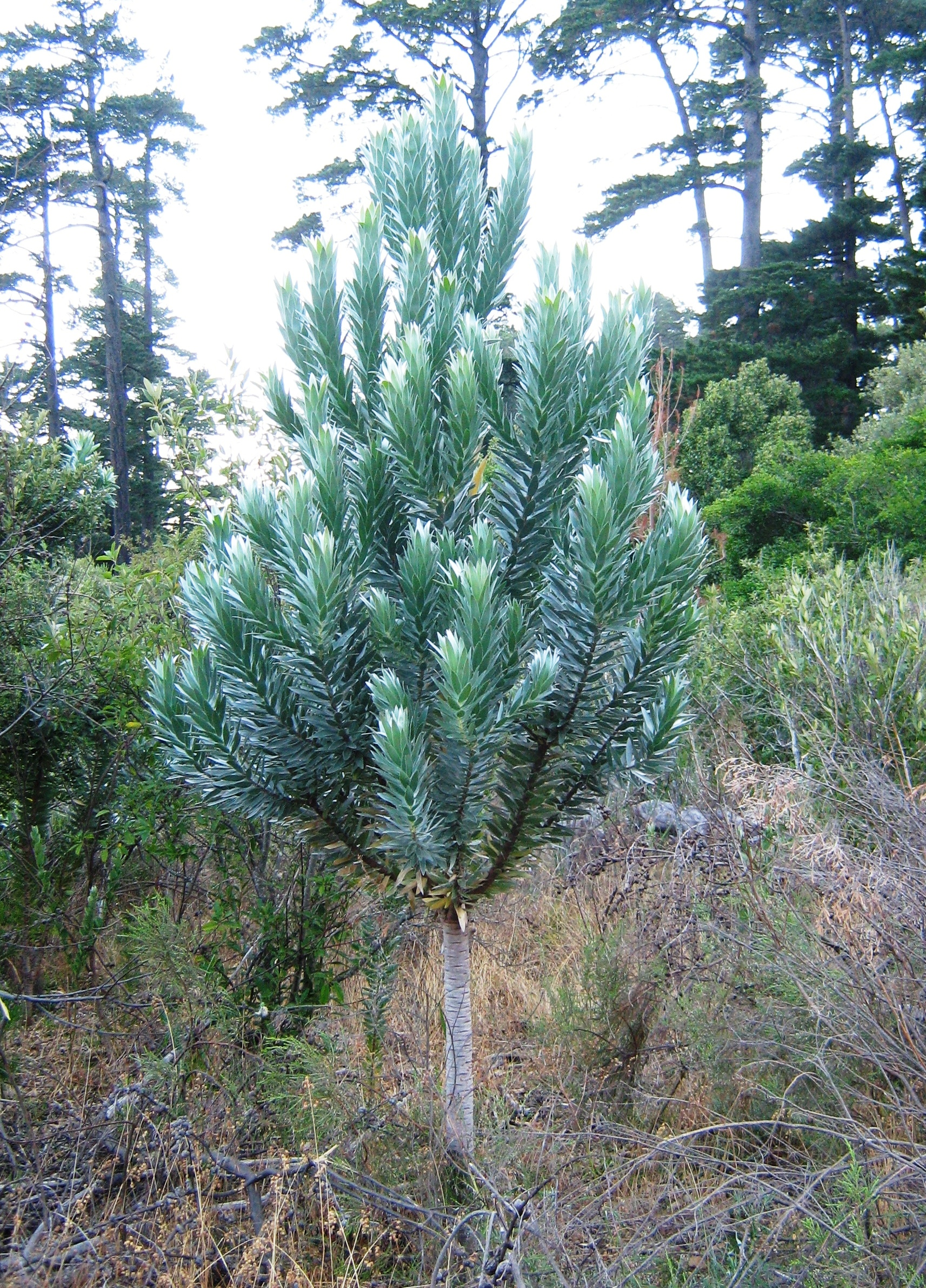

=== Peninsula Shale Fynbos ===
This is actually a type of Cape Winelands Shale Fynbos, which is mainly found far to the east of Cape Town in the "Boland" region. The patch that occurs around Newlands Forest is a natural outlier, isolated in the middle of Cape Town.
The soils are naturally poor and slightly acidic but the biodiversity is incredibly rich. The vegetation consists of a diverse array of Protea, Erica, geophyte and daisy species, as well as some endemic species. In the moister areas, the Ericas predominate over the other plant groups. Along with the Granite Fynbos, this is by far the most diverse and richest in species of the ecosystems at Newlands Forest. As it typically grows on lower mountain slopes, which tend to be developed for housing or cultivated for farming, this vegetation is incredibly vulnerable. A total of 23 of this ecosystem's plant species are officially threatened, 7 of which are classified as endangered.

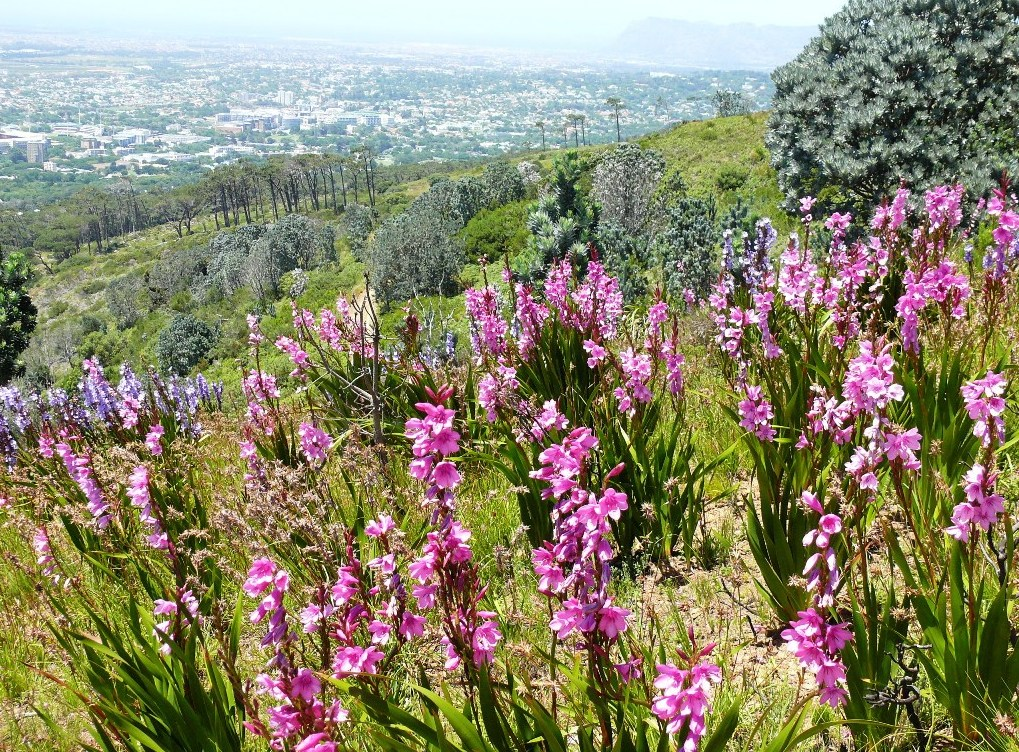

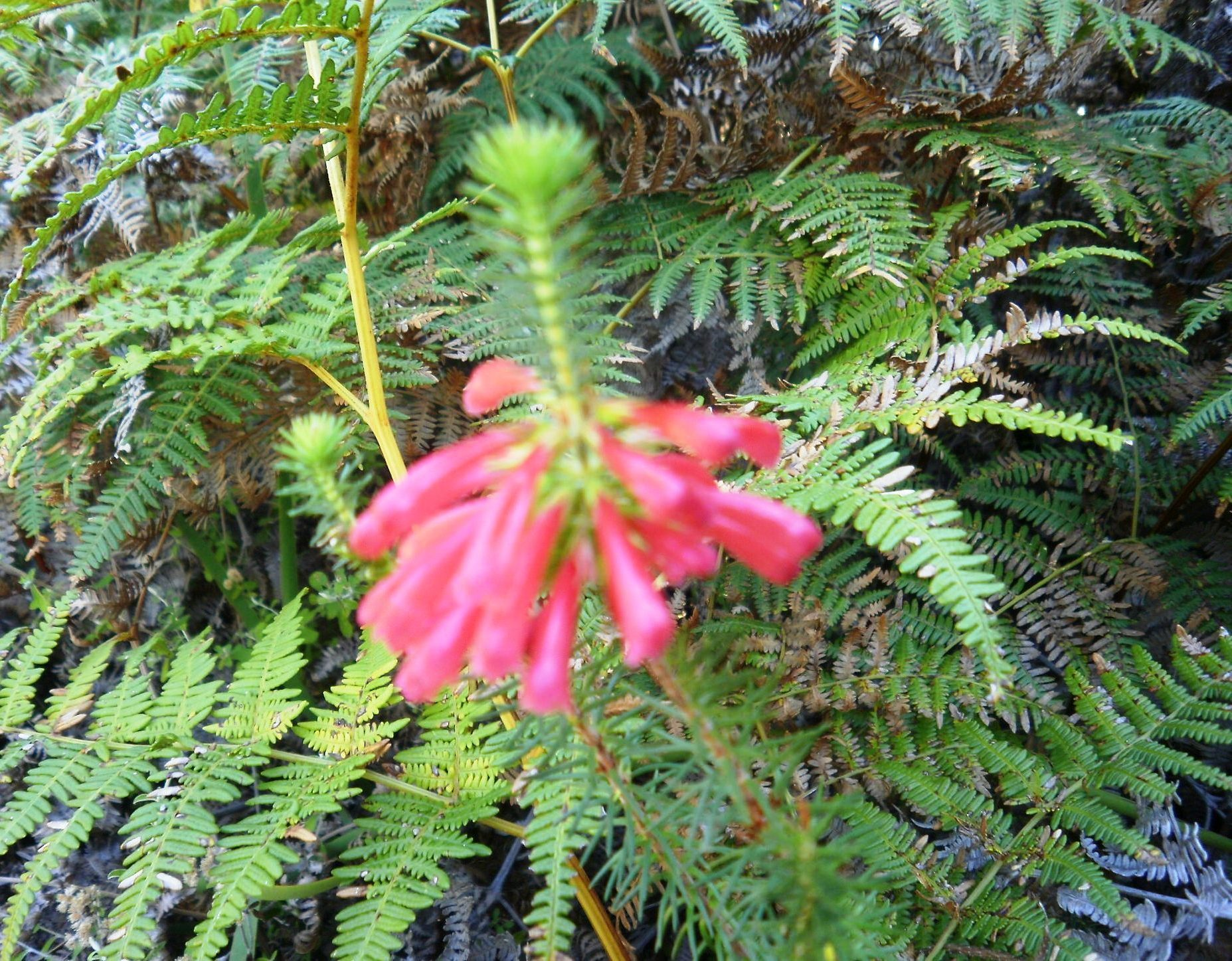

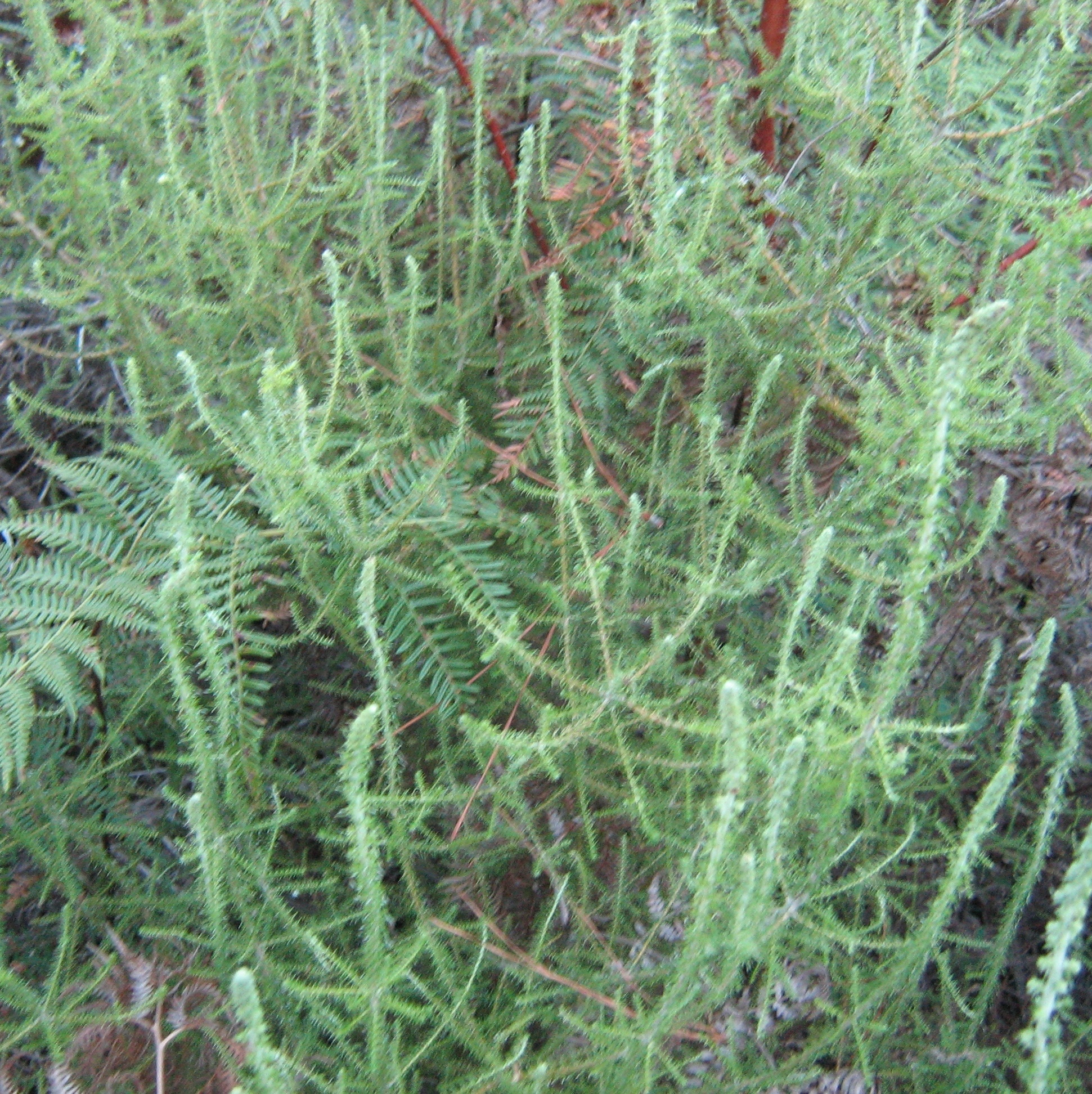

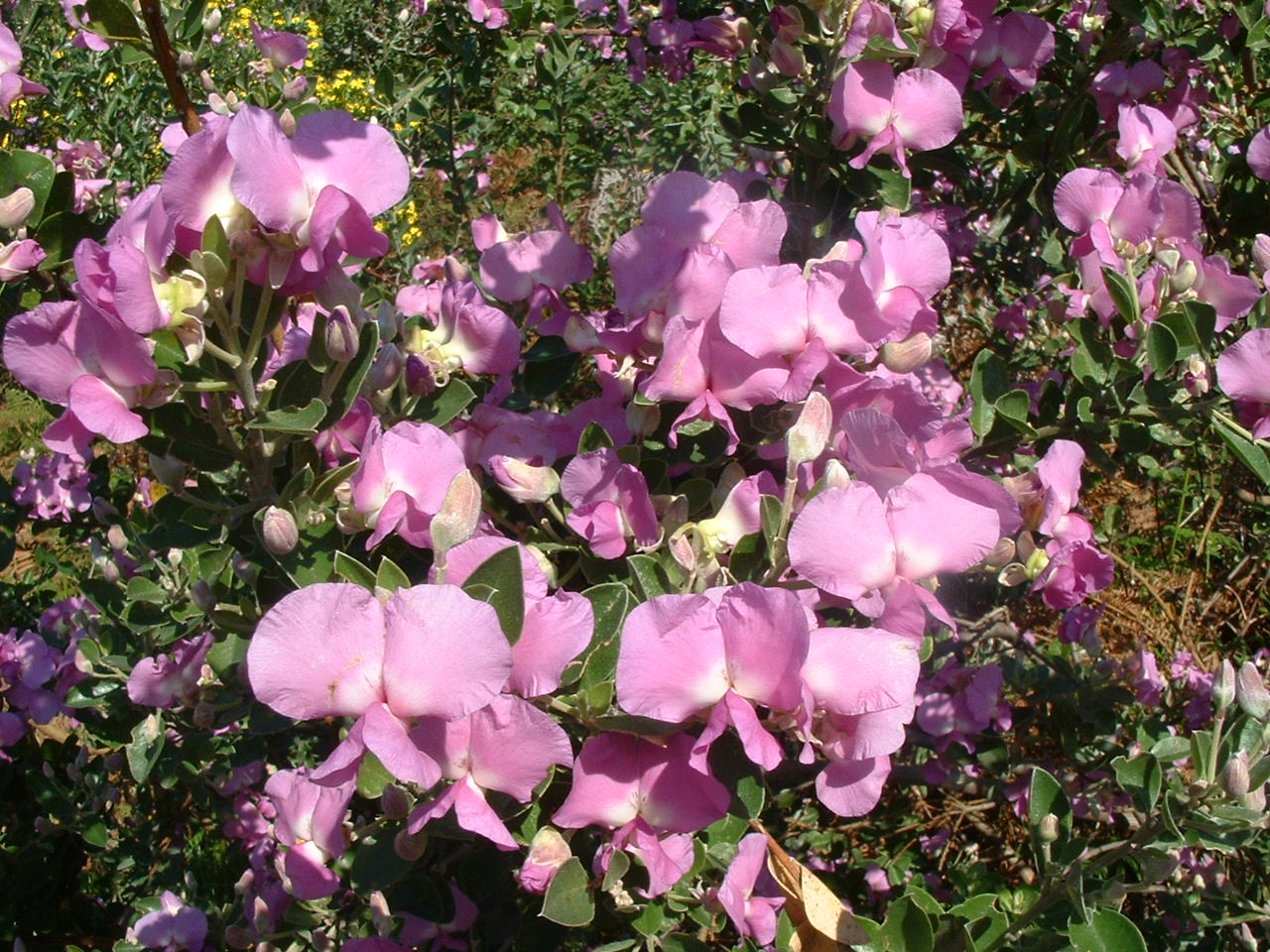

=== Indigenous Afrotemperate Forest ===
Newlands Forest lies in an area that used to naturally support large, dense, shady indigenous forests.
Such forests proliferated on the Cape Peninsula in areas that were partially or totally protected from seasonal fires. Wherever fires are naturally more frequent, the forests give way to various types of fynbos. However, the streams and kloofs of Newlands ensure that fires are relatively infrequent here. Several patches of indigenous forest survive at Newlands, mostly higher up the mountainside where historically they were safer from logging.
Mature examples of this forest are dominated by several species of massive tree which compose the tallest canopy; smaller trees which form lower layers of foliage; and a variety of ferns, herbs, bushes, bulbs, vines and lianas (e.g. Asparagus scandens, Rhoicissus tomentosa). Though not as rich in biodiversity as the various types of Cape Fynbos, these woodlands still contain a wide variety of plants and animals, some of which occur nowhere else in the world. The Newlands Forest Nursery is engaged in a project to grow indigenous trees and plant them out, with the aim of eventually rehabilitating the original forests.
The major threats come from invasive alien plants such as Australian Cheesewood, Bugweed, Black Wattle, Lantana, Privet and Pine trees. Indigenous afrotemperate forests such as those at Newlands have a significant socio-economic value, due to their use for recreation such as hiking, their role in preserving the Western Cape's water supply, and their natural production of an enormous range of medicinal plants.

Indigenous tree species
- Podocarpus falcatus (Outeniqua Yellowwood)
- Podocarpus latifolius (Real Yellowwood)
- Apodytes dimidiata (White Pear)
- Brabejum stellatifolium (Cape Wild Almond)
- Buddleja saligna (False Olive)
- Celtis africana (White Stinkwood)
- Chionanthus foveolatus (Pock Ironwood)
- Curtisia dentata (Assegai tree)
- Diospyros whyteana (Bladdernut Tree)
- Dodonaea viscosa (Hopbush)
- Elaeodendron schinoides (Spoonwood)
- Grewia occidentalis (Cross-berry tree)
- Gymnosporia heterophylla (Common Spike-thorn)
- Halleria lucida (Notsung)
- Ilex mitis (Cape Holly)
- Kiggelaria africana (Wild Peach)
- Maytenus acuminata (Silky bark tree)
- Maytenus oleoides (Mountain Maytenus)
- Cassine peragua (Forest Spoonwood)
- Canthium inerme (Turkeyberry tree)
- Cunonia capensis (Butterspoon tree)
- Ocotea bullata (Black Stinkwood)
- Olea capensis subsp. macrocarpa (Ironwood tree)
- Olinia ventosa (Hard Pear)
- Cyathea capensis (Forest Tree Fern)
- Cyathea dregei (Common Tree Fern)
- Pterocelastrus tricuspidatus (Candlewood)
- Rapanea melanophloeos (Cape Beech)
- Tarchonanthus camphoratus (Camphor Tree)
- Virgilia (Blossom Tree)
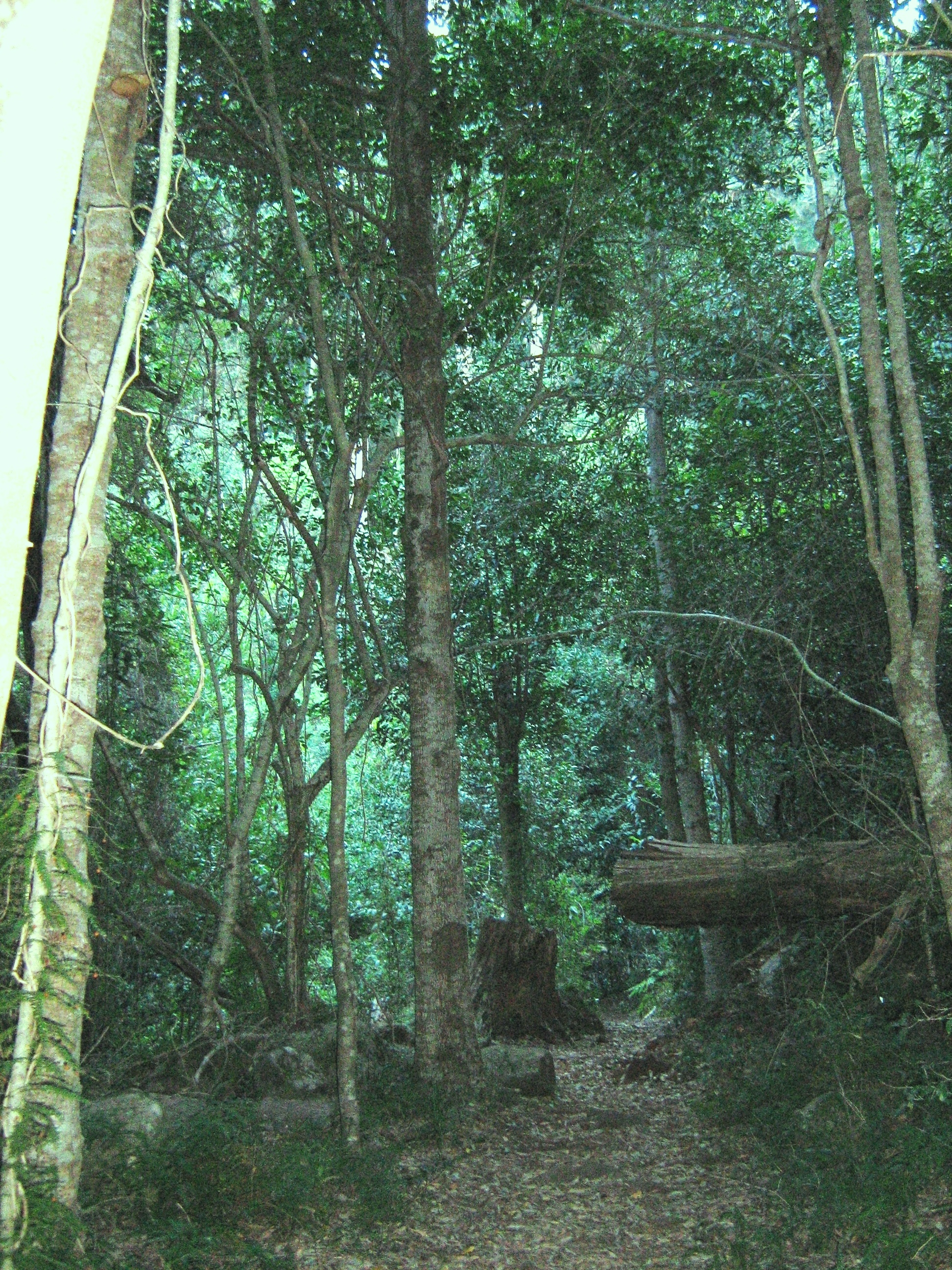

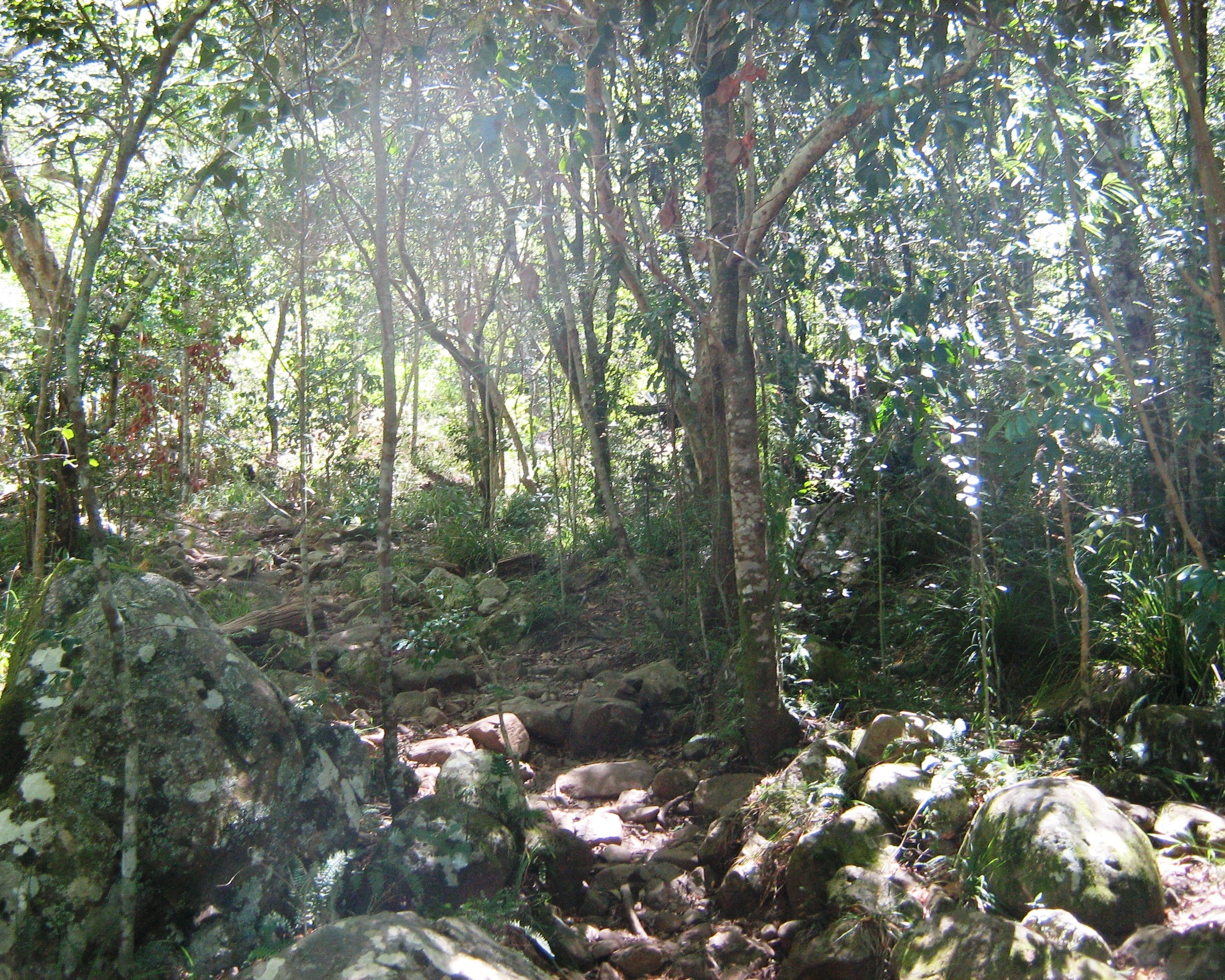

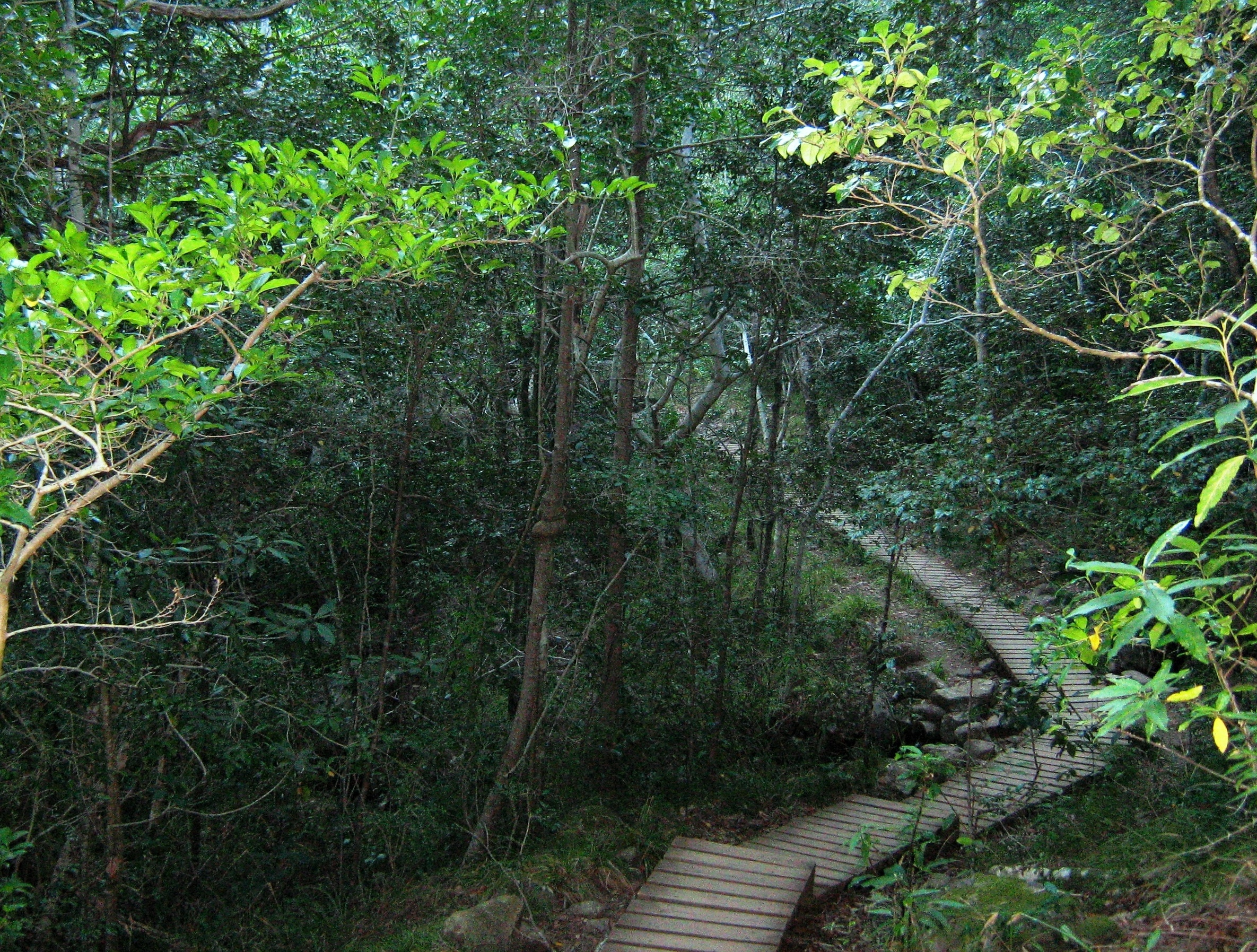

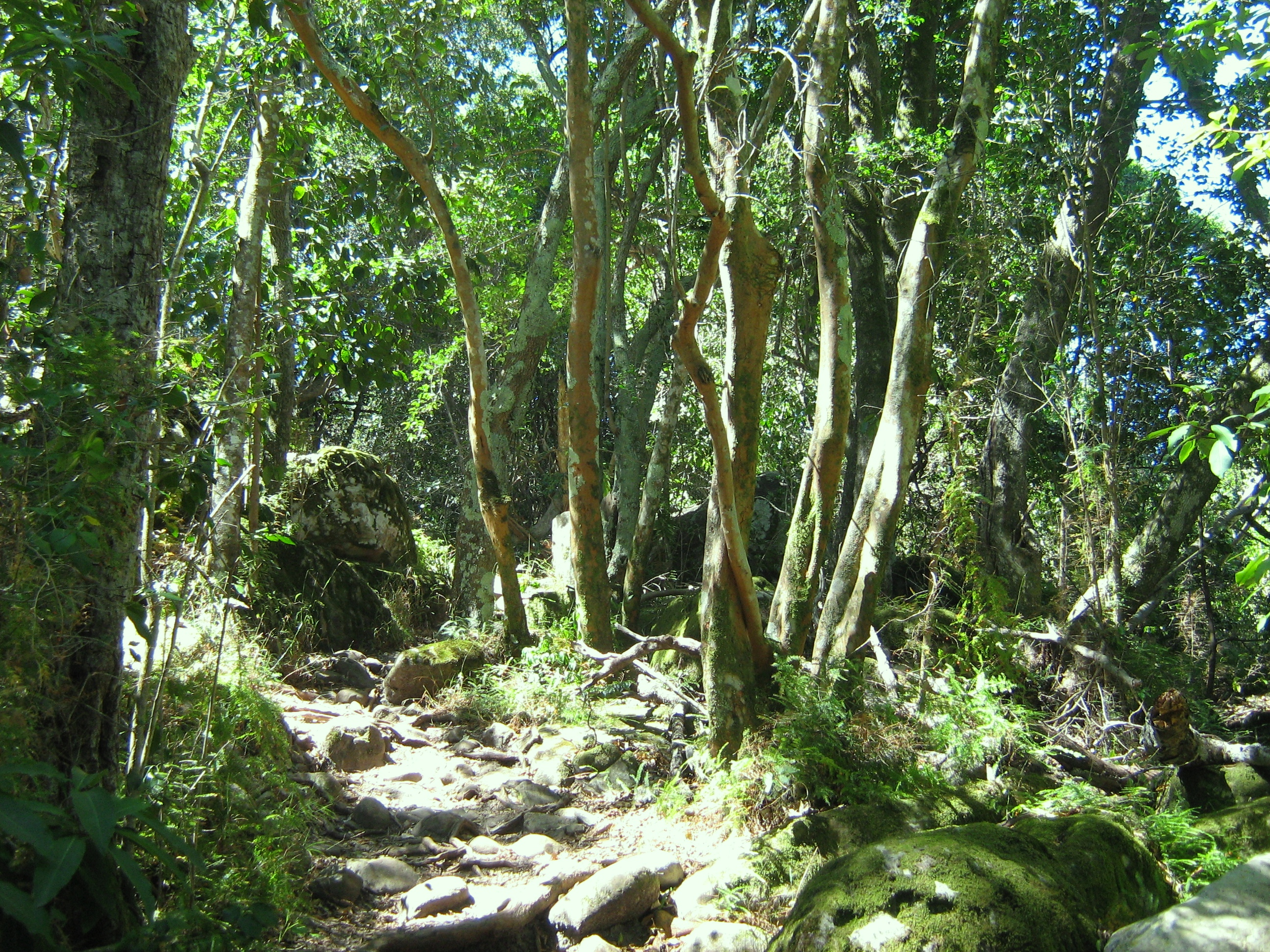

=== Pine and Gum plantations ===
In Newlands Forest, there are also 2 types of commercial plantation, Pines (Pinus radiata, Pinus pinaster) from Europe and America, and Gums (Eucalyptus lehmannii) from Australia.
Over many decades, large swaths of the Cape Peninsula were cleared of their indigenous vegetation types to make way for commercial logging, and these two species were imported and cultivated en masse to supply the Cape timber industry. These species were chosen for their fast growth, the quality of their wood and their straight uniform growth which made them easy to harvest. However, they rapidly spread and became invasive. When the logging was eventually stopped, the final crop of trees was allowed to remain un-harvested, and today forms an important recreational area for the inhabitants of the surrounding suburbs.

Both the pines and the eucalyptus("gum") trees are Category 2 invasive weeds. They rapidly seed into the surrounding indigenous forests and fynbos, then gradually outgrow and kill these ecosystems. Consequently, on-going maintenance is necessary, to keep these invasive trees contained within the plantations.

In addition, the leaf-litter of pines and gums changes the pH of the surrounding soil, poisoning other plant life. The trees may have evolved this feature to kill competing plants, and it is so effective that pine or gum forests in southern Africa eventually turn into monocultures or "green deserts". Consequently, there is also a policy in place to regularly "thin" the remaining plantations, in order that some other species can survive in between the pines.

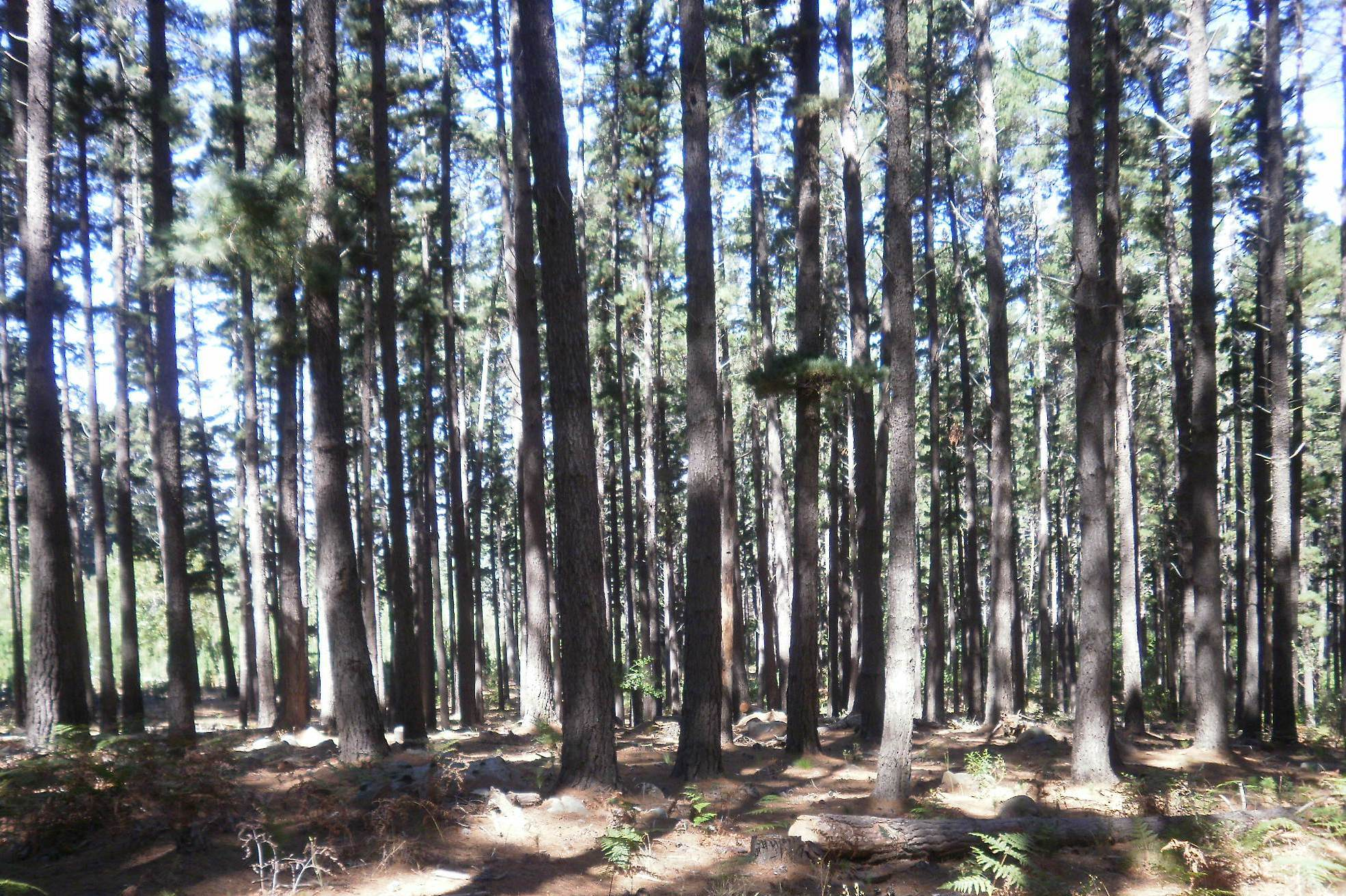

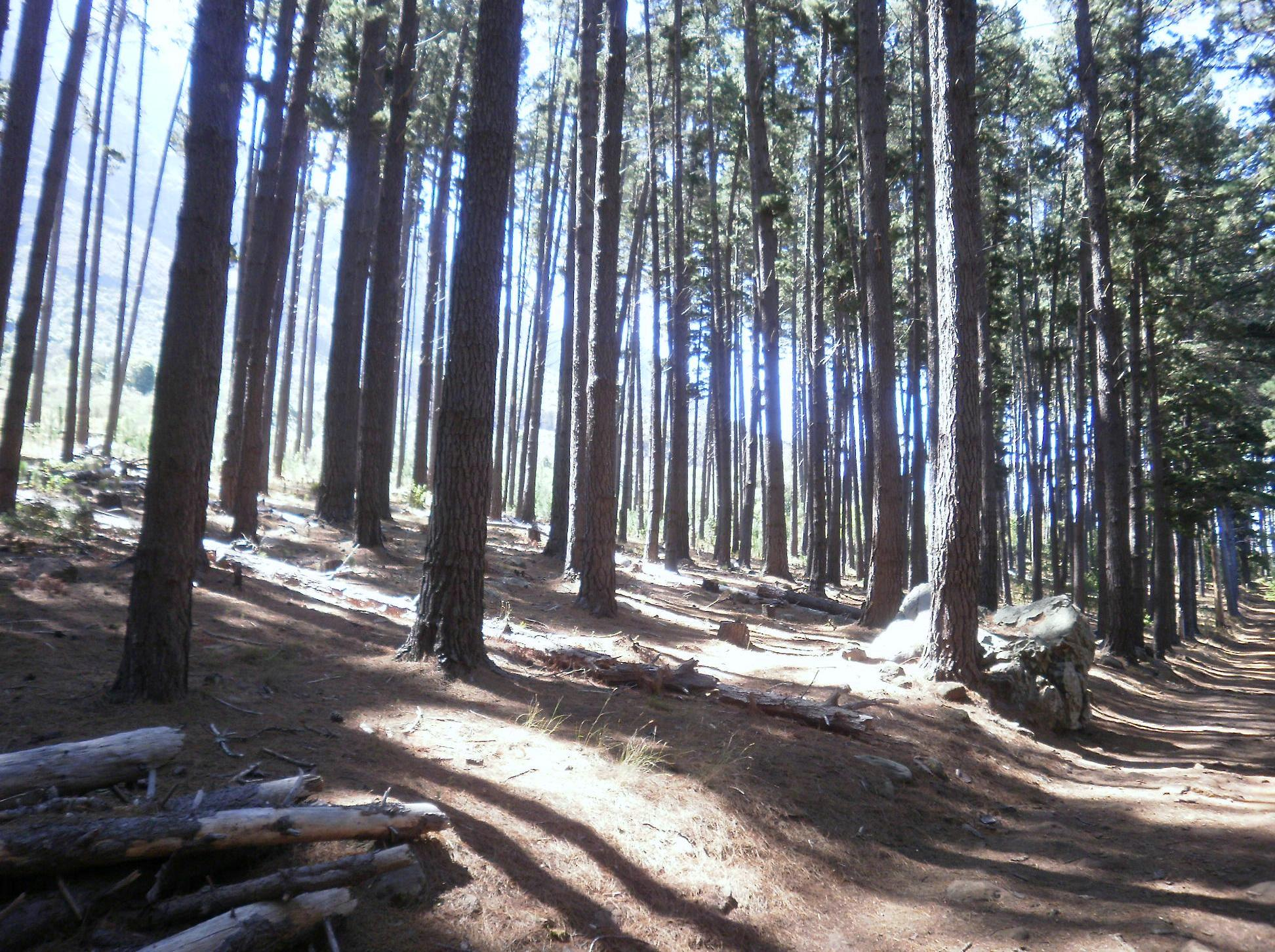

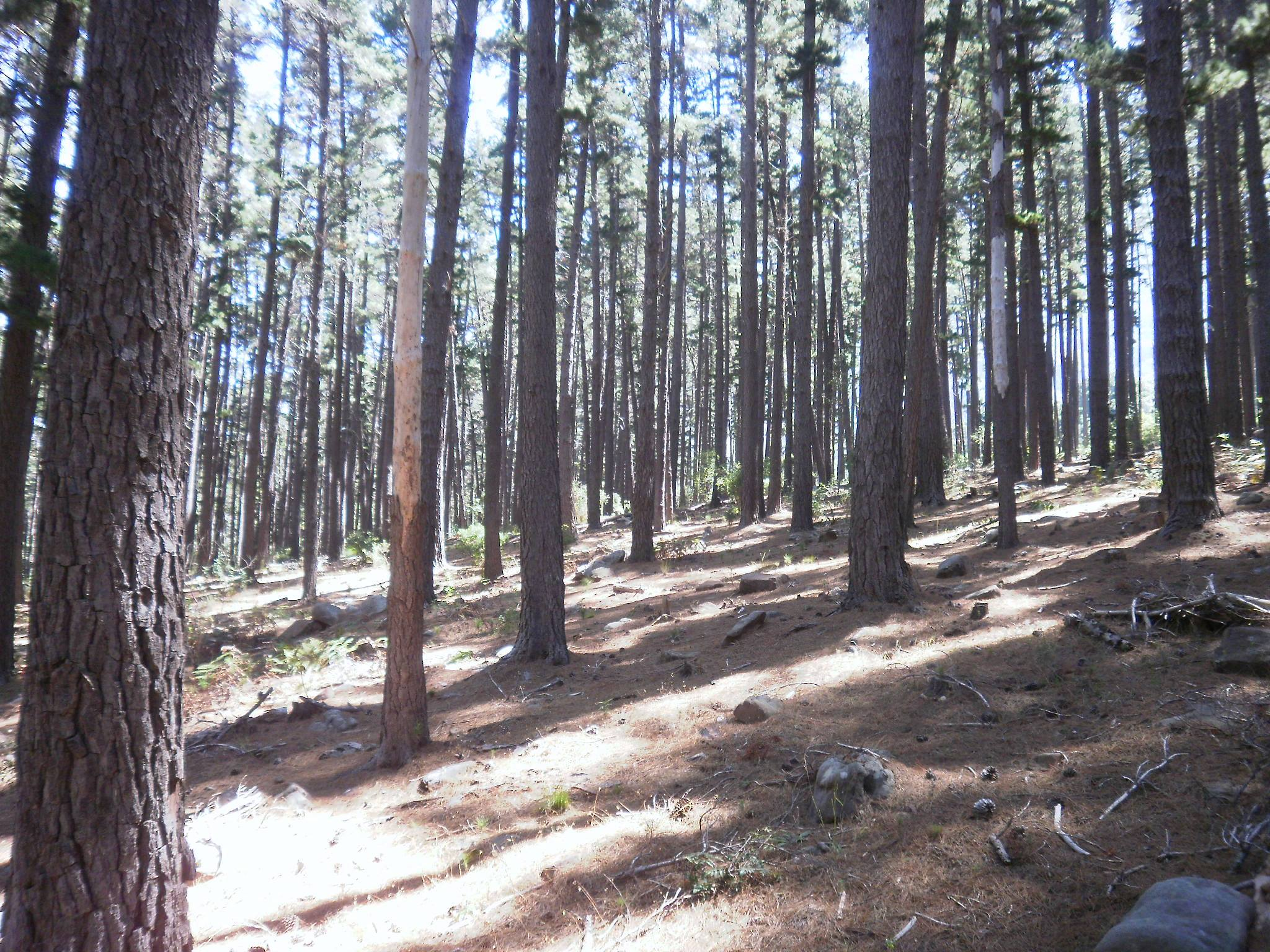

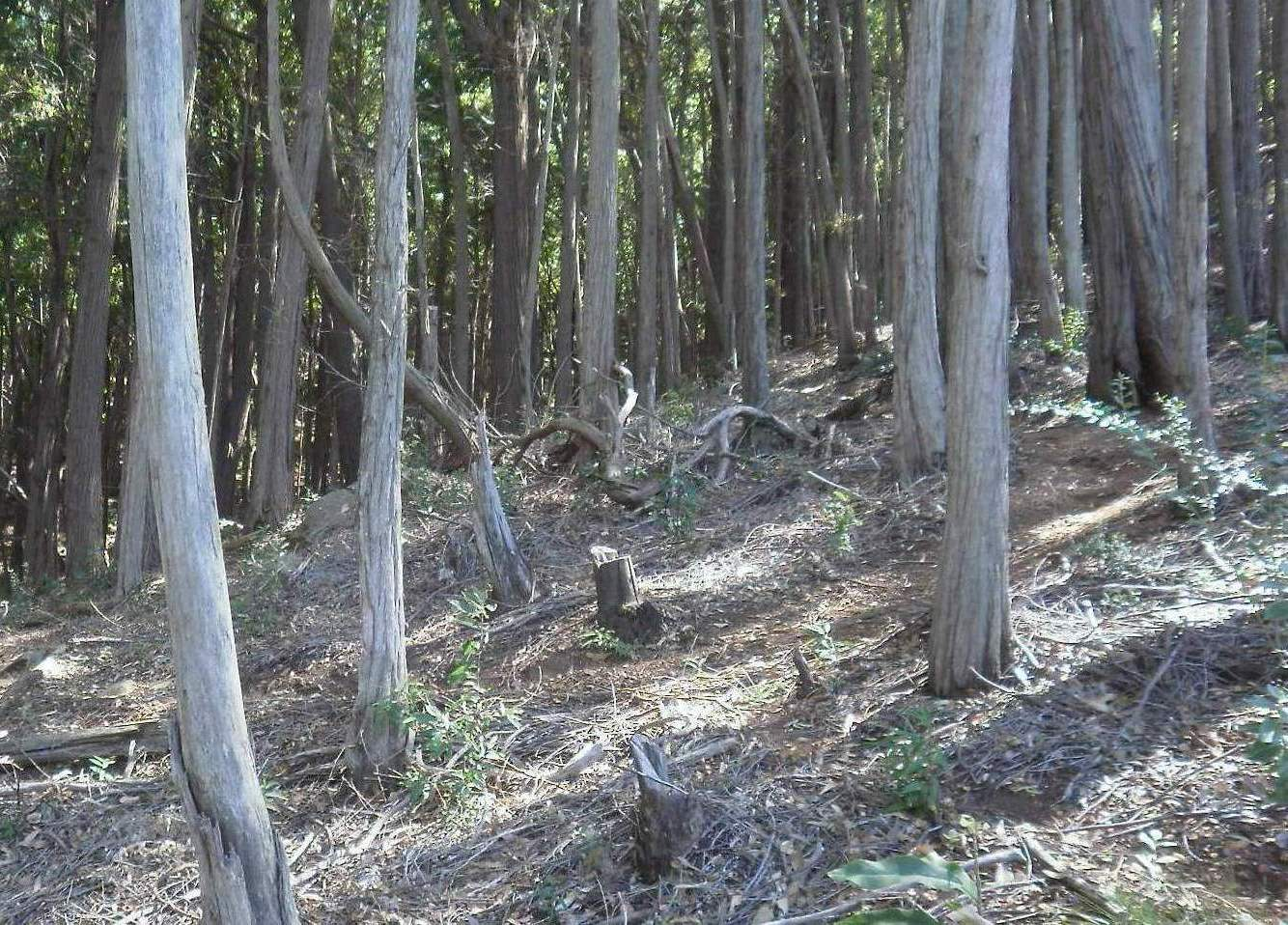

== History ==
The original inhabitants of the area were the Khoi-khoi, who migrated and herded their cattle over much of what is now the city of Cape Town. Jan van Riebeeck (the first Dutch governor of the Cape Colony) came across the extensive indigenous forests on the eastern slopes of Table Mountain and called them collectively "Boschenheuwel". Due to the need for timber, the local afro-temperate forests were, by the late seventeenth century, being severely over-exploited, and the colonial government issued a series of (largely ineffectual) laws to protect the forests. By the close of the eighteenth century most were gone, excepting a few pockets on the steep upper slopes of the mountain.

As indigenous wood supplies declined, the authorities decided to clear the eastern slopes of Table Mountain for commercial plantations. Fast-growing tree species such as Eucalyptus and Pinus radiata were chosen, and imported for cultivation. These trees also had the advantage of being tall, uniform and straight – all the more suitable for efficient logging. The two World Wars each caused a boom in the timber industry and the size of the forests grew. After the subsequent decline in Cape Town's logging industry, some of the plantations were removed to allow for the return of the original natural vegetation. In other places such as Newlands Forest, the final crop was allowed to remain, unharvested, and the area recently took on a new function as a recreational area.

== Buildings and infrastructure ==
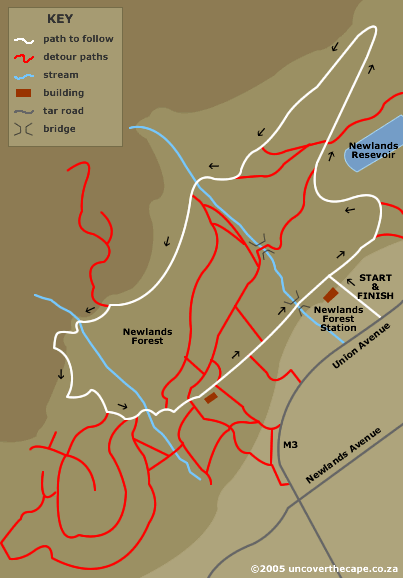
Newlands Forest Map

The Fire Station operates emergency bushfire fighting from the Newlands base, running water dumps with three helicopters. The Fire Station also serves as the Headquarters of the growing Volunteer Wildfire Services (VWS) fire fighting group.

The City Parks Nursery (see Map Image) is maintained and ran to supply the public areas of Cape Town with a wide range of flora. Including four large green houses and a large expanse of growing land, the City Parks team grow a wide range of plants to be used in the centre islands of Cape Town's highways and public service areas.
It has also recently begun a project to grow and reintroduce indigenous species of tree to Newlands Forest, with the long-term aim of rehabilitating the original afro-temperate forests.

The Newlands Reservoir (see Map Image) was built in the 60's by the then Afrikaans Government. A tribute to South African engineering and construction of the time, it serves as the main potable water source of the Southern Suburbs of Cape Town. Water is stored, treated and distributed from this site.

Also included in the conservancy land are a number of Council Houses owned by the City Parks Board. Of the eight houses, one is particularly well known for its classical design and scenic location. The original building, constructed in 1965, underwent minor alterations between 2000 and 2003. However a large part of the original building was maintained. The home, affectionately known by residents as "The Reservoir", has been home to a few well known Cape Town residents since it was built. Perhaps the best known resident being Father Kevin Robarts, a popular figure well known in the Newlands Parish. Since Father Robarts' passing in late 2007, the house has been maintained by his remaining family. In 2010, Father Pearce took over from the Father Robarts officially. Father Pearce has long been known in the region for accompanying his sermons with his guitar playing. On 1 January 2010, to mark the occasion of being appointed as the parish leader officially, Father Pearce is said to have walked the entire length and breadth of the forest, blessing it as he went.
