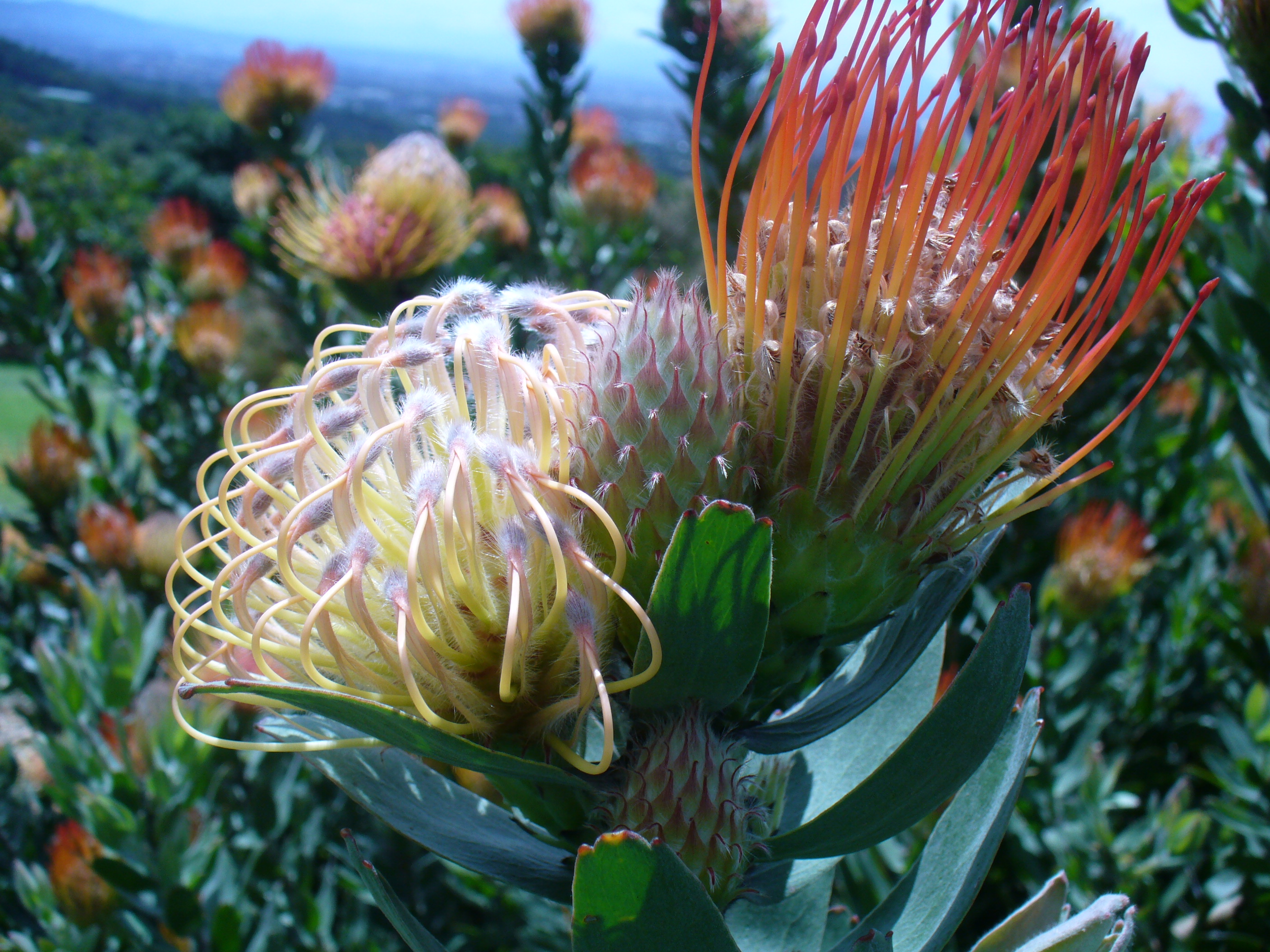

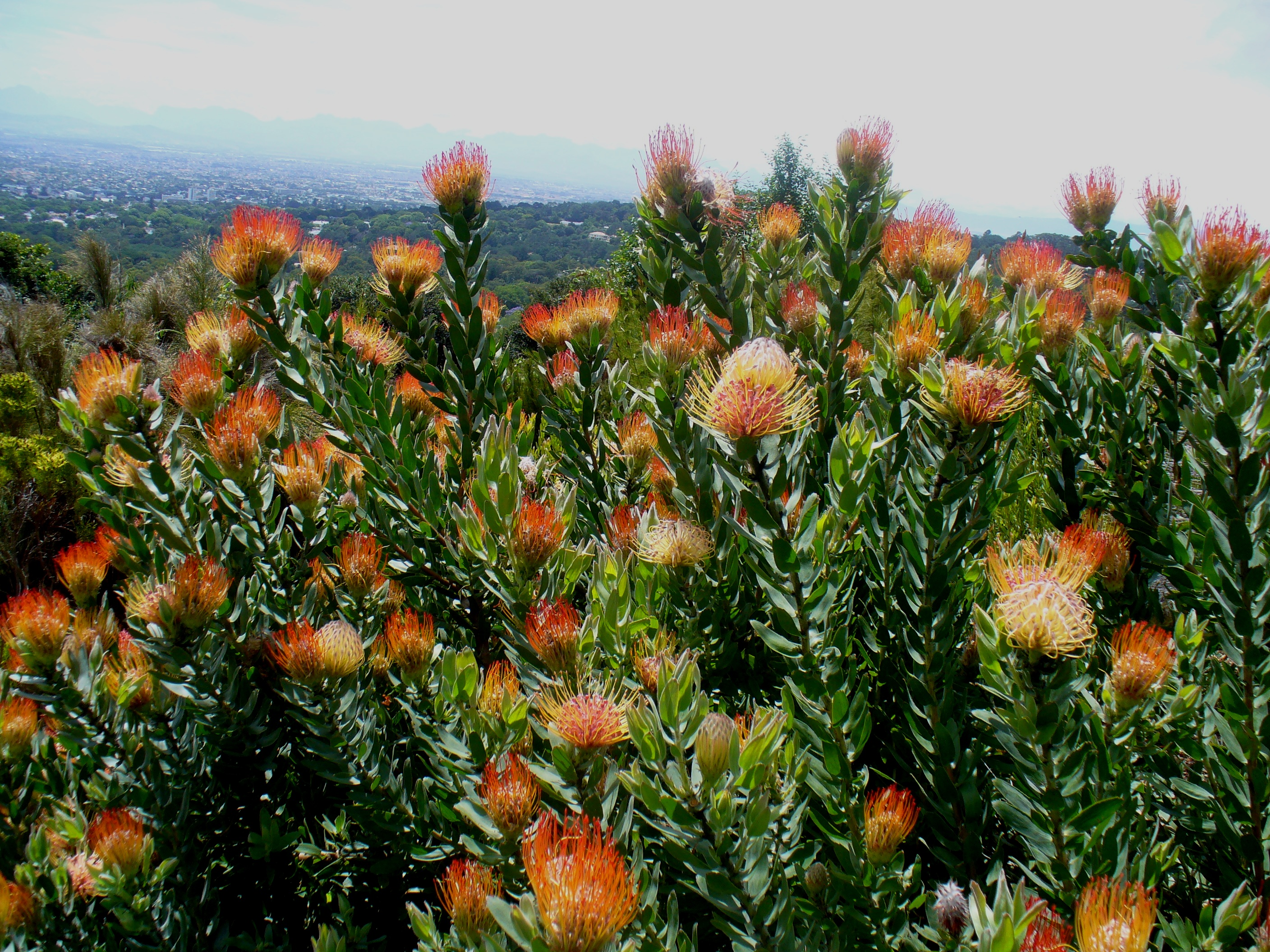

Conservation status
- Endangered (IUCN 3.1)

Scientific classification
- Kingdom: Plantae
- Clade: Embryophytes
- Clade: Tracheophytes
- Clade: Angiosperms
- Clade: Eudicots
- Order: Proteales
- Family: Proteaceae
- Genus: Leucospermum
- Species: L. gueinzii

Binomial name
- Leucospermum gueinzii Meiss. in DC.

Synonyms
- Leucadendron gueinzii

= Leucospermum gueinzii =

Species of plant from the Western Cape of South Africa

Leucospermum gueinzii is an evergreen, upright shrub of 2–3 m (6–9 ft) high from the family Proteaceae. It has pointy lance-shaped to elliptic, eventually hairless, mostly entire leaves and egg-shaped, later flatter flower heads of about 12 cm in diameter, containing initially deep orange, later crimson flowers. From the center of each flower emerges a long style with a thickened tip, giving the entire head the appearance of a pincushion. Its flowers can be found between August and December. It is called kloof fountain-pincushion or shorter kloof pincushion in English. This is an endemic species restricted to a very small area near the south coast of the Western Cape province in South Africa.

== Description ==
The kloof pincushion is a stout upright evergreen shrub of 2–3 m (6–9 ft) high, with a single main stem and branches that curve upward or are upright from the base. The flowering stems are 6–9 mm (0.24–0.36 in) thick and covered with fine short cringy hairs and long erect hairs in between. The leaves hairless or seldom initially with some powdery hairs, pointy lance-shaped to elliptic, bright green in colour, 7 1/2–10 cm (3–4 in) long, with an entire margin ending in one bony reddish tip or seldom with two to four reddish teeth near the tip, without a stalk, at an upward angle and overlapping.

The flower heads are egg-shaped when opening, flatter when mature, 10–14 cm (4–5 1/2 in) in diameter, mostly set individually, sometimes clustered with two or three together, each on a stalk of up to 1 cm (0.4 in) long. The common base of the flowers in the same head is narrow cone-shaped with a pointy tip, 4–4 1/2 cm (2.6–2.8 in) high and 1–1 1/4 cm (0.4–0.5 in) across the base. The bracts subtending the flowerhead are broad oval with a pointy tip, the highest whorl with a pointed tip, 15–24 mm (0.60–0.96 in) long and 5–8 mm (0.20–0.36 in) wide, cartilaginous at its base, brown and papery near the tip, the margin with a dense regular row of hairs and the tip mostly with a tuft of long stiff heairs. The bracts subtending the individual flower are pointy lance-shaped 2 1/2–3 cm (1.0–1.2 in) long and 5–9 mm (0.20–0.36 in) wide, cartilaginous in consistency, thickly covered in woolly hairs at the base, the margins with a regular row of hairs and the tip with some fine stiff hairs.

The 4-merous perianth of 5 1/2–6 cm (2.2–2.4 in) long is greenish yellow at its base and amber–coloured near its tip. The lower part, that remains merged when the flower is open, is about 7 mm (0.28 in) long, hairless, narrow at its base and somewhat bulging toward the center of the head higher up. The middle part (or claws), carries a fine hairs and some straight longer hairs, and is curled back when the flower has opened. The upper part (or limbs), which enclosed the pollen presenter in the bud, consists of four pointy and very narrowly lance-shaped lobes, three of which clinging together, each about 1 cm (0.4 in) long and 2 mm (0.08), the outside roughly hairy with some long hairs, with a tuft of stiff hairs at the tip. From the centre of the perianth emerges a tapering, deep orange style of 7–7 1/2 cm (2.8–3 in) long, and is strongly curved towards the outside of the head near the pollen presenter. The thickened part at the tip of the style called pollen presenter is cylinder-shaped with a pointy tip, 8–10 mm (0.32-0.40 in) long, with the groove that functions as the stigma across the very tip. The ovary is subtended by four ivory-coloured, awl-shaped scales of about 3 mm (0.12 in) long.

=== Differences with related species ===
L. gueinzii differs from its look-a-like Leucospermum grandiflorum because it has eventually hairless, pointy lance-shaped to elliptic leaves of 7 1/2–10 cm (3–4 in) long, with an entire margin or seldom with two or three teeth near the tip, with the perianth 5 1/2–6 cm (2.2–2.4 in) long and the flower is deep orange when opening (later turning crimson). L grandiflorum on the other hand has broadly elliptic to elliptic oblong leaves, of 5–8 cm (2–3 1/4 in) long, mostly with three teeth near the tip, with fine grey cringy hairs and the perianth 4 1/2–5 cm (1.8–2.0 in) long, and bright yellow bright yellow when opening (later turning orange).

== Taxonomy ==
The kloof pincushion was first collected for science by Wilhelm Gueinzius, who worked in the Stellenbosch region in 1839 and 1840. In 1856, Carl Meissner described it in a book by Augustin Pyramus de Candolle, and named it Leucospermum gueinzii after its collector. Otto Kuntze later assigned it to the genus Leucadendron.

L. gueinzii has been assigned to the fireworks pincushions, section Cardinistyle.

== Distribution, habitat and ecology ==
The kloof pincushion is an endemic species that is restricted to a small area in the Hottentots Holland Mountains, in particular on the Helderberg, Jonkershoek, Bushmans Castle, and near Sir Lowry's Pass. Karl Ludwig Philipp Zeyher collected this species at Houw Hoek but it has now disappeared from there. The average annual precipitation in the distribution range of L. gueinzii is 750–1150 mm (30–45 in), mostly during the winter. So it grows in much wetter locations than its look-alike L. grandiflorum. It mostly grows in dense sclerophyll vegetations on sheltered locations near streaming water such as in gorges, at altitudes between 300 and 900 m (1000–3000 ft). It only grows on heavy clay that has resulted from the weathering of Cape Granite.

== Conservation ==
Leucospemum gueinzii is considered an endangered species according to the Red List of South African plants. It is threatened by habitat loss caused by afforestation, the expansion of vineyards and competition by invasive plant species.
