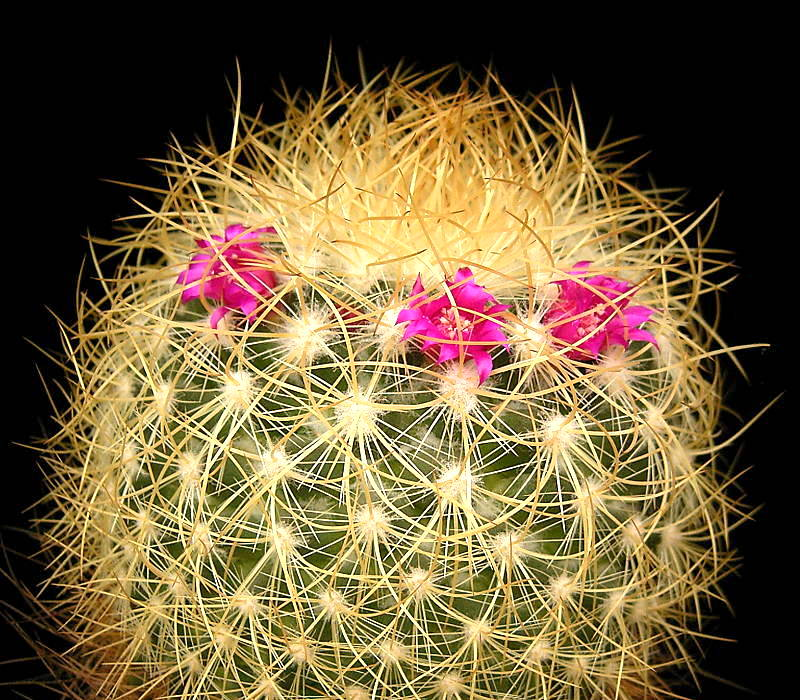

Scientific classification
- Kingdom: Plantae
- Clade: Tracheophytes
- Clade: Angiosperms
- Clade: Eudicots
- Order: Caryophyllales
- Family: Cactaceae
- Subfamily: Cactoideae
- Genus: Mammillaria
- Species: M. rhodantha

Binomial name
- Mammillaria rhodantha Link & Otto

= Mammillaria rhodantha =

Species of cactus

Mammillaria rhodantha, the rainbow pincushion, is a plant in the cactus family (Cactaceae) and is one of 171 species in the genus Mammillaria which are characterized by having nipple-shaped tubercles or prominences on their surface.

== Description ==
The rainbow pincushion is a small cactus usually ranging from 6 to 12 in (15–30 cm) in height. It usually grows in small clumps but can be solitary.

The cactus's stem is a short glabrous column that is covered with spikes. The entire plant body is covered with conical tubercles, from which spines arise. Usually there are 15 to 18 spines 3 to 7 mm (0.12–0.28 in) in length growing from each tubercle. It has spikes that grow from the entire body; those on the bottom half of the cactus have white or gray and may appear to be dying. Also, a white wool that can be seen growing on the top part of the plant's body.

The species flowers for very long periods of time, normally initially blooming in the spring and continuing to bloom until autumn. Its flowers are deep pink to purple in color. The cactus also produces orange-brown seeds.

M. rhodantha can endure temperatures down to −4 °C (25 °F); it has frost tolerance.

=== Synonyms ===
- Mammillaria droegeana
- Mammillaria fuscata
- Mammillaria rhodantha var. droegeana
- Mammillaria calacantha
- Mammillaria pringlei
- Mammillaria bonavitii
- Cactus rhodanthus
- Neomammillaria rhodantha

== Gardening ==
It is commonly used as a houseplant. It does not need much care throughout the year. It is small in size and usually only requires a small pot. Since it is a desert plant it does not have to be watered often. It does not require any special treatment other than plentiful light to encourage spine formation. It also has flowers for much of the year, making it very visually appealing.

Under the synonym Mammillaria pringlei (lemon ball), M. rhodantha subsp. pringlei is a recipient of the Royal Horticultural Society's Award of Garden Merit.
