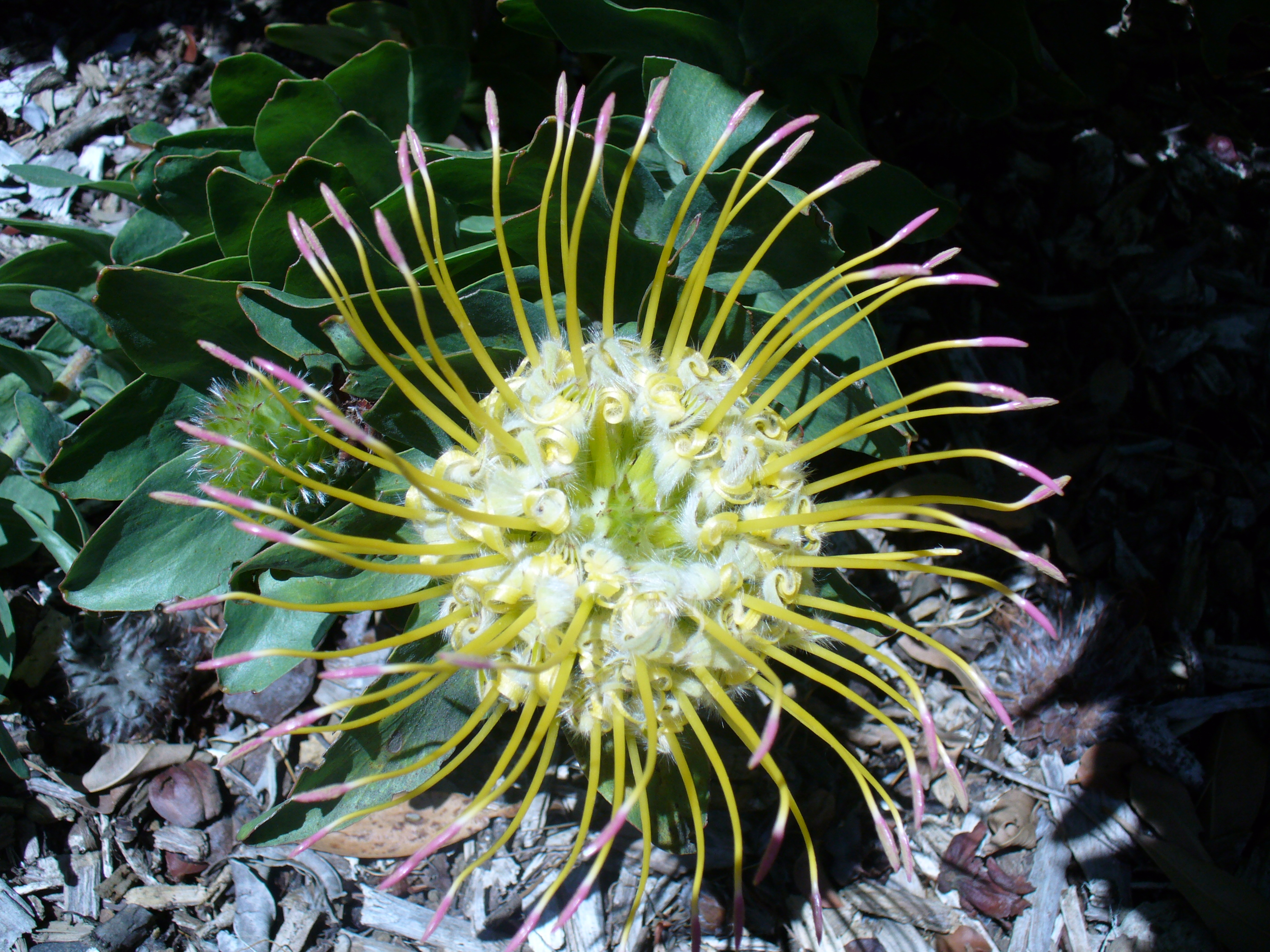

Conservation status
- Vulnerable (IUCN 3.1)

Scientific classification
- Kingdom: Plantae
- Clade: Tracheophytes
- Clade: Angiosperms
- Clade: Eudicots
- Order: Proteales
- Family: Proteaceae
- Genus: Leucospermum
- Species: L. grandiflorum

Binomial name
- Leucospermum grandiflorum (Salisb.) R.Br.

Synonyms
- Leucadendrum grandiflorum; Protea villosiuscula, P. villosa; P. erosa

= Leucospermum grandiflorum =

South African pincushion shrub

Leucospermum grandiflorum is an evergreen, upright shrub of up to 2½ m (7½ ft) high that is assigned to the family Proteaceae. It has elliptic, greyish green, softly hairy leaves and initially egg-shaped heads with yellow flowers, later flat with flowers turning orange. From the center of each flower emerges a long pale yellow style with a pink thickened tip (both later turning carmine) that is bent slightly clockwise, giving the entire head the appearance of a pincushion. Its flowers can be found between July and December. It is called grey-leaf fountain-pincushion or rainbow pincushion in English. L. grandiflorum is an endemic species that can only be found in nature in the Western Cape province of South Africa.

== Description ==
Leucospermum grandiflorum is an evergreen, upright shrub of up to 2½ m (7½ ft) high that has a single robust main stem. Its flowering stems curve up or emerge upright from their base and carry some short cringy hairs and some straight, silky hairs of about ½ cm (0.2 in) long. The softly hairy leaves broadly elliptic to elliptic-oblong, 5–8 cm (2.0–3.2 in) long and 2–3 cm (0.8–1.2 in) wide, mostly with three bony-tipped teeth near the tip, seldom without teeth.

The hairy-looking young flower buds have a spinning top shape. The flowers open in a spiral. The flower heads are initially egg-shaped, later more flattened, 10–12 cm (4.0–4.8 in) across, almost seated or with a stalk of at most 1½ cm (0.6 in) long. The common base of the flowers in the same head are narrowly cone-shaped with a pointy tip, about 4 cm (1.6 in) long and 1 cm (0.4 in) across its base. The bracts subtending the flower head are pointy oval in shape, 1–1½ cm (0.4–0.6 in) long and 5–8 mm (0.20–0.32 in) wide, cartilaginous near its base and papery towards the tip, with a regular row of short equal length hairs along its edges and a tuft of longer, stiff and straight hairs at the tip. The bracts subtending the individual flowers are about 2 cm (0.8 in) long and ½ cm (0.2 in) wide, pointy lance-shaped with a slightly recurved tip, very thickly woolly at the base and covered with fine silky hair further up. The 4-merous perianth is 4½–5 cm long and pale greenish yellow in colour. The lower part, where the lobes remain merged when the flower has opened (called tube), is about 7 mm (0.28 in) long, hairless, narrow at its base and somewhat bulging near its higher end, but slightly compressed sideways and about 4 mm (0.16 in) long. The lobes in the middle part (or claws), where the perianth is split lengthwise, curve back on their base when the flower opens, are 9–12 mm (0.36–0.48 in) long, and carry a few slender, spreading hairs. The upper part, which enclosed the pollen presenter in the bud consists of four narrowly lance-shaped limbs are about 8 mm (0.32 in) long, narrowly lance-shaped to linear with a pointy tip and carry fine silky hairs. From the perianth emerges a style of 7–7½ cm (2.8–3.0 in) long, initially yellow but later turning to crimson, and that is slightly obliquely deflected clockwise. The so-called pollen presenter, onto which the pollen is transferred from the anthers in the bud, are cylinder-shaped with a pointy tip, 6–8 mm (0.24–0.32 in) long, initially pink, later carmine-coloured, with a groove that performs the function of the stigma across the very tip. The ovary is subtended by four opaque awl-shaped scales of about 3 mm (0.12 in) long.

=== Differences with related species ===
L. grandiflorum has broadly elliptic to elliptic oblong leaves, of 5–8 cm (2–3¼ in) long, mostly with three teeth near the tip, with fine grey cringy hairs and the perianth 4½–5 cm (1.8–2.0 in) long, and bright yellow when opening (later turning orange). It differs from its look-a-like Leucospermum gueinzii, which has eventually hairless, pointy lance-shaped to elliptic leaves of 7½–10 cm (3–4 in) long, with an entire margin or seldom with two or three teeth near the tip, with the perianth 5½–6 cm (2.2–2.4 in) long and the flower is deep orange when opening (later turning crimson).

== Taxonomy ==
The grey-leaf fountain-pincushion was first collected near Paarl already in 1799, by Roxburgh and James Niven. According to Richard Anthony Salisbury and was raised and cultivated from seeds thad had been collected by the latter at Hibbert's conservatory and those plants successfully set seed themselves. Salisbury described the plant in the Paradisus Londinensis in 1808, and because the specimen that the description was based up on, the colour plate in this publication serve as lectotype. In 1810, Robert Brown published the name Protea villosiuscula that had been suggested by English naturalist, botanist and patron of the natural sciences Joseph Banks, but without providing a proper description. Protea erosa had been proposed for yet another specimen by Hinrich Lichtenstein, a name that was later published by Kurt Polycarp Joachim Sprengel in 1825, again without providing a proper description. John Patrick Rourke considered all of the names synonyms in 1970. Since Brown's genus name Leucospermum was given priority in 1900, the correct scientific name is Leucospermum grandiflorum, a new combination that was made by Robert Brown.

L. grandiflorum has been assigned to the fireworks pincushions, section Cardinistyle.

The species name grandiflorum is a contraction of the Latin words grandis meaning "large" and florum meaning "flower" or "blossom". Outside of South Africa, the common name "rainbow pincushion" is also used for the Cactaceae Mammillaria rhodantha.

== Distribution, habitat and ecology ==
The grey-leaf fountain pincushion can be found in a vegetation type called Boland Granite Fynbos, in the hills around Durbanville, on Paarl mountain, on the Paardeberg near Malmesbury, Malmesbury, and a few isolated spots in the Berg River valley, where it threatened to go extinct in the 1970s. The species mostly grows on clayey soils produced by the weathering of Cape Granite, but occasionally occurs on Tertiary sand sitting on top of Malmesbury gravel. It prospers in hot, dry and exposed habitats, often in facing north, with other low shrubs such as renosterbos and kapokbossie at 80–500 m (250–1600 ft) altitude. The average annual precipitation in these regions is 380–635 mm (15–25 in), mostly during the winter half year, specifically May to August. On occasion, the night temperature may drop below 0 °C.

The large flowers of the grey-leaf fountain pincushion are mostly pollinated by Cape sugarbirds. The mature fruits fall to the ground about two months after flowering. Here they are gathered by native ants, which carry them to there underground nest, where the elaiosome is eaten. The remaining seed is hard and slippery and cannot be carried away in the small ants' jaws, and so remain underground, safe from seed-eating mice and birds and overhead fires. When increased temperature fluctuations or charwood chemicals carried underground by seeping rainwater signal that the surface has been cleared of its cover by a wildfire, the seeds germinate during the early winter.

== Conservation ==
The grey-leaf fountain pincushion is considered an endangered species. The populations of this species are estimated to have reduced by more than half during the last sixty years. Only five known locations of this species remain in the wild. The populations are regarded as unstable as the quality of the habitat and the number of mature plants are decreasing. Among the causes for the decline are illegal wild flower harvesting, invasive plants, land development for agriculture, afforestation and, too high frequency of wild fires.
