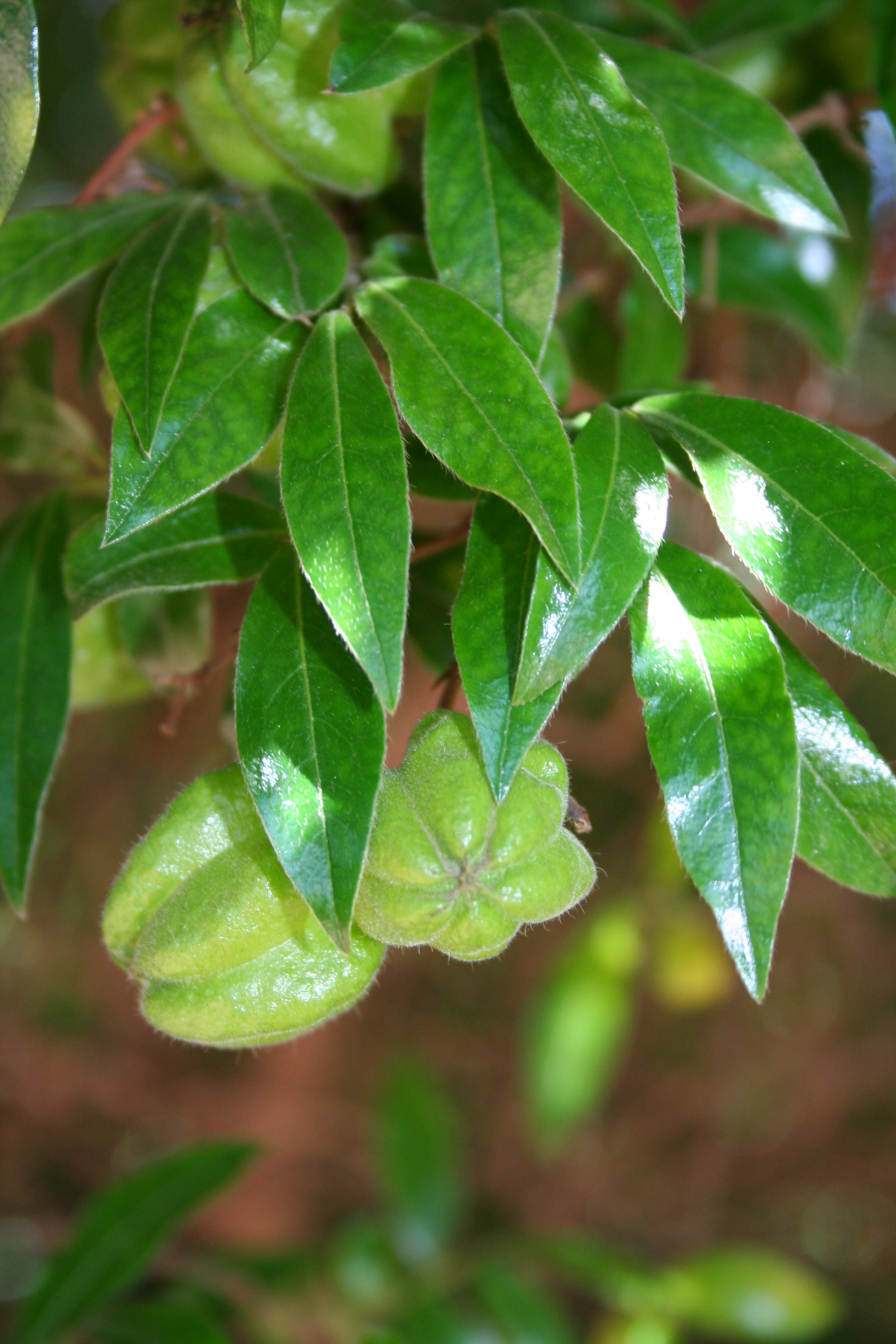
- The bladder-like capsules that enclose the tree's fruit.

Conservation status
- Least Concern (IUCN 3.1)

Scientific classification
- Kingdom: Plantae
- Clade: Tracheophytes
- Clade: Angiosperms
- Clade: Eudicots
- Clade: Asterids
- Order: Ericales
- Family: Ebenaceae
- Genus: Diospyros
- Species: D. whyteana

Binomial name
- Diospyros whyteana (Hiern) F.White (1961)

Synonyms
- Royena goetzei Gürke (1901); Royena lucida L. (1753); Royena lucida var. whyteana De Winter & Brenan (1954); Royena nyassae Gürke (1901); Royena whyteana Hiern (1894); Royena wilmsii Gürke (1898)

= Diospyros whyteana =

Species of tree

Diospyros whyteana (also known as the bladdernut, swartbas, wild coffee or umTenatane) is a small African tree of the ebony family. Bearing dark green, strikingly glossy leaves and creamy fragrant flowers, it is increasingly cultivated in Southern African gardens as an attractive and strong ornamental tree. It can attain a height of up to 6 m.

== Distribution ==
The Bladdernut has a wide distribution, occurring from Cape Town in the south to Tanzania's Eastern Arc Mountains in the north, ranging through South Africa, Eswatini, Mozambique, Zimbabwe, Zambia, and Malawi, and Tanzania. It naturally grows in Afro-montane forest and on rocky mountain slopes.

It grows on the edges of montane evergreen forest, often with the trees Hagenia abyssinica, Newtonia spp., and Cephalosphaera usambarensis, in fringing forest along streams and rivers, and in scrub forest. It ranges from (1350-)1500 to 2300 meters elevation in the tropics, and nearly to sea level in South Africa's more temperate climates at the southern end of its range.

== Cultivation ==
This decorative little tree is excellent for gardens, with its tidy shape, dark glossy leaves and small red fruits, which start developing from about August to November. If planted alone it makes a good "accent plant" (especially in small gardens). However, it also makes a very good hedge, as it has lush, dense foliage and responds particularly well to clipping. Lastly, it can be grown as a container plant (It is even used as a bonsai specimen). Diospyros can be grown in the sun as well as in the shade, although it grows taller and thinner in the shade. Once established, it is also relatively drought-resistant. It has sweetly scented flowers, and attracts birds to the garden.

Diospyros is dioecious (separate male and female trees), but can easily be propagated from seed, which should first be scratched/scarified before planting. The seed typically germinates in several weeks, and the juvenile trees are relatively slow growing.

== Pictures ==
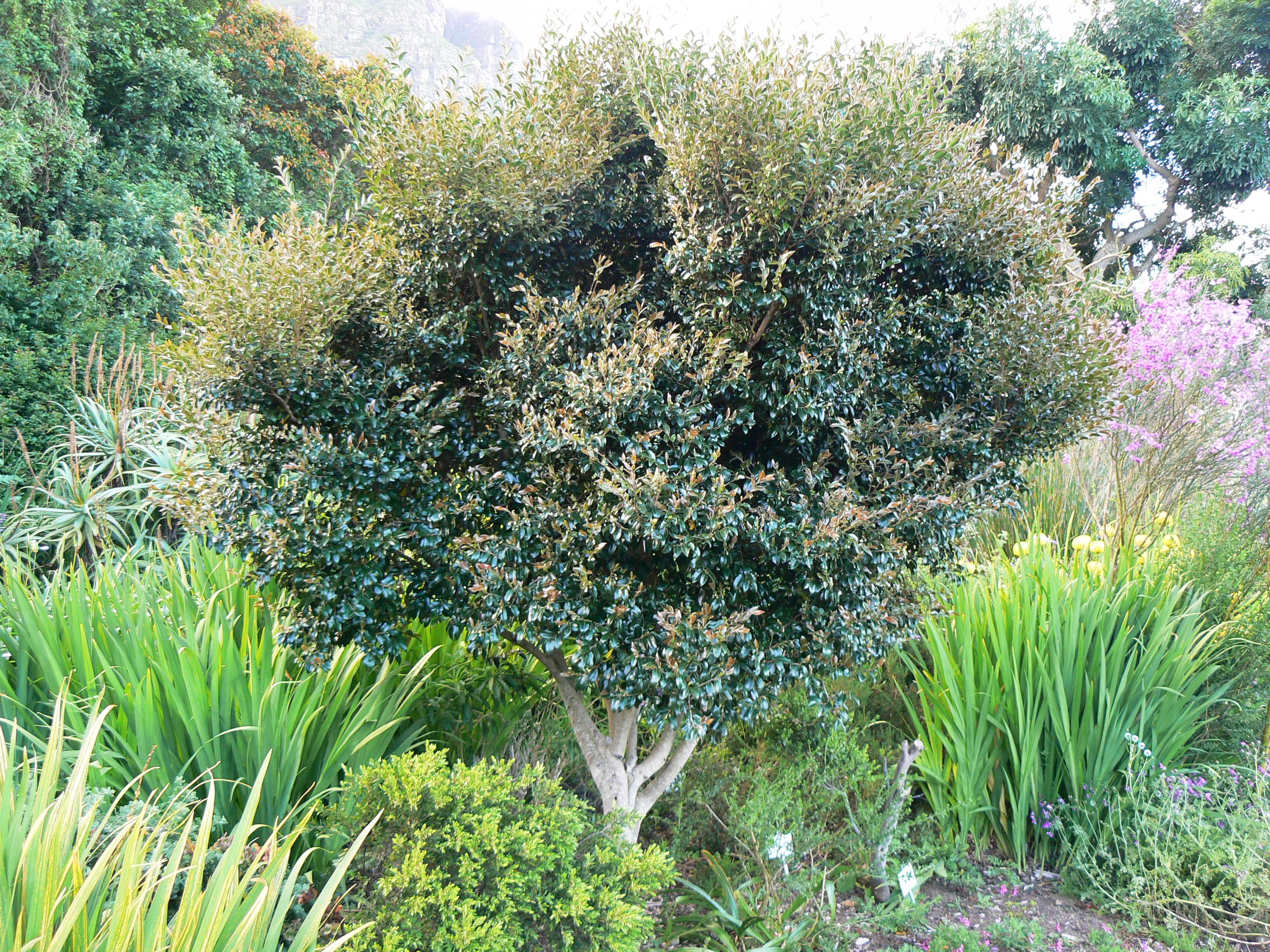
A small specimen, growing in Cape Town.

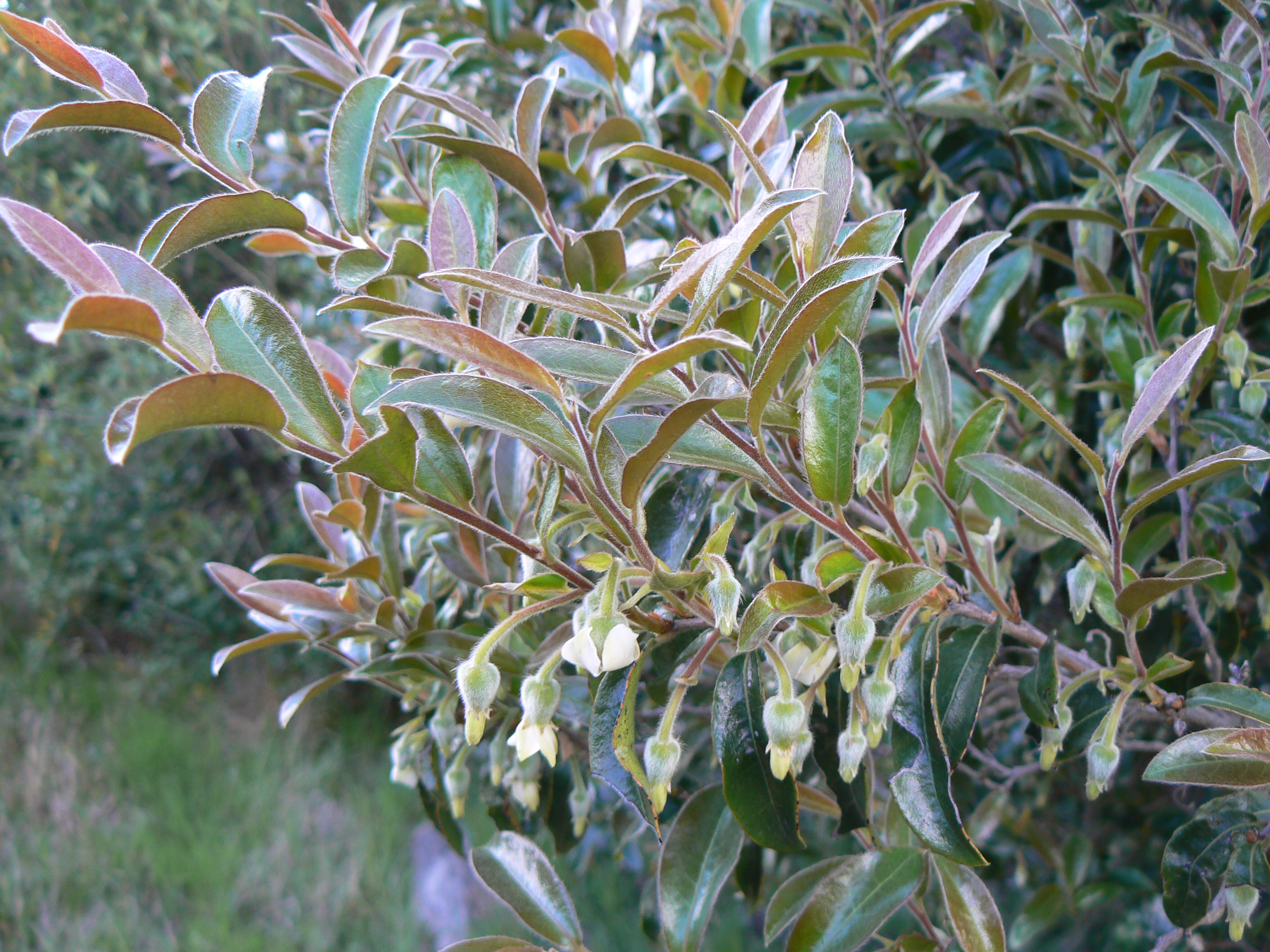
The small white flowers will fill a garden with pleasant fragrance.

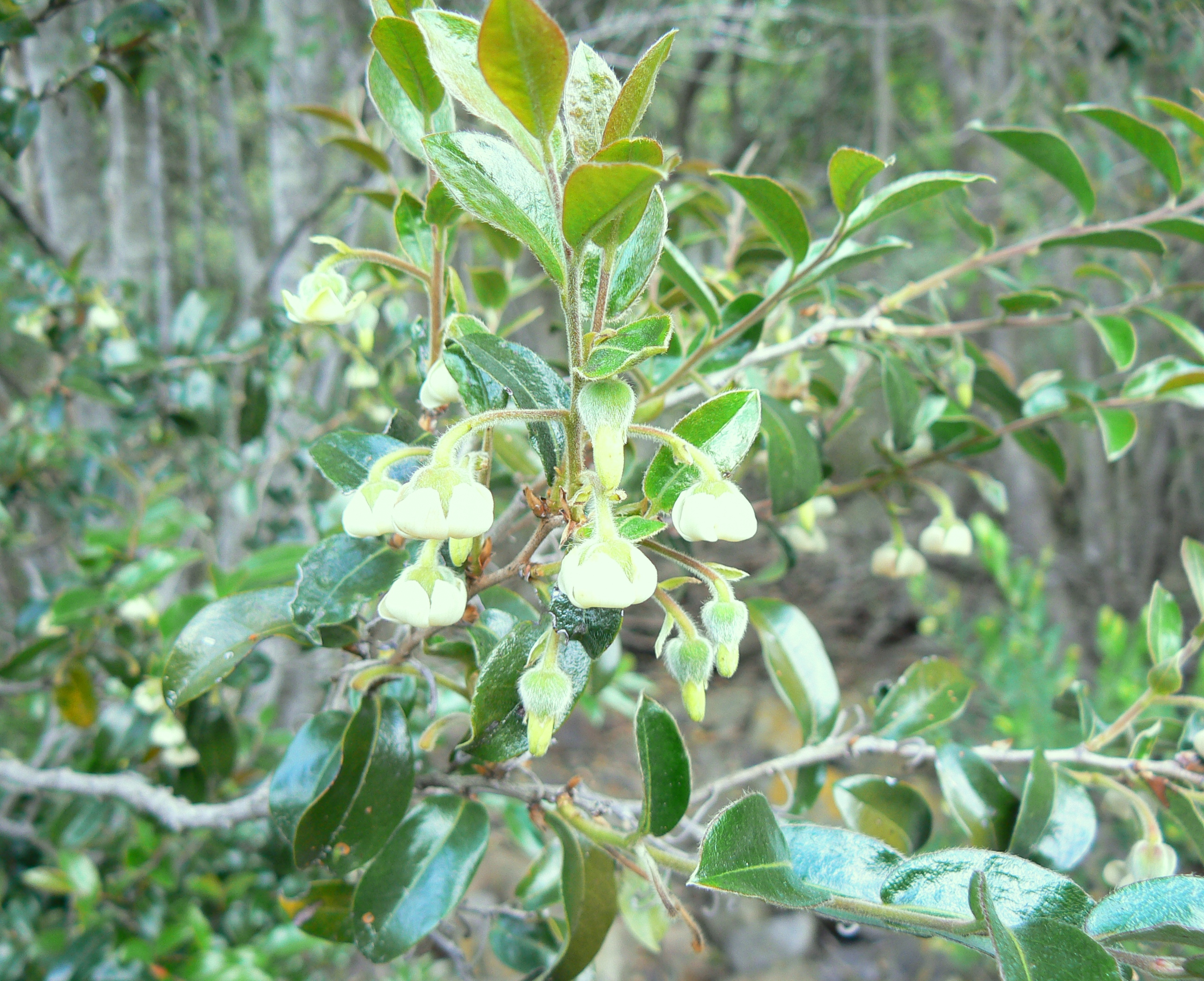

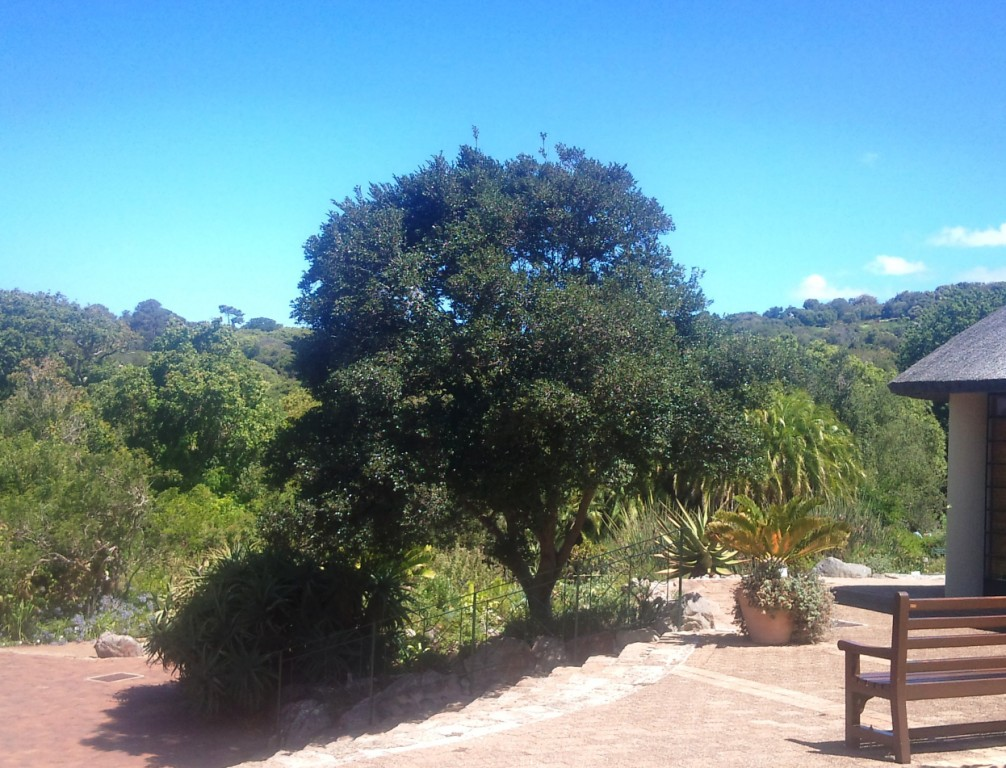
Medium-sized specimen in Kirstenbosch gardens on the slopes of Table Mountain.

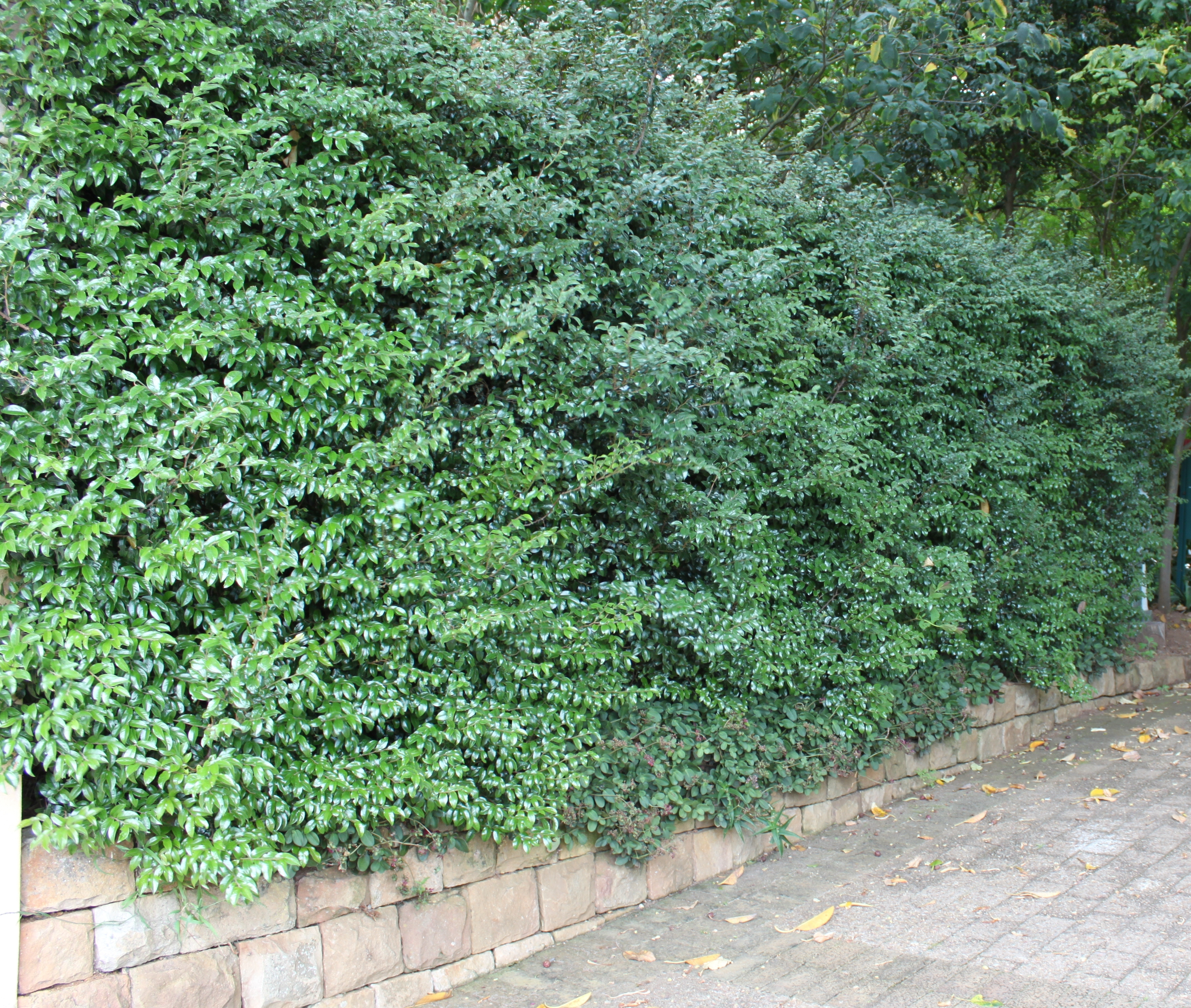
Diospyros whyteana used for hedging in South Africa.

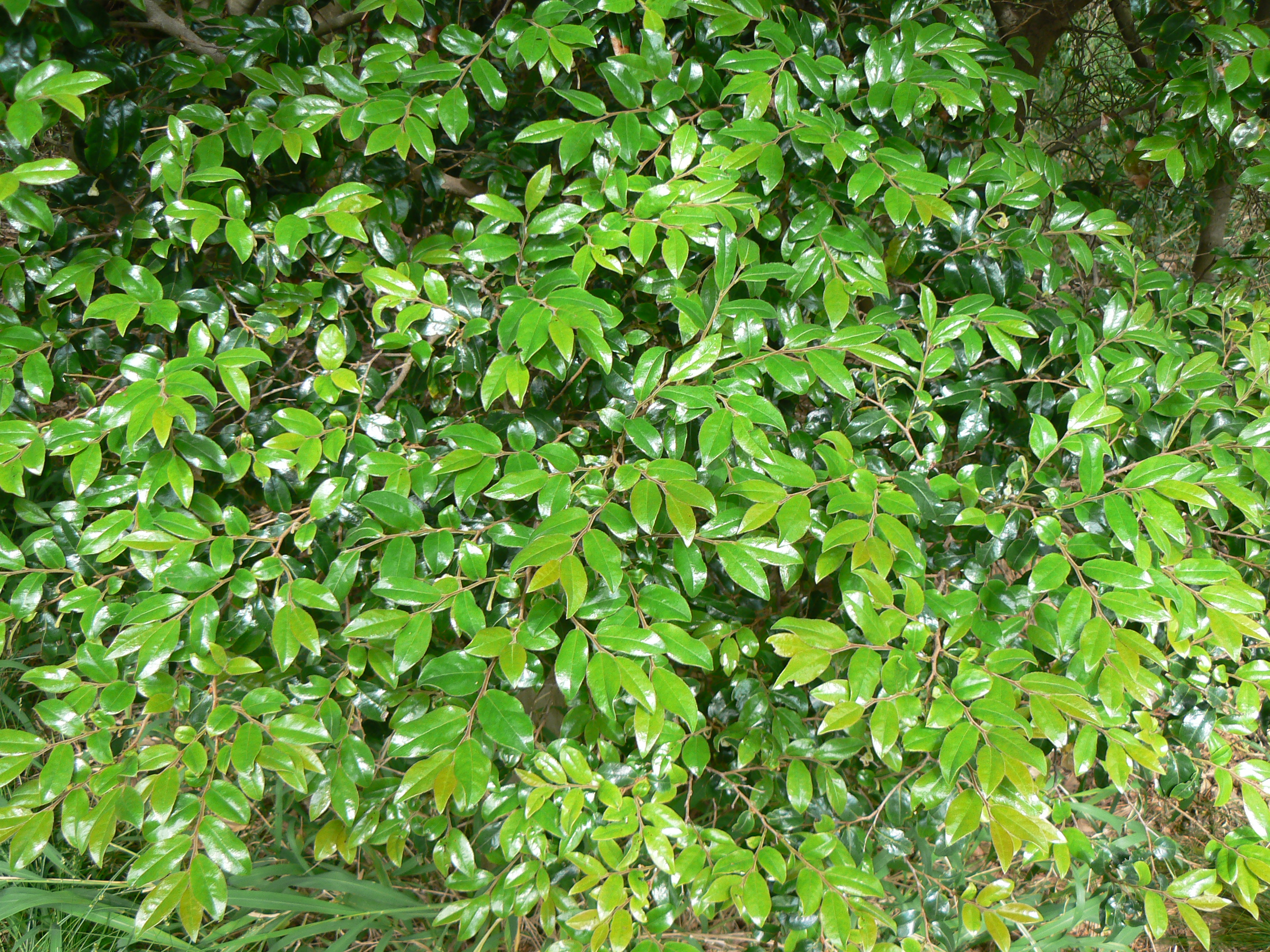
Detail of foliage

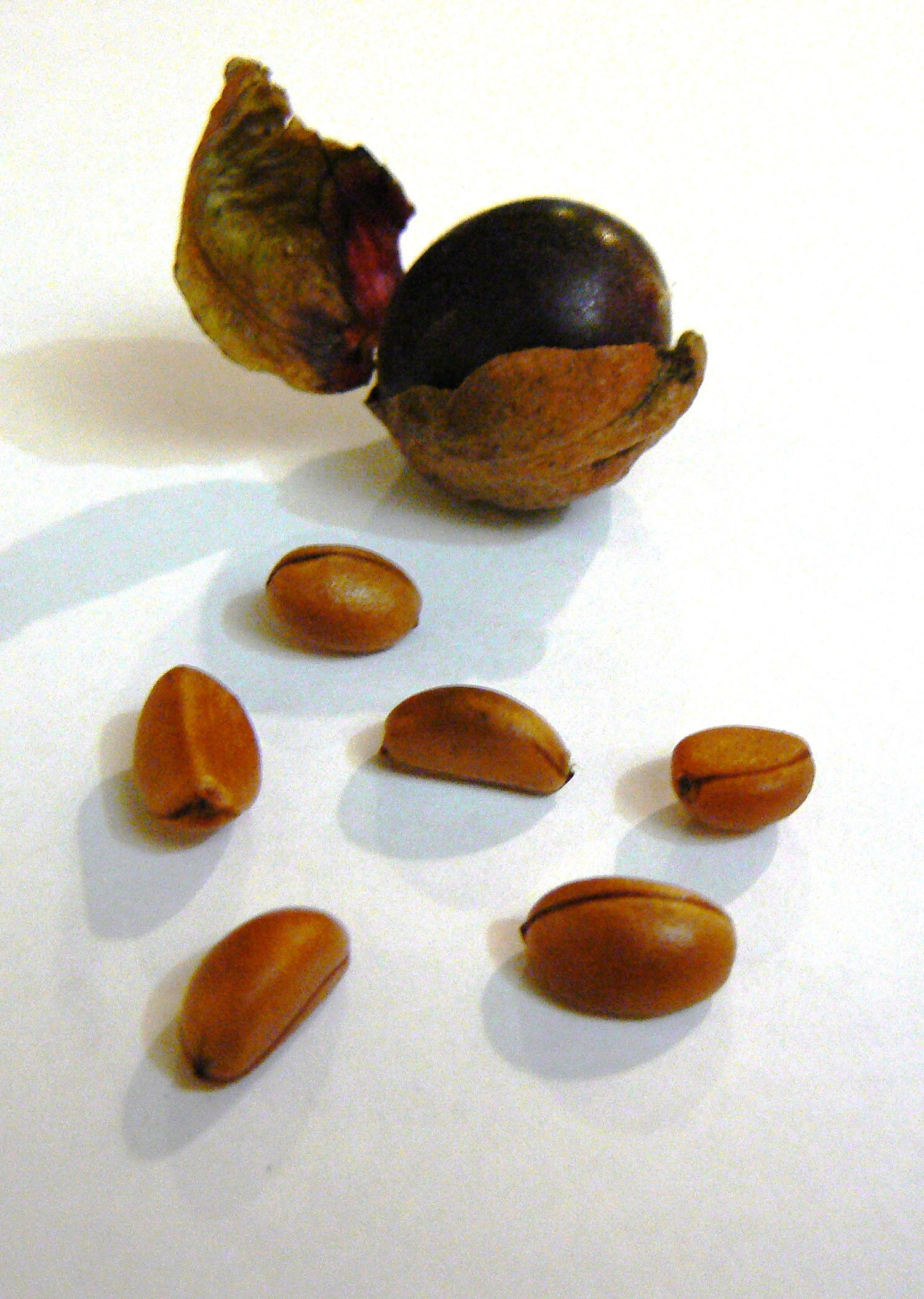
The fruits of the Bladdernut tree are enclosed in a paper-like sheath, while the seeds make a good coffee substitute when ground up.

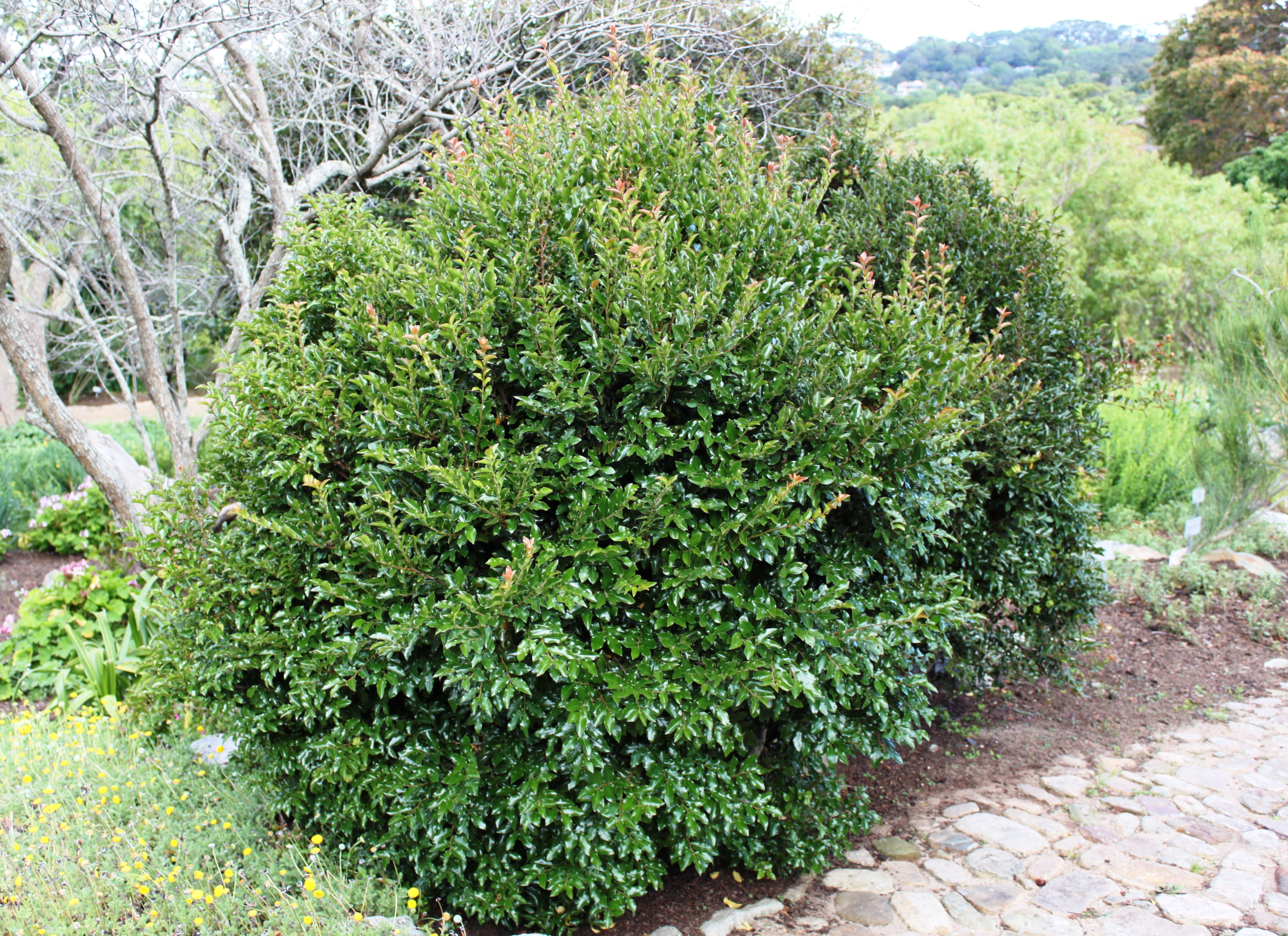
Diospyros can be pruned into a small bush.
