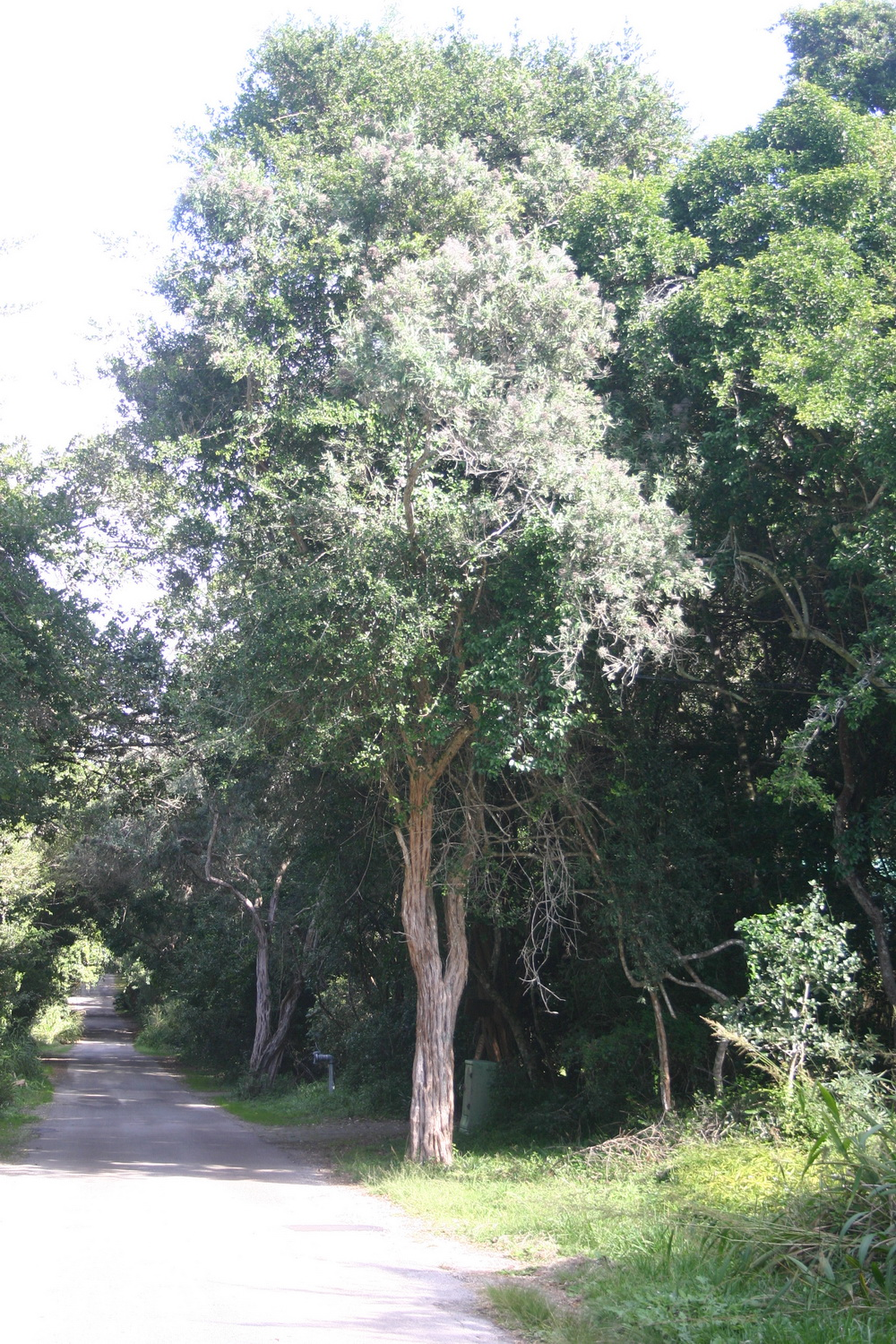

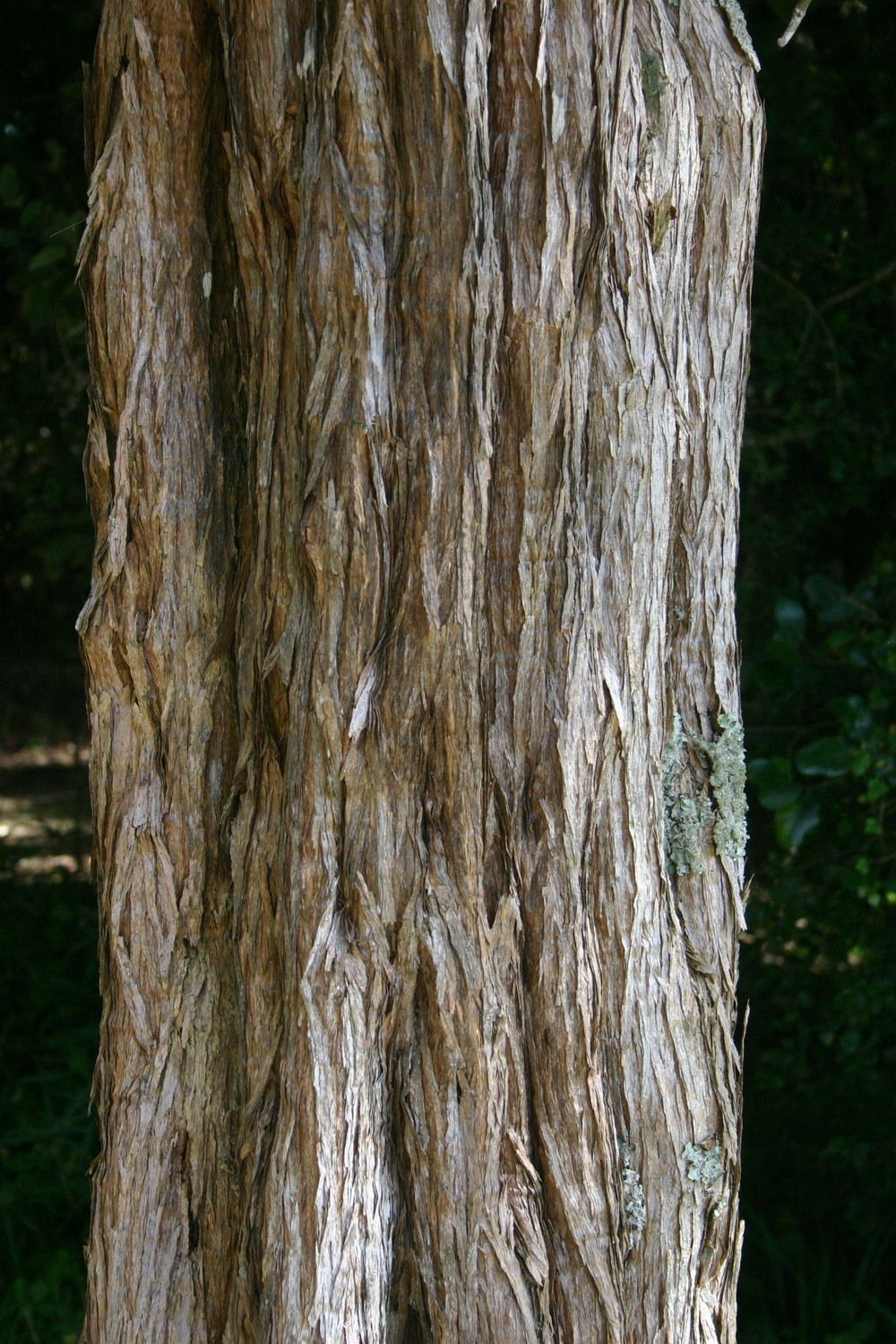

Scientific classification
- Kingdom: Plantae
- Clade: Tracheophytes
- Clade: Angiosperms
- Clade: Eudicots
- Clade: Asterids
- Order: Lamiales
- Family: Scrophulariaceae
- Genus: Buddleja
- Species: B. saligna

Binomial name
- Buddleja saligna Willd.

Synonyms
- Buddleja salicifolia Jacq.; Callicarpa paniculata Lam.; Chilianthus arboreus (L.f.), Benth.; Chilianthus arboreus var. rosmarinaceusO. Kuntze; Chilianthus oleaceus Burchell; Nuxia saligna (Willd.) Benth.; Semnos paniculata (Lam.) Rafinesque; Scoparia arborea L.

= Buddleja saligna =

False olive

Species of tree

Buddleja saligna, the false olive or bastard olive, is native to South Africa and Zimbabwe, where it has a wide distribution. It occurs most often in ravines and against outcrops, and is distributed from coastal elevations to the central plateau at elevations of < 2000 m. The species was first described and named by Willdenow in 1809.

== Description ==
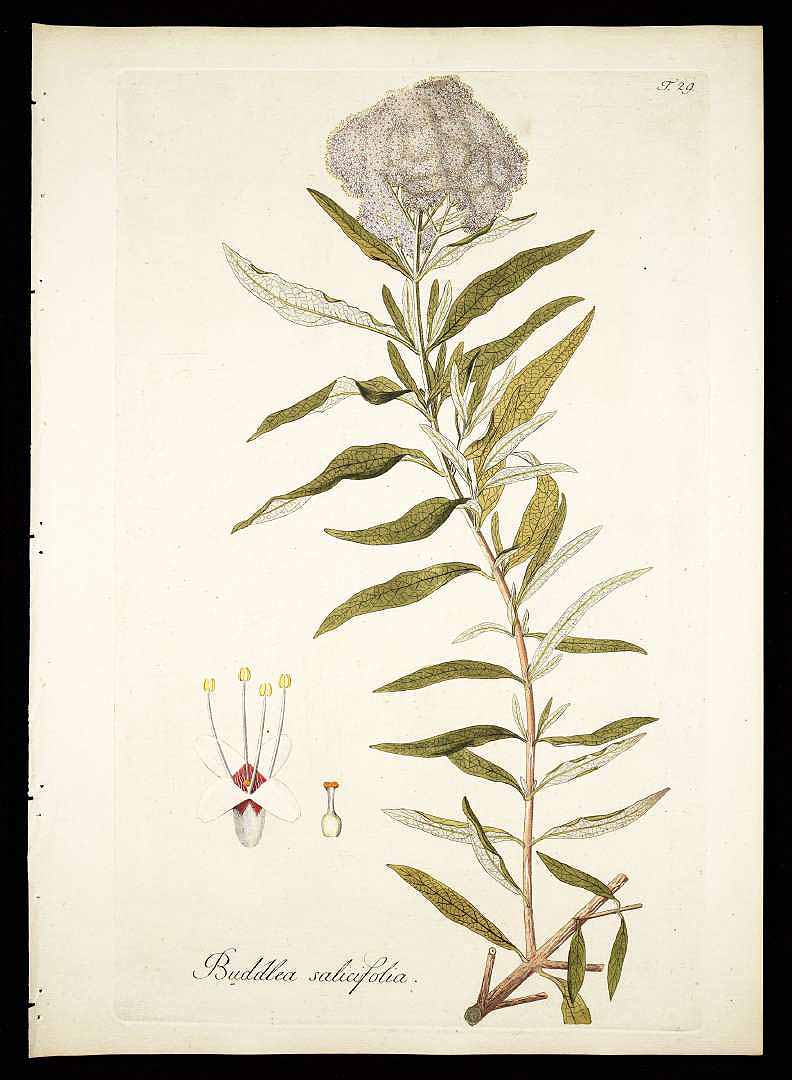
From "Plantarum rariorum horti caesarei Schoenbrunnensis" Nikolaus Joseph von Jacquin

Buddleja saligna is an evergreen shrub or small tree, growing < 15 m in height with a trunk diameter of 40 cm, and very similar to Salix and Olea. The bark becomes longitudinally furrowed with age. The branchlets are quadrangular in section, and winged. The opposite, subcoriaceous narrowly elliptic to linear leaves vary considerably in size and shape, from 1.2 – 15 cm long by 0.2 – 3 cm wide. The upper surface of the leaf is medium to dark green, glabrous and smooth, while the underside is clothed in pale stellate hairs. The honey-scented flowers are cream or white, occasionally with a reddish orange throat, appearing as large terminal heads 12 cm × 12 cm in spring and summer; the corollas are 4 mm in length. The dense timber (specific gravity 0.98) is of exceptionally high quality, though rarely found in sizes suitable for furniture.

== Cultivation ==
Buddleja saligna is hardy and frost resistant. In the UK, a specimen is grown as part of the NCCPG national collection held by Longstock Park Nursery, near Stockbridge, Hampshire. The shrub grows easily in well-drained soil, and is notably tolerant of drought. Hardiness: USDA zone 9.
