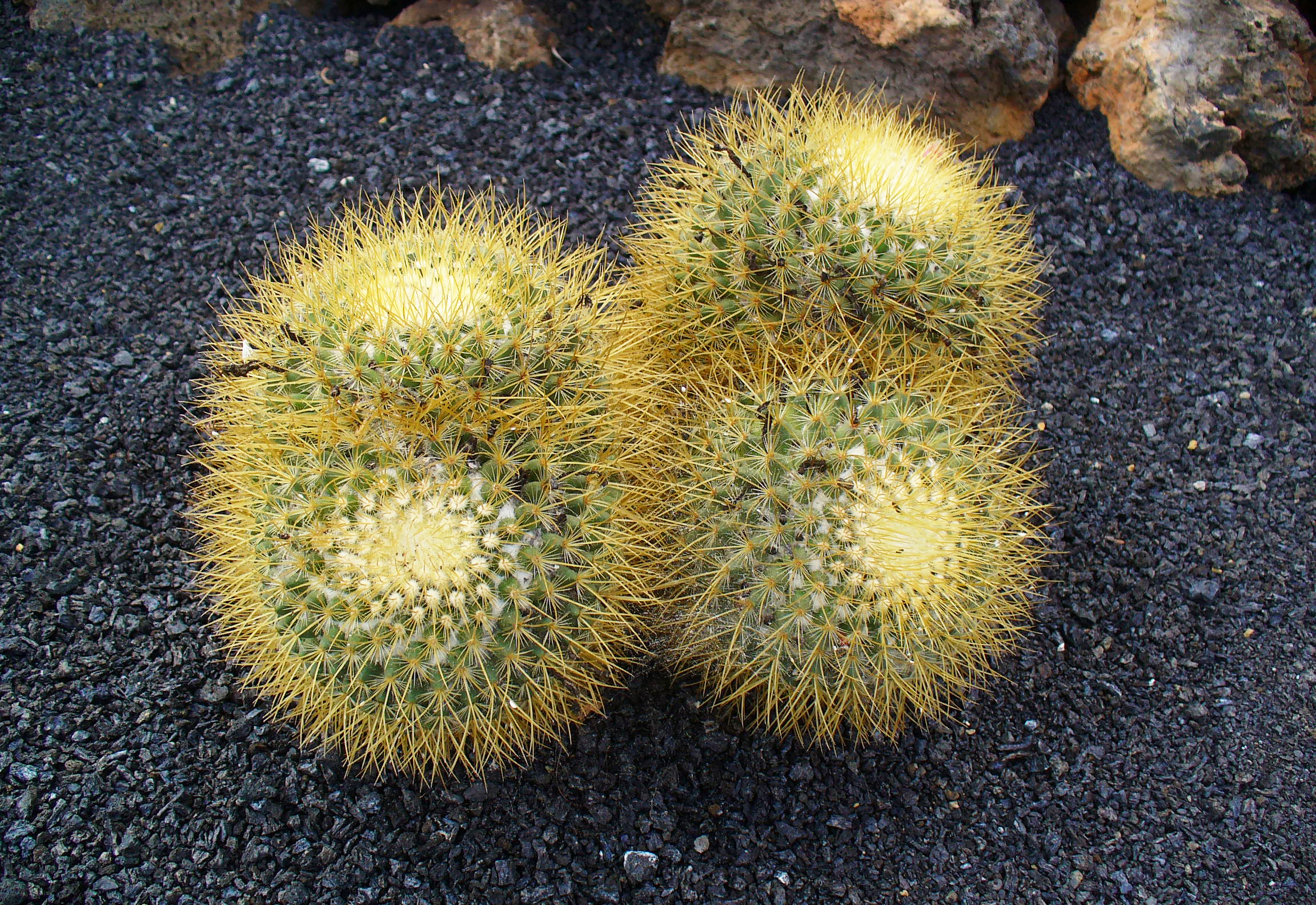
- Here given as Mammillaria rhodantha subsp. pringlei

Scientific classification
- Kingdom: Plantae
- Clade: Embryophytes
- Clade: Tracheophytes
- Clade: Angiosperms
- Clade: Eudicots
- Order: Caryophyllales
- Family: Cactaceae
- Subfamily: Cactoideae
- Genus: Mammillaria
- Species: M. pringlei

Binomial name
- Mammillaria pringlei (J.M.Coult.) K.Brandegee

Synonyms
- List: Cactus pringlei J.M.Coult.; Mammillaria parensis R.T.Craig; Mammillaria pringlei var. columnaris F.Schmoll ex R.T.Craig; Mammillaria pringlei var. longicentra Backeb.; Mammillaria rhodantha subsp. pringlei (J.M.Coult.) D.R.Hunt; Neomammillaria pringlei (J.M.Coult.) Britton & Rose

= Mammillaria pringlei =

Species of cactus

Mammillaria pringlei, called the lemon ball, is a species of cactus in the genus Mammillaria, native to Mexico, from Querétaro through to Veracruz and on to México State. It has gained the Royal Horticultural Society's Award of Garden Merit.
