= List of forests of the Western Cape =

This is a list of forests of the Western Cape province of South Africa.

== List of Forests in the Western Cape, South Africa ==
These are generally examples of Southern Afrotemperate Forest, the predominant indigenous forest-type in the Western Cape.

- Cecilia Forest
- Grabouw Forests
- Grootvadersbosch
- Kirstenbosch
- Knysna Forest
- Kogelberg
- Marloth Nature Reserve
- Newlands Forest
- Nuweberg Forest
- Orangekloof Forest
- Platbos
- Tokai Forest

== See also ==
- KwaZulu-Cape coastal forest mosaic
