= Cecilia, Table Mountain =

Section of the Table Mountain National Park

Coordinates: 34°00′05″S 18°24′56″E

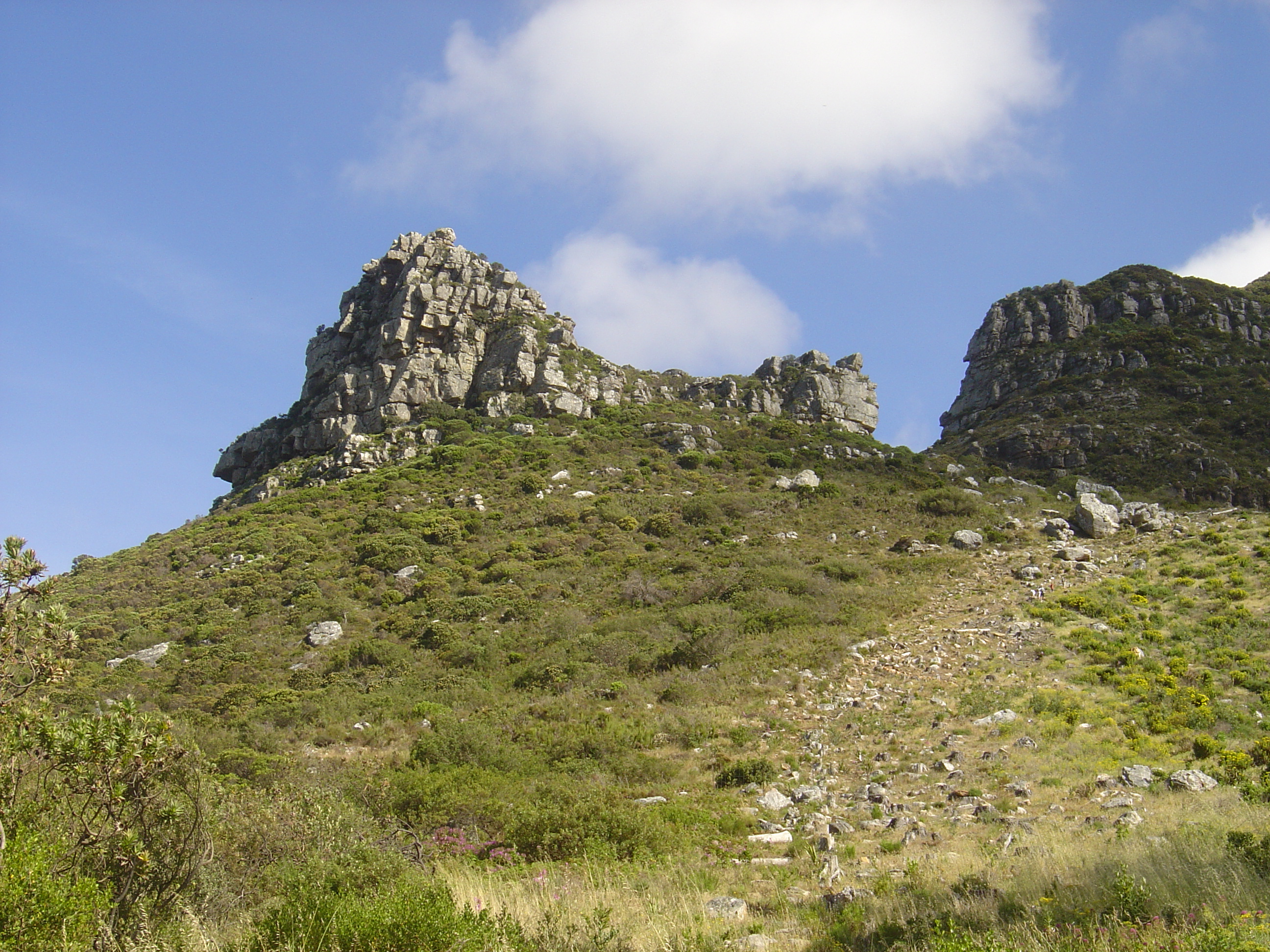
"Eagles Nest" Peak, near the southern edge of Cecilia Forest

Cecilia is a section of the Table Mountain National Park on the lower eastern slopes of Table Mountain in Cape Town, located just to the south of Kirstenbosch National Botanical Garden. It was previously used for commercial logging and known as Cecilia Forest or Cecilia Plantation, but has now been given protected status and integrated into the National Park.

== Name ==
It is not known what the original Khoisan inhabitants called this particular piece of land, but the early Dutch settlers knew these slopes as "Boschenheuwel". The name "Cecilia" derives from the first name of Cecil Rhodes who at one point owned the land.

== Location and layout ==
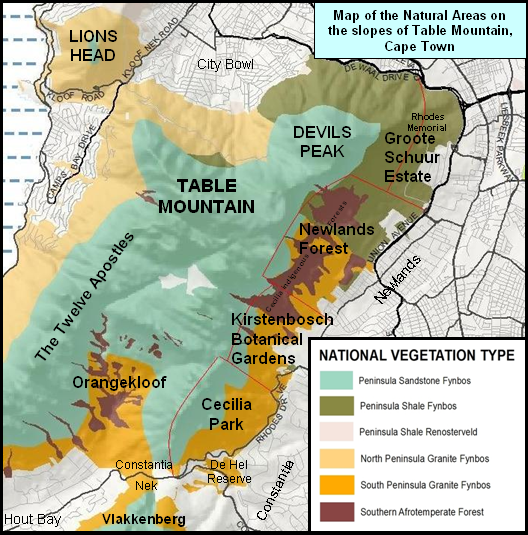
Map of the eastern slopes of Table Mountain, showing the Cecilia section of the Table Mountain National Park

Cecilia lies on the eastern lower slopes of Table Mountain, just to the south of Kirstenbosch National Botanical Garden and north of Constantia Nek and De Hel Nature Area, abutting the Cape Town suburb of Constantia to the east. It is located in an area of granite, and the undulating hilly slopes were naturally covered in Peninsula Granite Fynbos, with patches of Silvertree forest. The valleys that cut across the park would naturally have been filled with indigenous afro-temperate forest, and some still partially are. Today, large parts of the park are still covered in uniform plantations of Pine and Gum trees, relicts from the days of commercial logging.

The park itself stretches in a thick band, from the north-east to the south-west. The car-park and main entrance is located at the north-eastern corner near the border with Kirstenbosch. The buildings of the forest station are a bit further up the slope. From the main entrance, the most popular walk follows a circular road, along the length of the park towards the south-western corner (near the other entrance at Constantia Nek) and then turns back making a complete loop. This road was originally built for the management and harvesting of the commercial plantations.

The high Contour Path (running in a loop around the whole mountain) can be accessed from the upper slopes, where there are impressive views out over Cape Town and the expanses of the Cape Flats. The Diep River has its origins in the mountain slopes above Cecilia, in a large gorge – replete with a waterfall – that is beginning to fill again with indigenous forest. The highest peak on the slopes above Cecilia is Klaasenkop (or Klassenkop).

== Natural flora ==
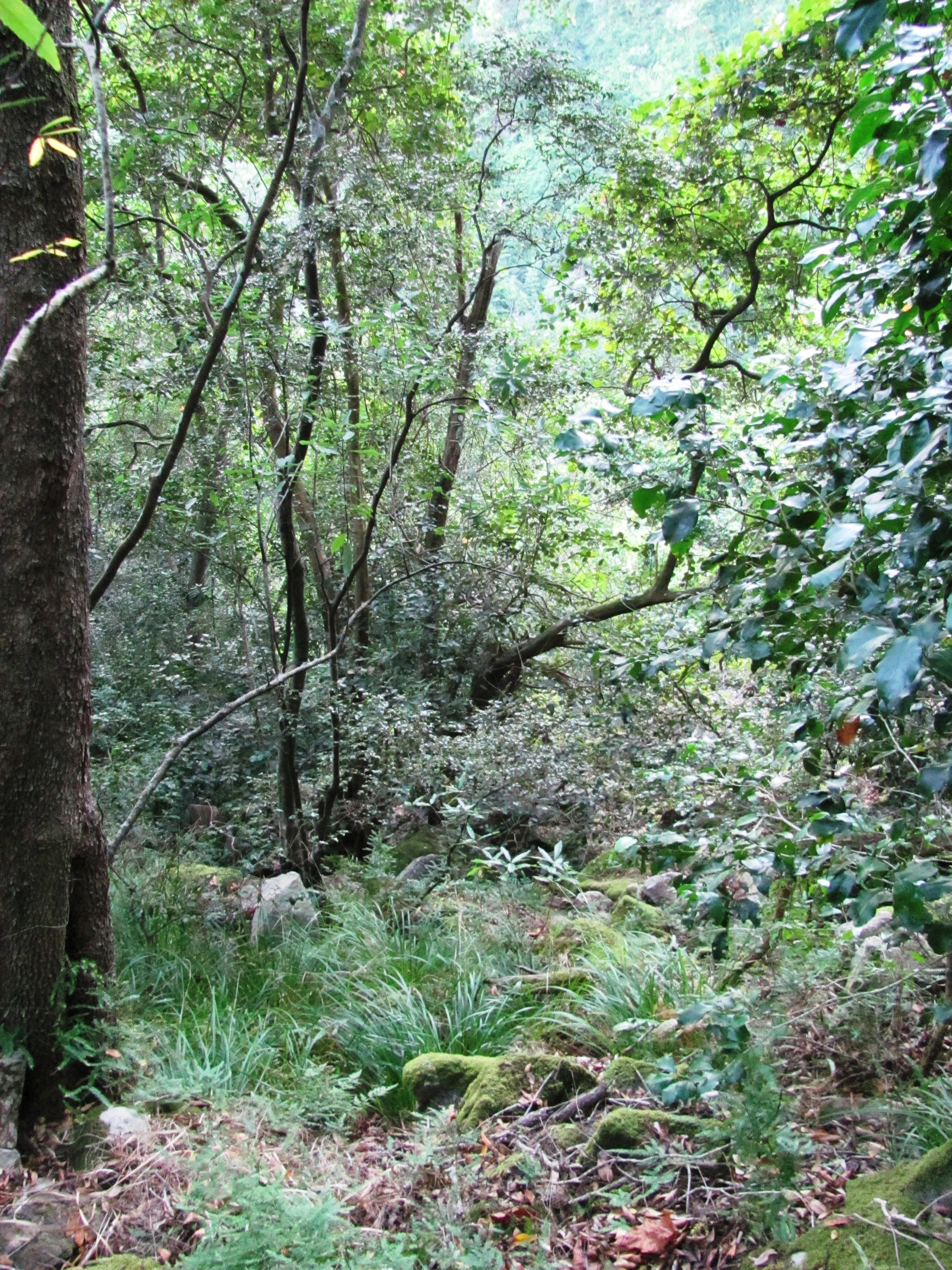
Indigenous Afro-temperate forest still survives in sheltered kloofs higher on the mountain slopes

The natural ecosystem of the area is Peninsula Granite Fynbos, a critically endangered vegetation type that occurs nowhere else in the world. Mature Peninsula Granite Fynbos is dominated by large tree-Proteas, such as the Silvertree, the Tree Pincushion-Protea and the Waboom, and a dense underlayer of Asteraceous (daisy) species. Interspersed in the fynbos, rocky scree slopes are home to indigenous trees such as Pock-Ironwood, Kiggelaria, Camphor trees, Maurocenia and Candlewood trees. There are a variety of plant species (some already extinct) which are naturally restricted to this specific vegetation type, occurring nowhere else in the world. The primary threat to this ecosystem is invasive alien plants, such as European Pines and Australian Port Jackson Acacia.

On the steep upper slopes and mountain-tops is Peninsula Sandstone Fynbos, a less severely endangered vegetation type with a different range of species, including a vast number of endemics. This tiny ecosystem (restricted to the upper slopes of Table Mountain) has an extraordinarily rich biodiversity, with roughly the same number of plant species as can be found in the whole of the United Kingdom.

In addition, smaller patches of indigenous Afro-temperate forest survive in the river valleys. Such areas that are protected from the seasonal fires of fynbos, become dominated by massive trees such as Yellowwoods, Ironwoods, Assegai trees, Olinias, African Waterboom, Rooi-els, Boekenhout and Spoonwood trees.

== History ==
The original inhabitants of the area were undoubtedly the Khoi, who would have herded their cattle through the local forests and fynbos up until the arrival of the Dutch colonists in the 1700s and the beginning of the colonial era.

Cecil Rhodes bought this land in the 1890s resulting in him owning nearly the entire eastern flank of the Table Mountain range. Colonists such as Cecil John Rhodes often strove to change the Cape landscape to make it more resemble that of Europe. This was done through the clearing of indigenous fynbos and afro-temperate forest, together with the introduction of European species such as deer and starlings, and the wholesale replanting of much of the Cape Peninsula with European trees such as Oaks, Birches and Pines.

Commercial logging took off across the Cape Peninsula in the 19th century, after most of the remaining indigenous forests were felled. Fast-growing tree species such as Eucalyptus and Pinus radiata were chosen, and imported for cultivation. However, in the 20th century these plantations became less profitable as far larger sources of lumber became available. The company which owns the current and final crop of trees is due to harvest them in phases over the next few years, the original flora and fauna will be re-introduced and the park will be integrated into the main body of Table Mountain National Park.

== Restoration to a conservation area ==
Since 2007, SANParks has undertaken to re-establish Cecilia as a conservation area integrated with the Table Mountain National Park. The indigenous and critically endangered Peninsula Granite Fynbos have been restored over several years and Silvertrees allowed to return along with other large Proteas, and non-invasive indigenous trees will be replanted along the more popular paths and in the valleys, to provide shade to walkers.

The plan is for a park with intermittent patches of Protea-fynbos and shady indigenous forest. Pine and Gum trees remaining from the plantations will be kept in several patches – but will need to be regularly controlled from spreading, as they are highly invasive.

== See also ==
- Constantia Nek
