= List of forests of South Africa =

This is a list of forests in South Africa.

== List of forests of South Africa ==
Name of forest	Type	Province	Note
Andrews Forest	State	Eastern Cape	
Blue Lily's Bush Forest	Reserve	Eastern Cape	
Dhlinza Forest		KwaZulu-Natal	
Entumeni Forest		KwaZulu-Natal	
Gilboa Forest		KwaZulu-Natal	
Hankey Forest	State	Eastern Cape	
Hawaan Forest		KwaZulu-Natal	
Hlabeni Forest		KwaZulu-Natal	
Hlatikhulu Forest		KwaZulu-Natal	
Hogsback Forest	State	Eastern Cape	
Inyarha (Nyara) Forest	Reserve	Eastern Cape	
Isidenge Forest	State	Eastern Cape	
Karkloof Forest		KwaZulu-Natal	
Katberg Forest	State	Eastern Cape	
Knysna-Amatole montane forests		Western Cape	
Kologha Forest	Reserve	Eastern Cape	
Koomans Bush	State reserve	Eastern Cape	
Kruisrivier Forest	Reserve	Eastern Cape	
Kubusi Indigenous Forest	State	Eastern Cape	
Longmore Forest	State	Eastern Cape	
Lottering Forest	Reserve	Eastern Cape	
Ncandu Forest		KwaZulu-Natal	
Newlands Forest		Western Cape	
Nkandla Forest		KwaZulu-Natal	
Ngome Forest		KwaZulu-Natal	
Ongoye Forest		KwaZulu-Natal	
Plaatbos Forest	Nature reserve	Eastern Cape	
Qudeni Forest		KwaZulu-Natal	
Robbe Hoek Forest	Reserve	Eastern Cape	
Sileza Forest		KwaZulu-Natal	
Soada Forest		KwaZulu-Natal	
Storms River Forest		Eastern Cape	part of the Tsitsikamma National Park
Tuduma Forest		KwaZulu-Natal	
Umgano Forest		KwaZulu-Natal	
Welbedacht Forest	State	Eastern Cape	
Weza Forest		KwaZulu-Natal	
Witelsbos Forest	State	Eastern Cape	
Xalingena Forest		KwaZulu-Natal	

== See also ==
- Forests of KwaZulu-Natal
- Forests of the Eastern Cape
- Forests of the Western Cape
- Protected areas of South Africa
