= Orange Kloof =

Coordinates: 34°0′8″S 18°23′22″E

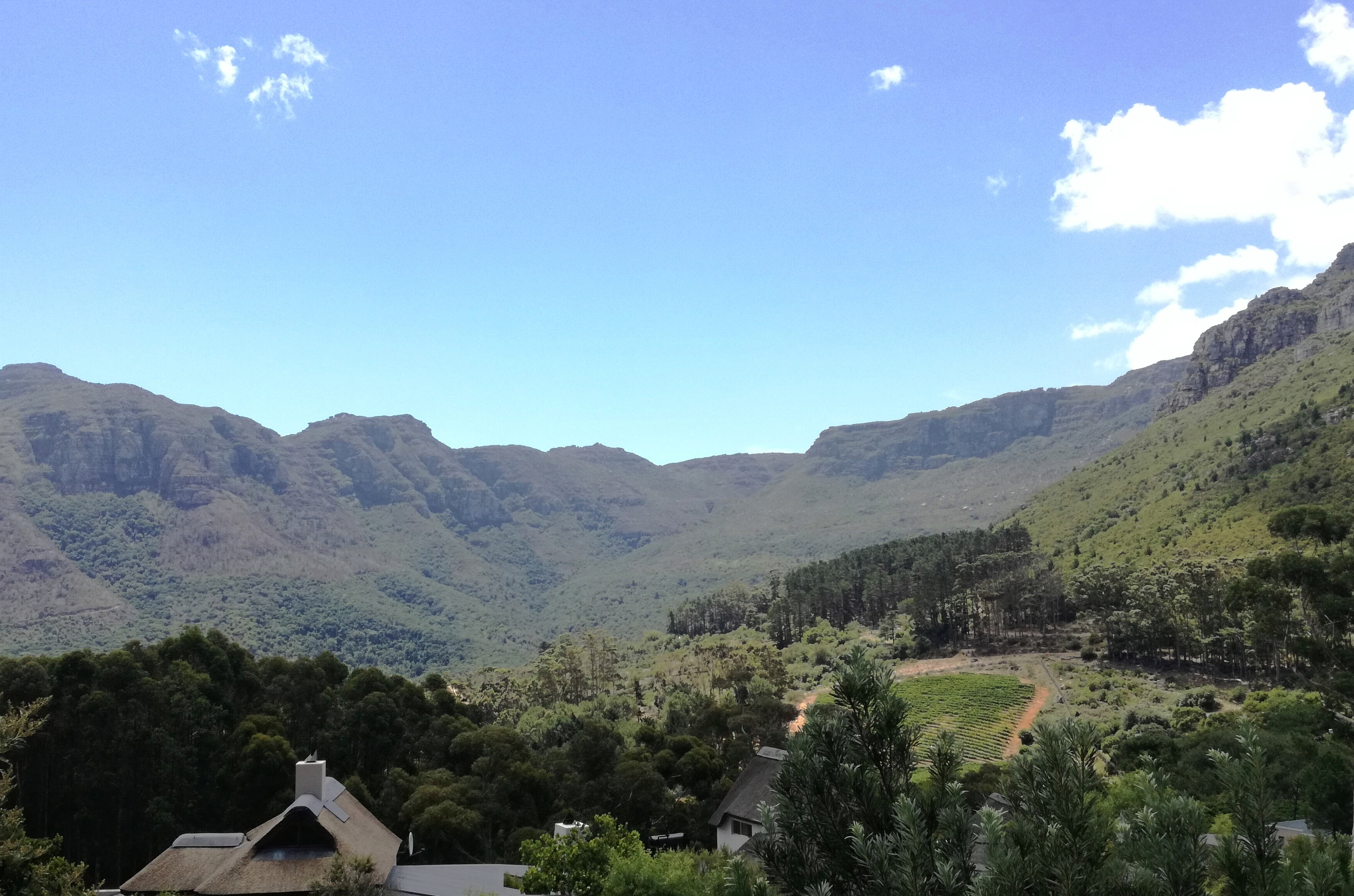
Orange Kloof. The forested valley viewed, from the south.

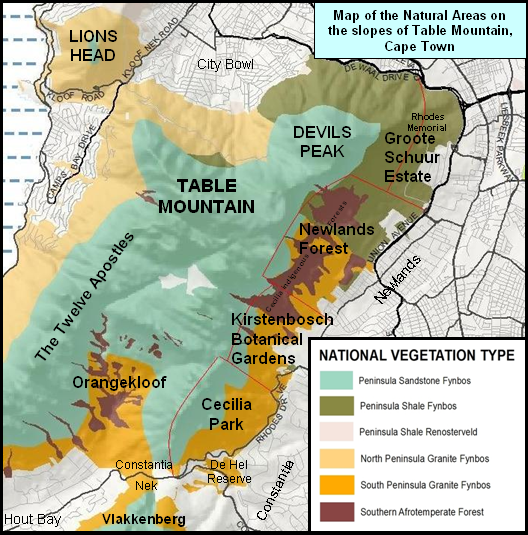
Orangekloof and adjacent natural areas on Table Mountain

Orange Kloof is an area of Table Mountain National Park in Cape Town, South Africa.

It is located at the northern end of the Hout Bay valley, just to the west of Cecilia Park. It is a conservation area with highly restricted access, vegetated by indigenous Afro-temperate forest and endangered Peninsula Granite Fynbos.

Orange Kloof is believed to have derived its name from the bark of the orange-coloured saffron trees that were prevalent in Hout Bay at the time.
