= De Hel Nature Area =

Nature reserve by Cape Town, South Africa

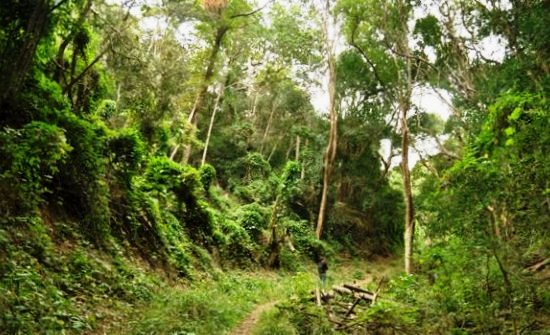
- Indigenous forest at De Hel Nature Area. Cape Town.

- Location within Cape Town
- Location: Cape Town, South Africa
- Coordinates: 34.01271°S 18.42015°E
- Area: 21.3 ha (53 acres)

De Hel Nature Area is a 21.3-hectare (53-acre) nature reserve protecting a river valley and indigenous forest on the lower eastern slopes of Table Mountain, Cape Town, South Africa.

== Ecology ==
The Spaanschemat River is surrounded by steep slopes that are covered in deep indigenous Southern Afrotemperate Forest. At the lower end of the reserve is an open piece of land known as “the Meadow” where fruit trees remain from earlier cultivation.

The vegetation type is Afromontane forest, with areas of Peninsula Granite Fynbos. Several hundred plant species have been identified here, including the striking Silvertree (Leucadendron argenteum) and Erica phylicaefolia. The reserve is also home to a variety of local wild animals, including endangered birds like the Knysna warbler (Bradypterus sylvaticus), and the endangered Western Leopard Toad (Amietophrynus pantherinus). Invasive alien plants are a problem; as such weeds threaten both the indigenous forest and the fynbos.

== History ==
Ancient trails used by Khoi-khoi herders ran through this patch of land, and when the Dutch arrived they established a woodcutter's post here. Subsequently, its forests became known as a retreat for runaway slaves. For this, as well as for environmental reasons, in March 2012 the provincial heritage resources authority, Heritage Western Cape declared De Hel a provincial heritage site in the terms of Section 27 of the National Heritage Resources Act. This provides the site with the highest form of protection under South African heritage law.

== See also ==
- Biodiversity of Cape Town
- List of nature reserves in Cape Town
- Southern Afrotemperate Forest
- Peninsula Granite Fynbos
