= List of forests of the Eastern Cape =

This is a list of forests located in the Eastern Cape, a province of South Africa.

== List of Forests in the Eastern Cape, South Africa ==
- Amatole Forest
- Dwesa
- Tsitsikamma Forest

== See also ==
- KwaZulu-Cape coastal forest mosaic
