= Southern Afrotemperate Forest =

Main indigenous forest-type in the south-western part of South Africa

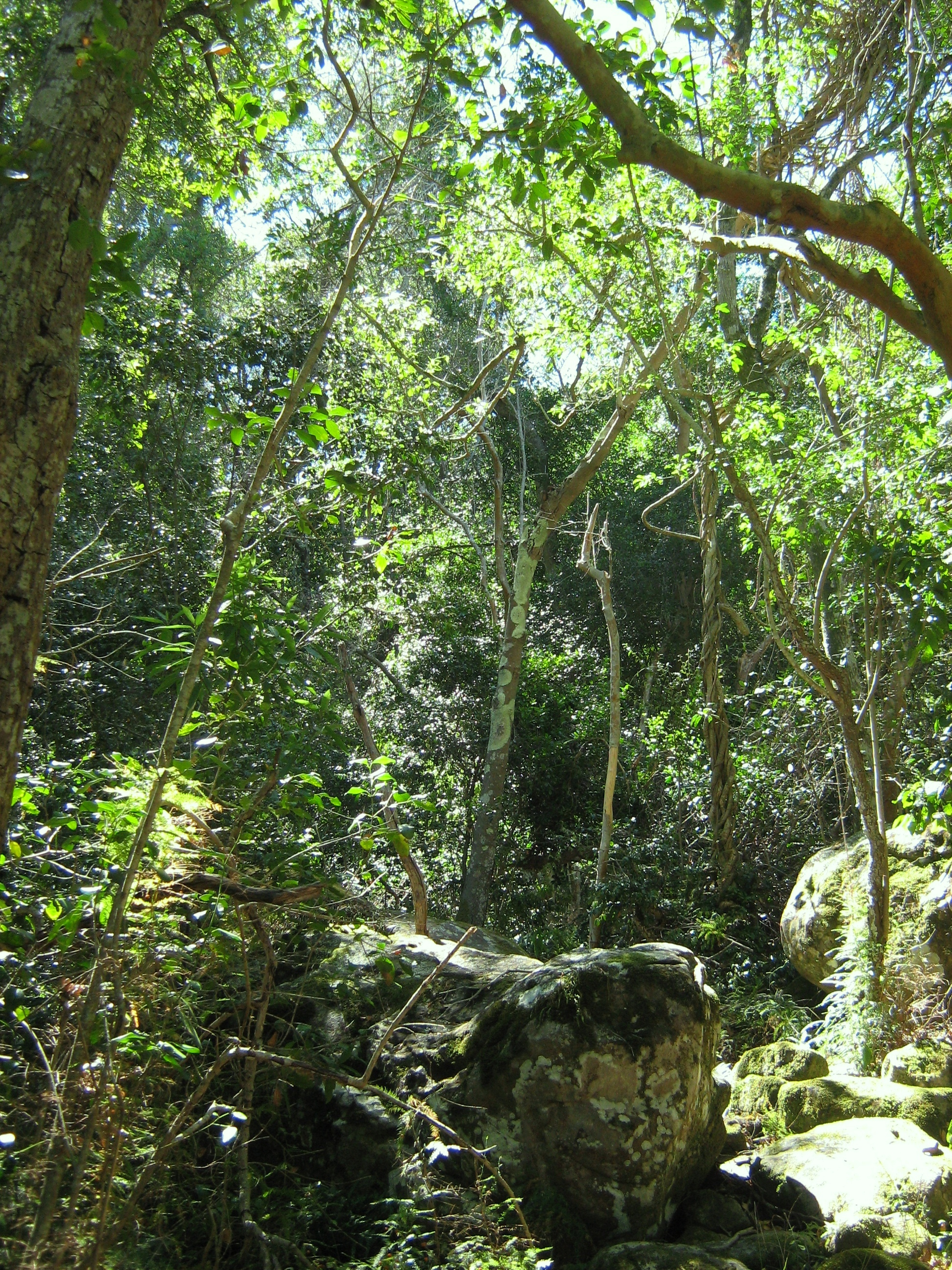
Southern Afrotemperate Forest growing on the eastern slopes of Table Mountain

Southern Afrotemperate Forest (the Southern Cape Forests) is a kind of tall, shady, multilayered indigenous South African forest. This is the main forest-type in the south-western part of South Africa, naturally extending from the Cape Peninsula in the west, as far as Port Elizabeth in the east. In this range (apart from the massive Knysna-Tsitsikamma forest complex), it usually occurs in small forest pockets, surrounded by fynbos vegetation.

== Ecology ==
This forest ecosystem is a subtype of the general Afromontane forest, which can be found across Africa as far north as Ethiopia. However, it is distinguished from other types of forests in Southern Africa by its relatively distinct range of species and its being confined to the far south-western tip of Africa – separated from the other forested areas to the east and north. Southern Afrotemperate Forest tends to grow on soils derived from sandstone and granite which are the dominant rock formations in the south-western Cape.

The Western Cape is prone to seasonal fires and the various types of fynbos vegetation that dominate here are all governed by the fire cycles. However, Southern Afrotemperate Forest is not adapted to fire, so is always restricted to "fire refugia" such as gorges, wet riverine areas, or rocky scree slopes where fires cannot reach. In the absence of veld fires, the taller forests tend to expand at the expense of the fynbos.

== Subdivisions ==
It is conventionally divided into three closely related subtypes:

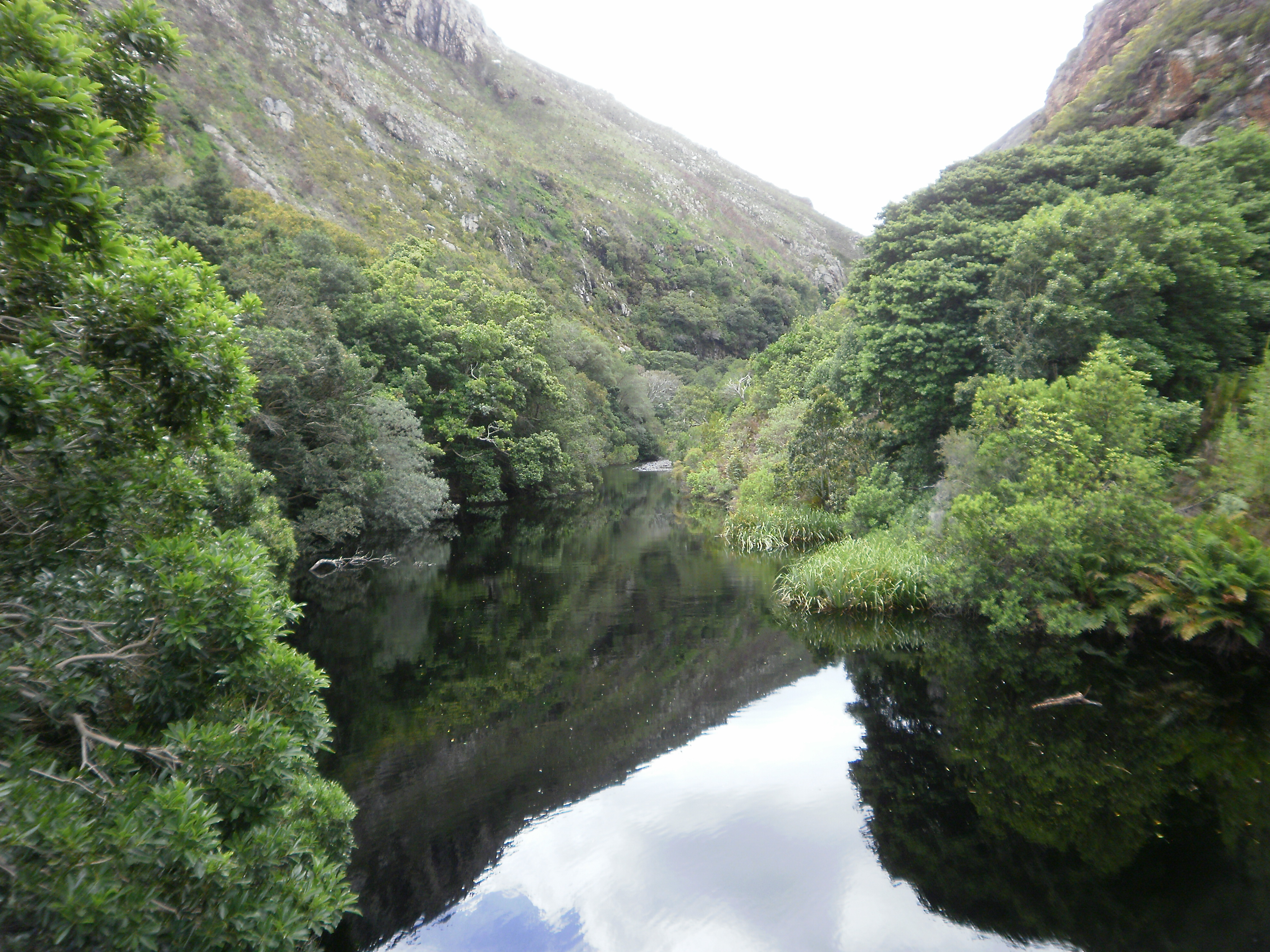
Western Cape Talus growing near Betty's Bay

=== Western Cape Talus ===
This is a type of medium-height scree forest usually only found in small patches, growing on steep, rocky slopes and by mountain streams. It is endemic to the Western Cape.
Based on location and the species composition of the forests, this type is often informally divided into riverine forests (oewerbos in Afrikaans) and scree forests (dasbos in Afrikaans). The species composition of these two subtypes differs slightly, but they are still similar enough to be classed together as an ecosystem. The dominant, largest, and most obvious tree species are Metrosideros angustifolia, Brabejum stellatifolium, Cassine schinoides, Apodytes dimidiata, Cunonia capensis, Ilex mitis, Kiggelaria africana, Rapanea melanophloeos, Olinia ventosa, and Podocarpus elongatus.

Western Cape Talus forests naturally undergo periodic disturbance, flooding in the case of riverine forests, and rock-slides in the case of scree forests. Swift regeneration immediately follows. The natural cycle of disturbance of the surrounding fynbos vegetation is fire-driven, but this has little effect on the sheltered talus forests.

The main threats to this ecosystem are from invasive alien plants, especially black wattle trees. The natural habitat of Western Cape Talus is usually within catchment areas, and they thus perform an important function in regulating the water-systems and preventing erosion. They are also host to many scenic hiking trails and have value as a source of medicinal plants. In addition, several species (such as Clivia mirabilis and Cryptocarya angustifolia) are endemic to these forests and occur nowhere else in the world.

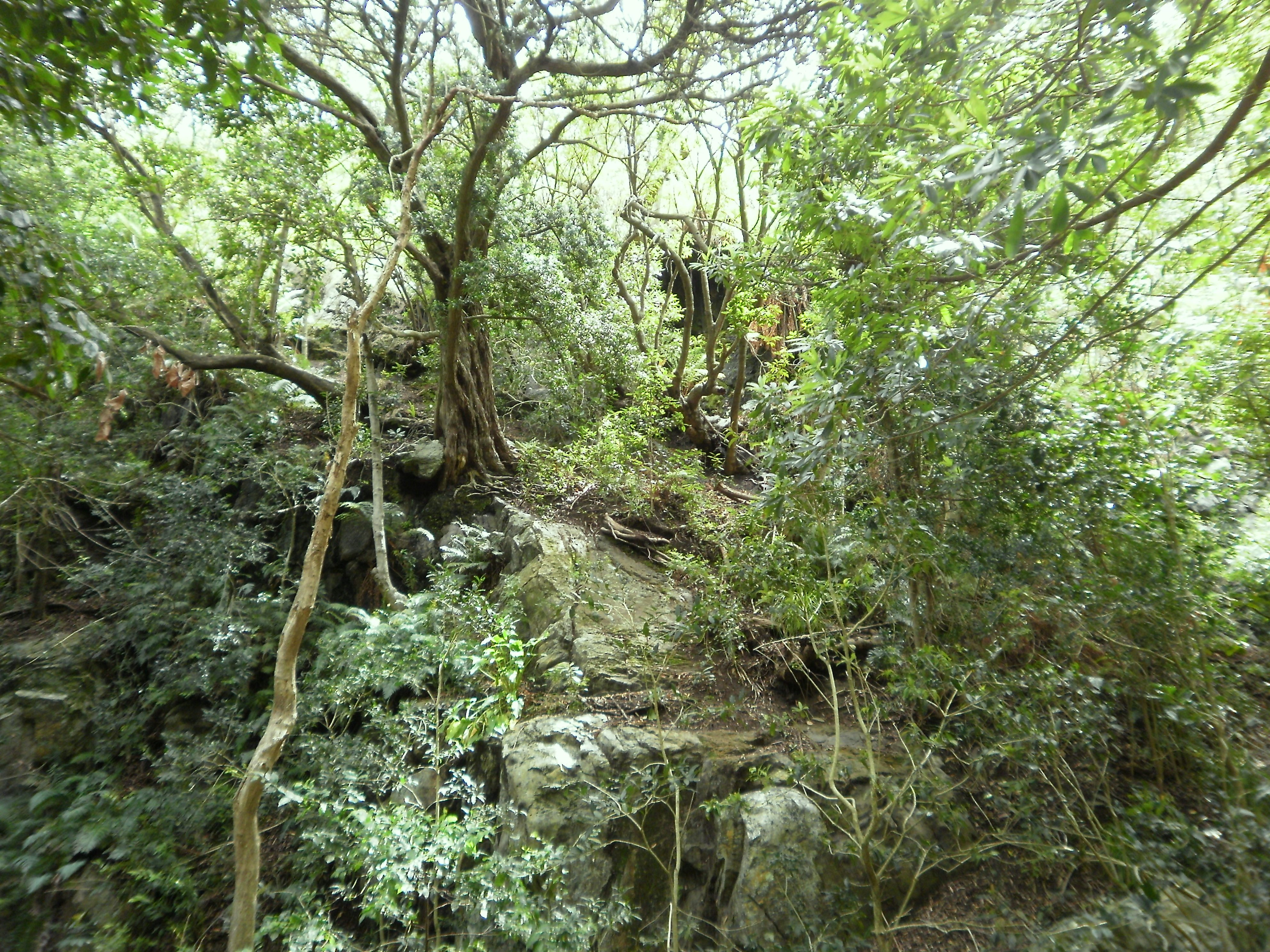
Western Cape Afrotemperate forest growing at Newlands Forest in Cape Town

=== Western Cape Afrotemperate ===
The thicker, deeper, denser "South-western Cape forests" are dominated by larger afromontane trees. These tall woodlands are typically found in sheltered gorges and mountainous areas in the Western Cape.

They also include the Cape Peninsula Forests such as those at Newlands Forest, Kirstenbosch, and Orangekloof, which are all located around Table Mountain, within the city of Cape Town.

Typical species include massive trees such as yellowwoods, Ilex mitis, Kiggelaria africana, Assegai trees, ironwoods, Cunonia capensis, Cassine species, Olinia ventosa, and Rapanea melanophloeos, which form the highest canopy; smaller trees such as Halleria lucida, Diospyros whyteana, and Maytenus acuminata, which form a medium layer; as well as a variety of ferns, herbs, bushes, vines, and lianas (e.g. Asparagus scandens, Rhoicissus tomentosa). Though not as rich in biodiversity as the Southern Cape Afrotemperate forests, these woodlands still contain a variety of endemic plants and animals which occur nowhere else in the world.

The major threats come from invasive alien plants such as Australian cheesewood, bugweed, black wattle, lantana, privet, and pine trees. Western Cape Afrotemperate forests have a high socioeconomic value, due to their use for recreation such as hiking, their role in preserving the Western Cape's water supply, and their natural production of an enormous range of medicinal plants.

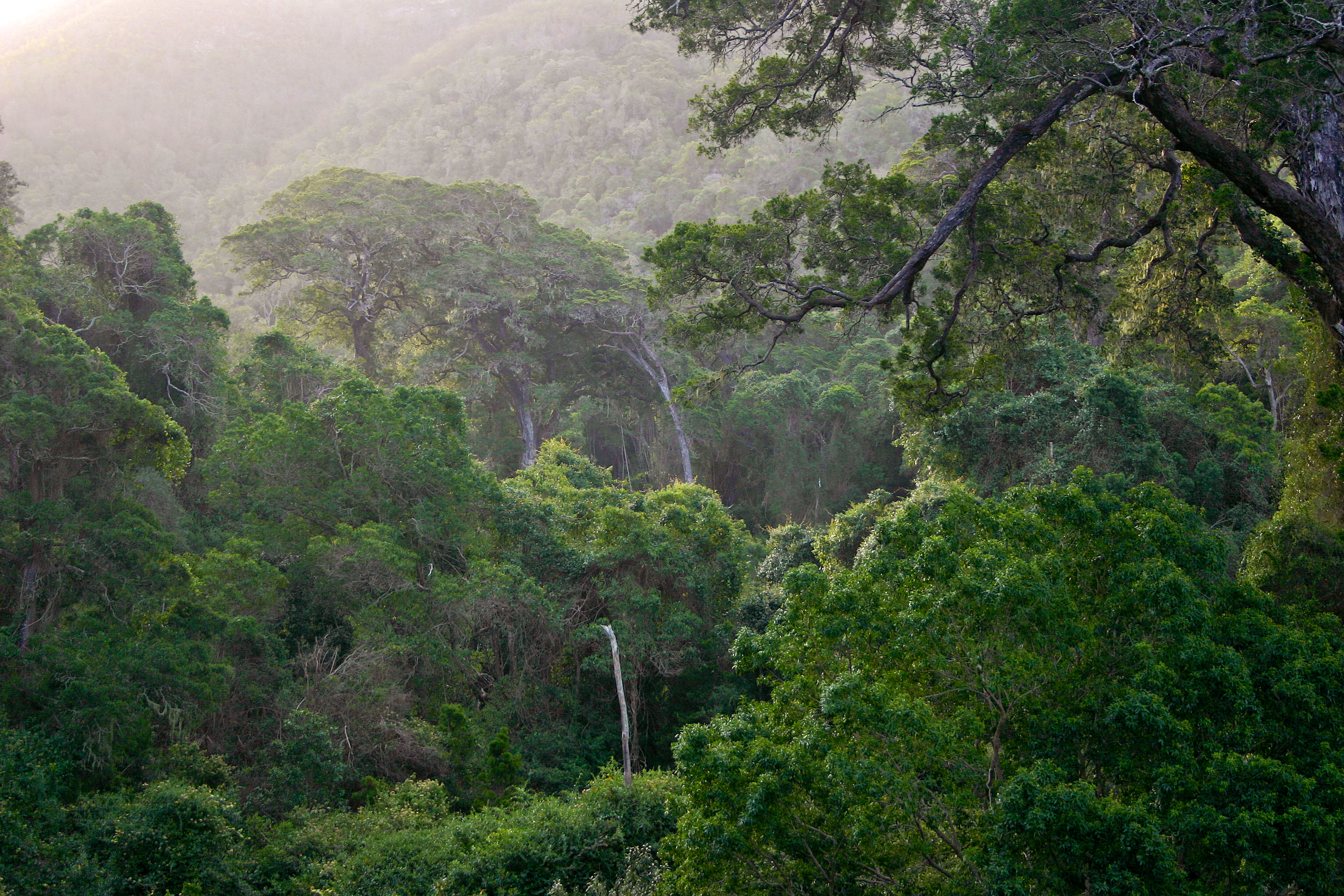
Southern Cape Afrotemperate forest near Knysna

=== Southern Cape Afrotemperate ===
By far, the largest portion of Southern Afrotemperate Forest includes the enormous Knysna-Tsitsikamma forests. It extends from Mossel Bay in the Western Cape, eastwards into the Eastern Cape, nearly as far as Port Elizabeth.

This is a tall, dense, species-rich forest in a moist and warm temperate climate. The highest canopy is formed from the intermeshed crowns of the most massive trees. Understories are formed from medium-sized, multitrunked trees and the forest floor is home to a range of indigenous shrubs, bushes, ferns, and flowers. Enormous lianas and vines reach up to the canopy and between the branches and a variety of animals inhabit these woods. This forest is very similar to Western Cape Afrotemperate Forest with a very high species overlap; however, it also has some lesser similarities with the Amatole mistbelt forests that lie further to the east in the Drakensberg mountain range. Previously, large game was abundant, but today it is largely exterminated. A single elephants survives in the Knysna Forest.

It is often subdivided into three smaller vegetation types: the Southern Cape Mountain forest, Coastal-Platform, and Scarp forests.

== Species ==
Some of the major indigenous tree species:

- Podocarpus falcatus (Outeniqua yellowwood)
- Podocarpus latifolius (real yellowwood)
- Podocarpus elongatus (Breede River yellowwood)
- Apodytes dimidiata (white pear)
- Brabejum stellatifolium (Cape wild almond)
- Celtis africana (white stinkwood)
- Chionanthus foveolatus (pock ironwood)
- Curtisia dentata (Assegai tree)
- Diospyros whyteana (bladdernut tree)
- Grewia occidentalis (Cross-berry tree)
- Halleria lucida (notsung)
- Ilex mitis (Cape holly)
- Kiggelaria africana (wild peach)
- Maytenus acuminata (silky bark tree)
- Cassine peragua (forest spoonwood)
- Canthium inerme (turkeyberry tree)
- Cunonia capensis (butterspoon tree)
- Ocotea bullata (black stinkwood)
- Olea capensis subsp. macrocarpa (ironwood tree)
- Olinia ventosa (hard pear)
- Nuxia floribunda (forest nuxia)
- Cyathea capensis (forest tree fern)
- Cyathea dregei (common tree fern)
- Pterocelastrus tricuspidatus (candlewood)
- Rapanea melanophloeos (Cape beech)
- Virgilia (blossom tree)
Some other important species
1. Gonioma kamassi
2. Heeria argentea
3. Metrosideros angustifolia
4. Platylophus trifoliatus
5. Trichocladus crinitus
6. Burchellia bubalina
7. Oplismenus hirtellus
8. Dietes iridioides
9. Blechnum capense
10. Lomariocycas tabularis
11. Rumohra adiantiformis
Some endemic species
1. Podocarpus elongatus
2. Platycarpos trifoliatus
3. Cassine schinoides
4. Cryptocarya angustifolia
5. Metrosideros angustifolia
6. Virgilia oroboides subsp. ferruginea
7. Strelitzia alba
8. Clivia mirabilis
9. Schoenoxiphium album
10. Amauropelta knysnaensis
11. Polystichum incongruum
12. Breutelia elliptica
13. Breutelia tabularis
14. Distichophyllum mniifolium
15. Fissidens fasciculatus
16. Macromitrium macropelma
17. Ulota ecklonii
18. Wardia hygrometrica
19. Zygodon leptobolax

== Gallery ==
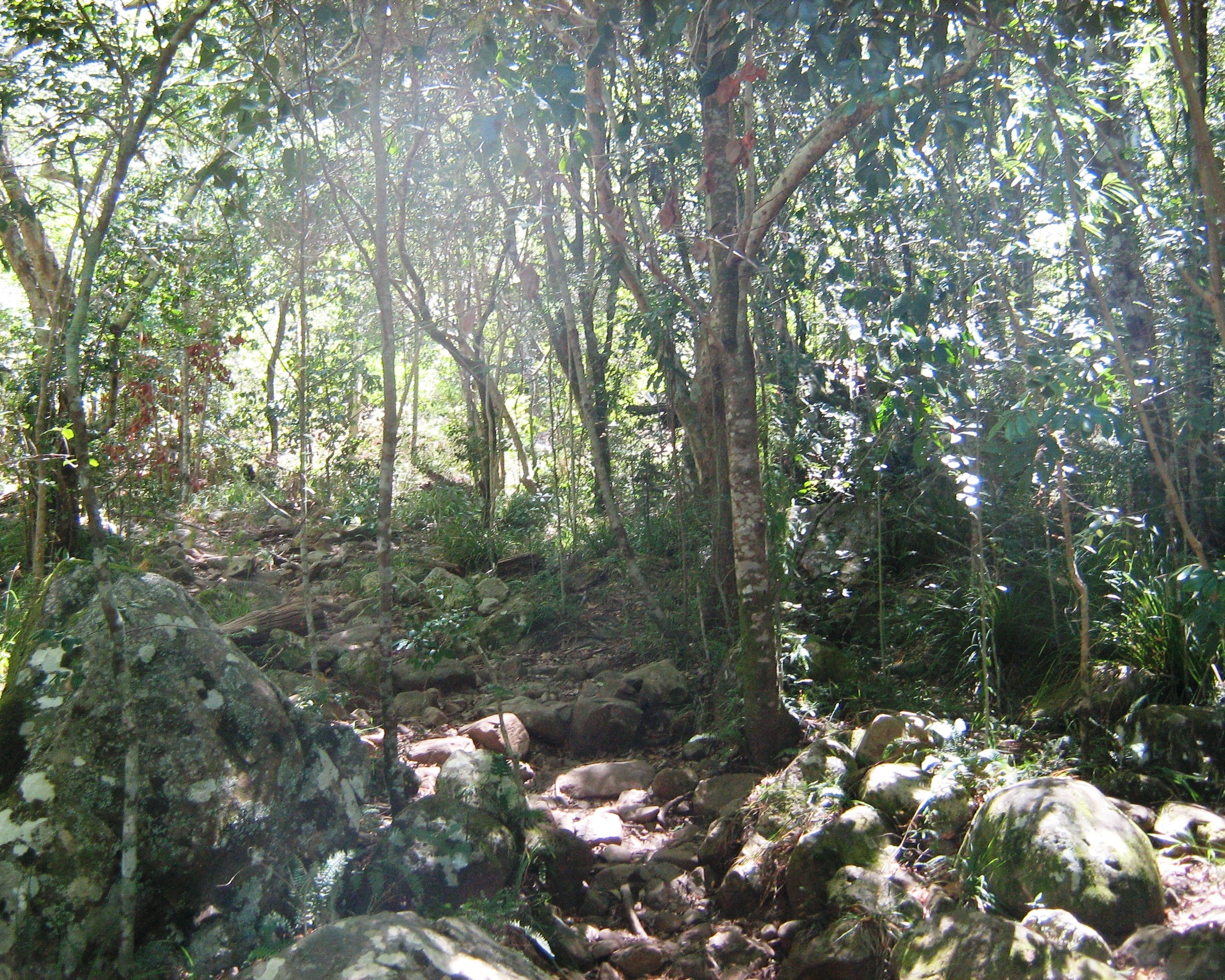
Newlands Forest, Cape Town

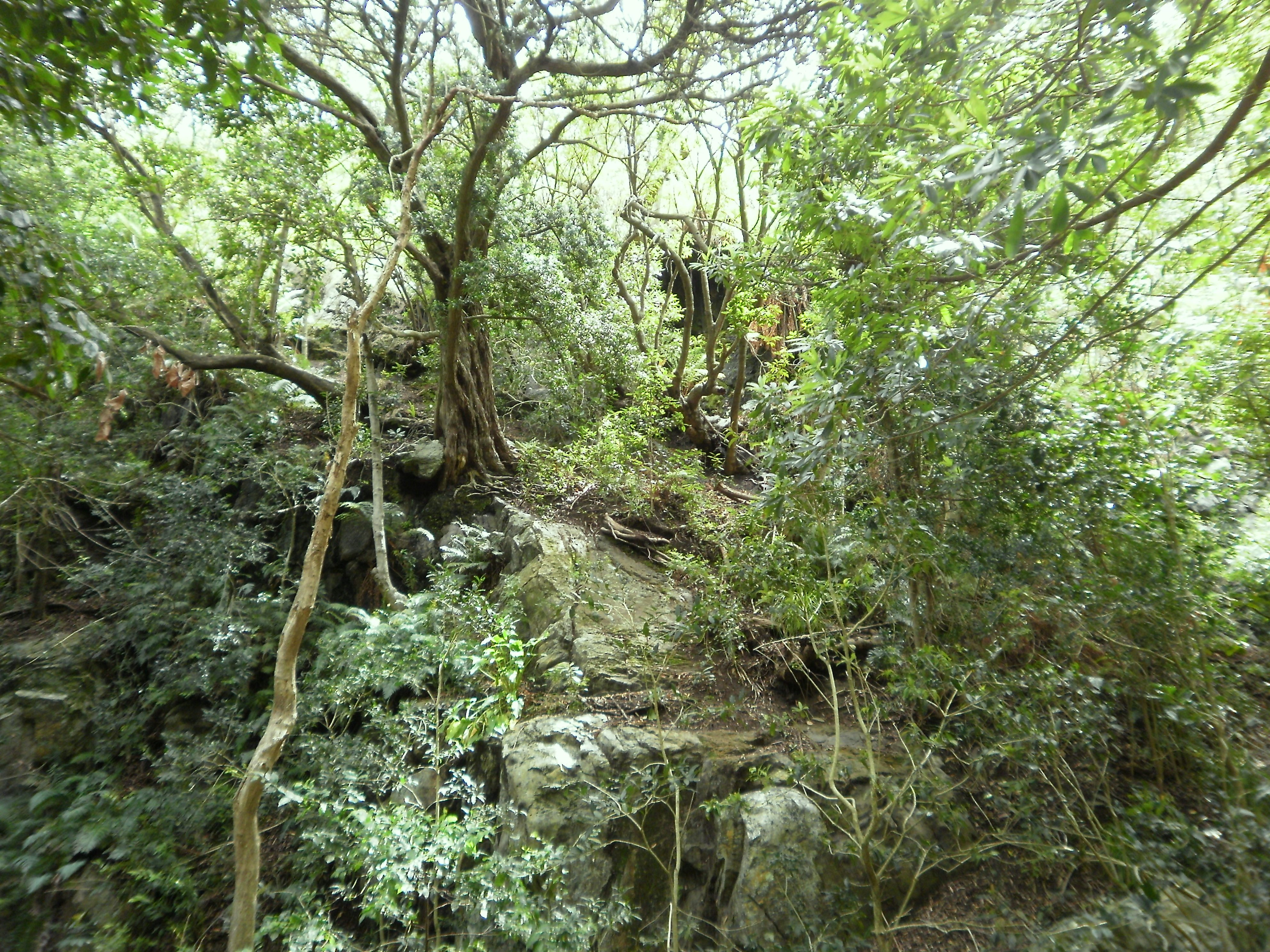

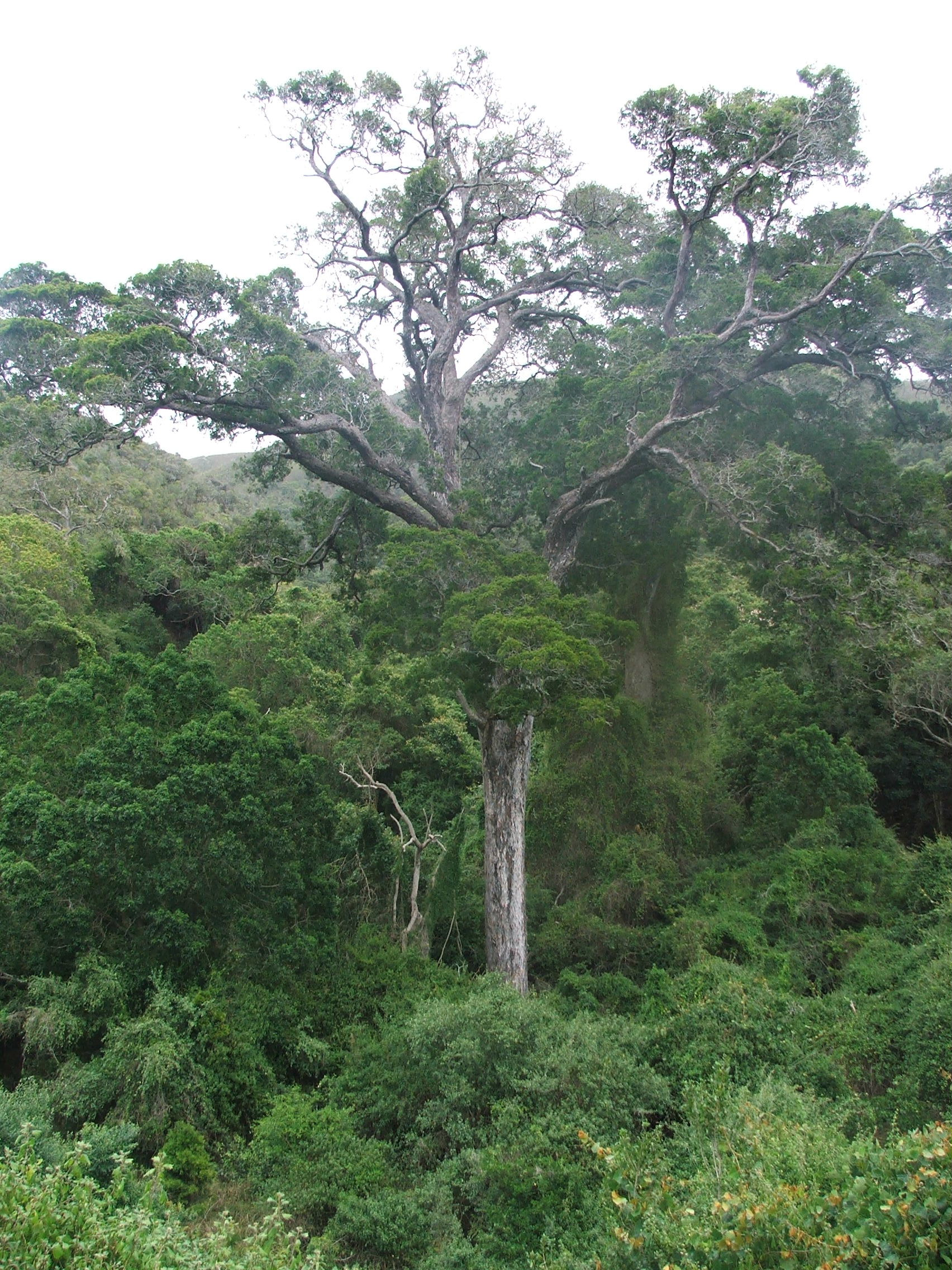
A giant yellowwood growing above the forest canopy near Knysna

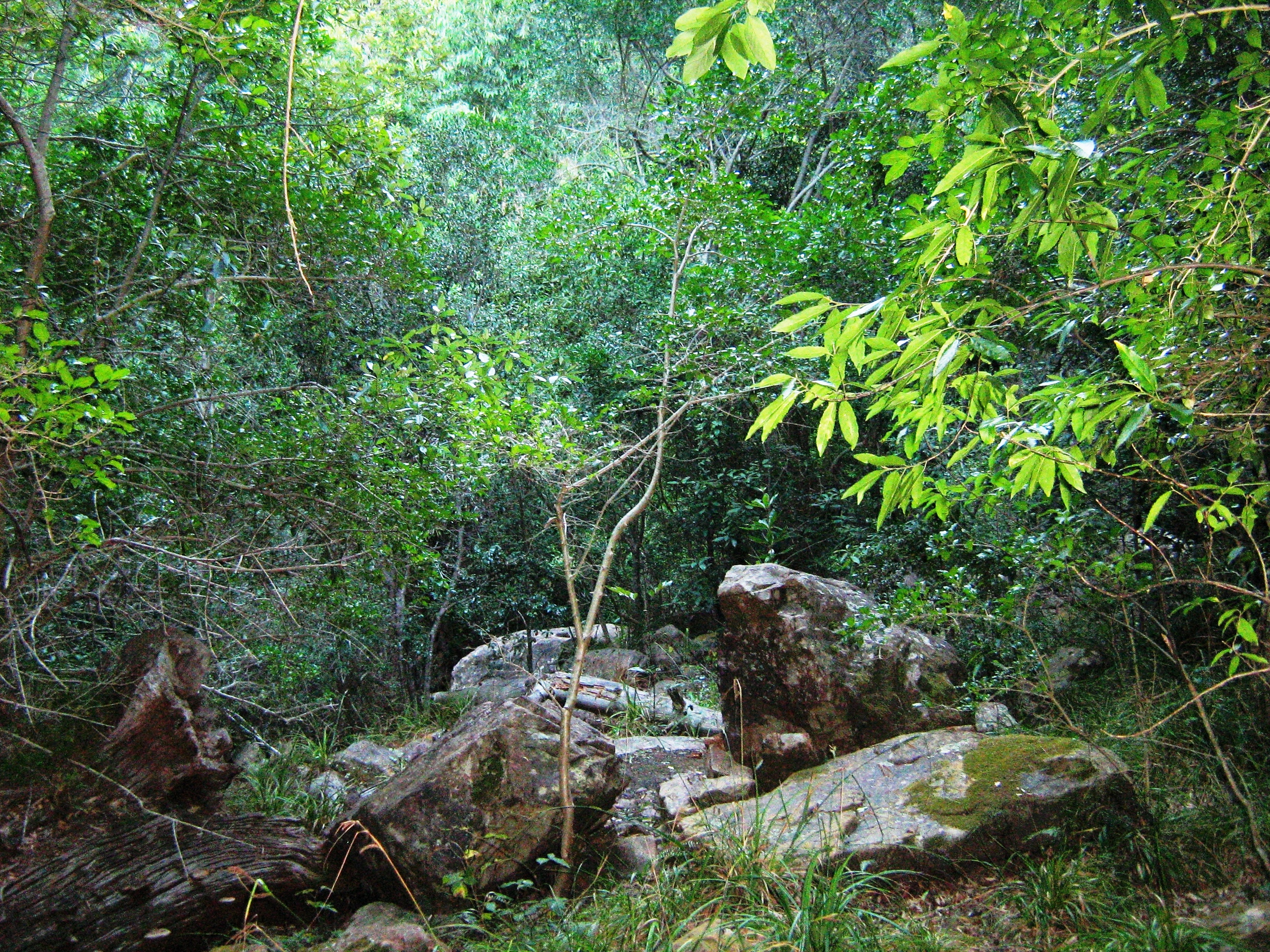

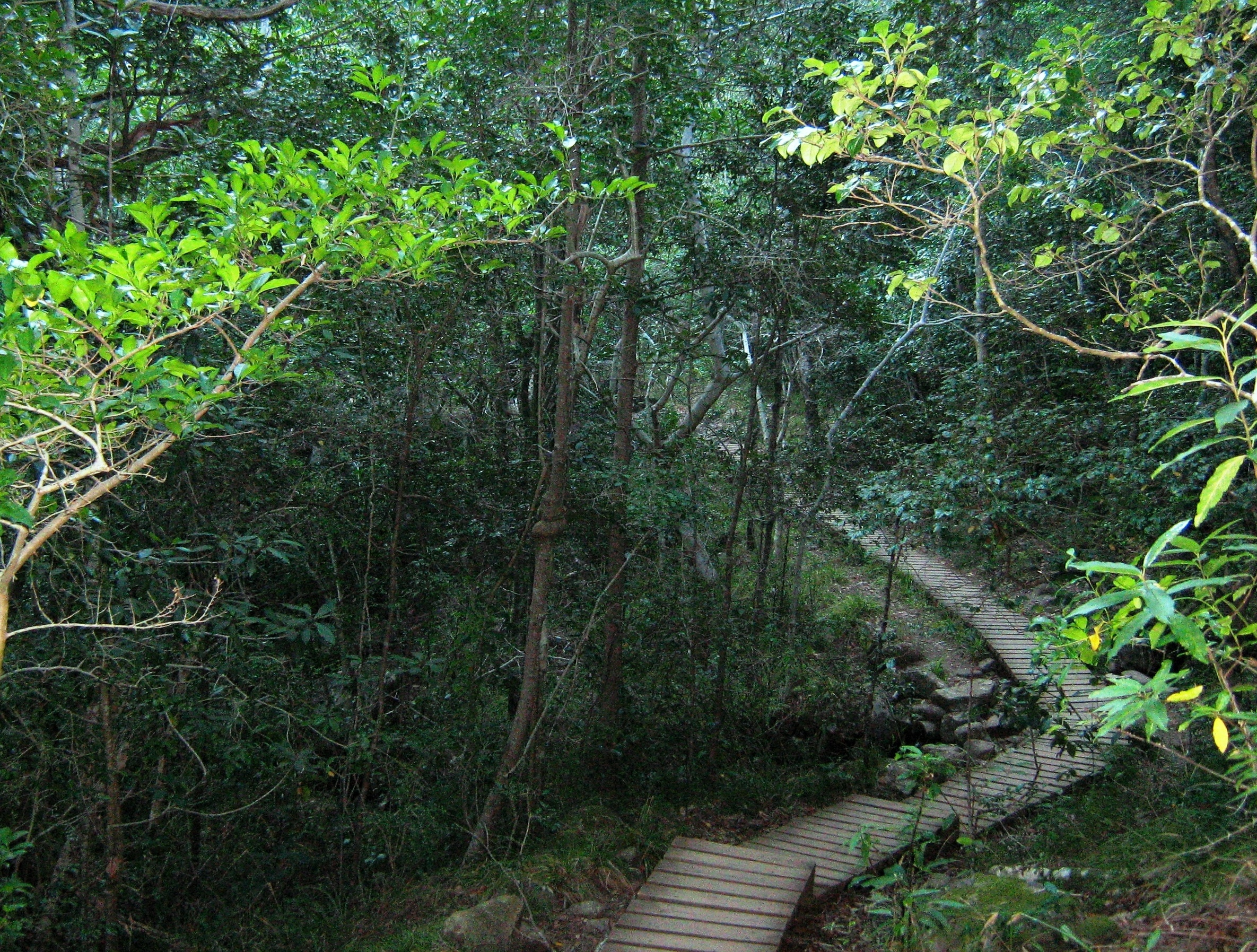
The "woodcutters path" through the indigenous forests in Newlands

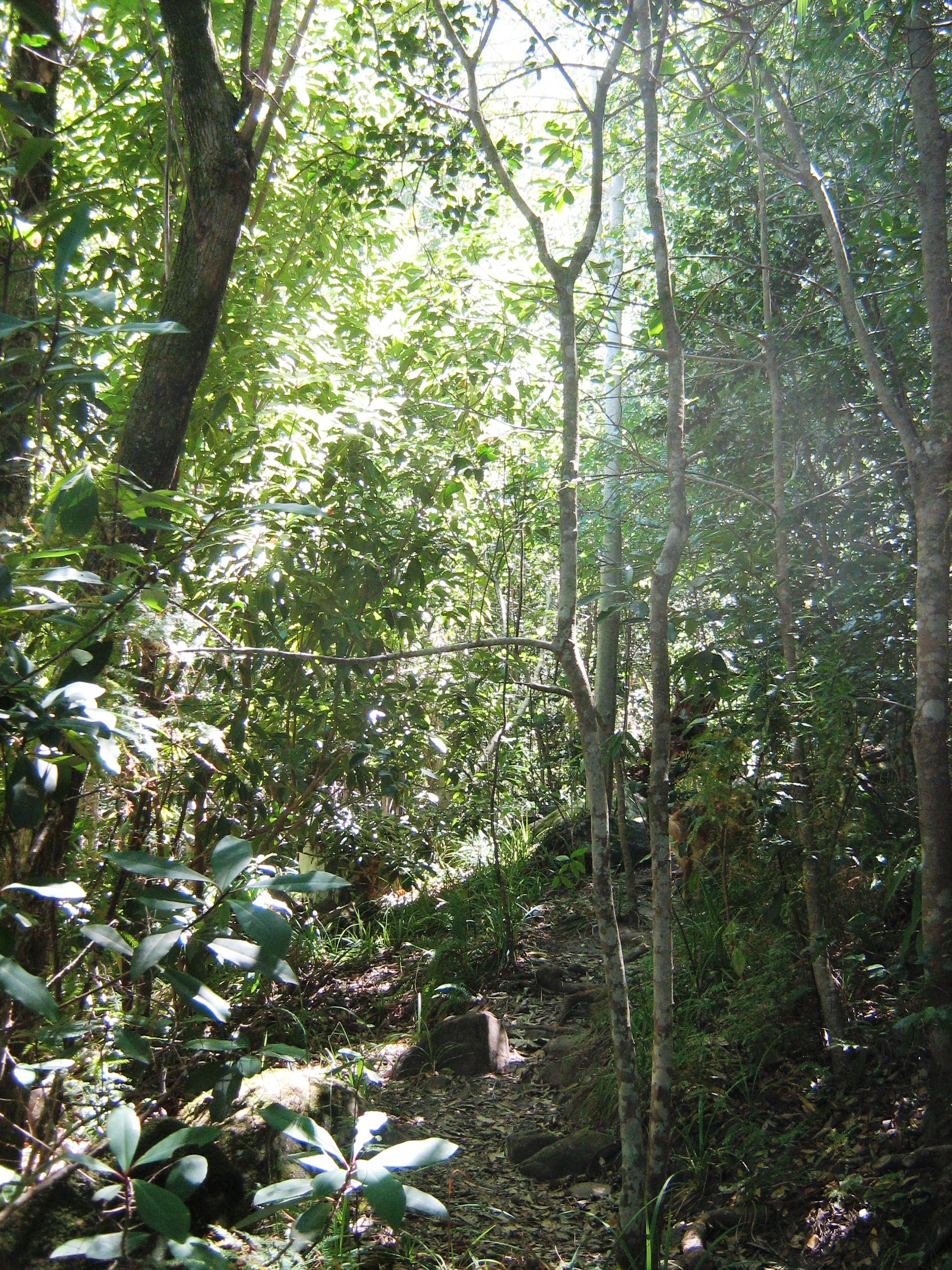
Rapanea species are common in Southern Afrotemperate Forest

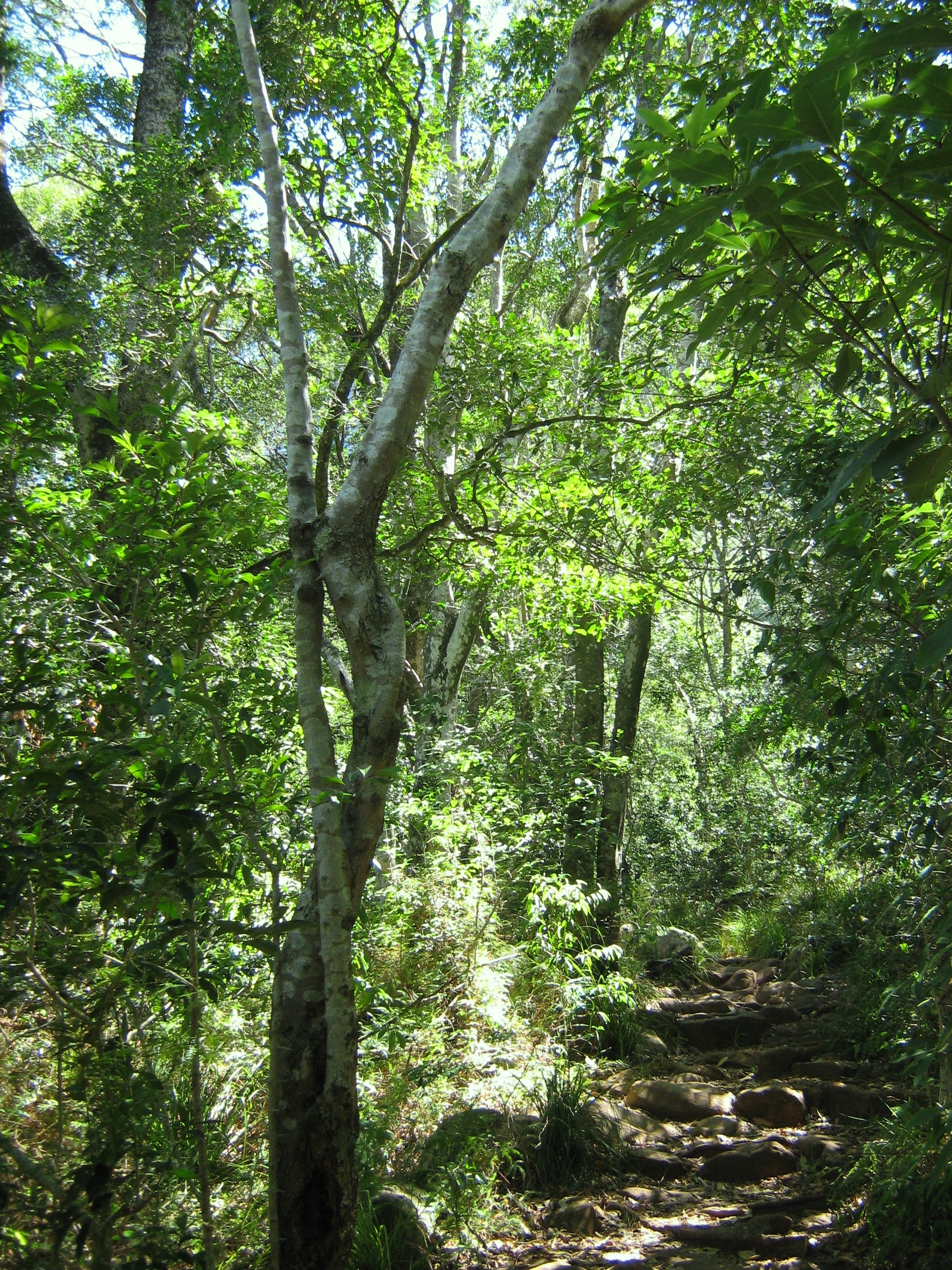

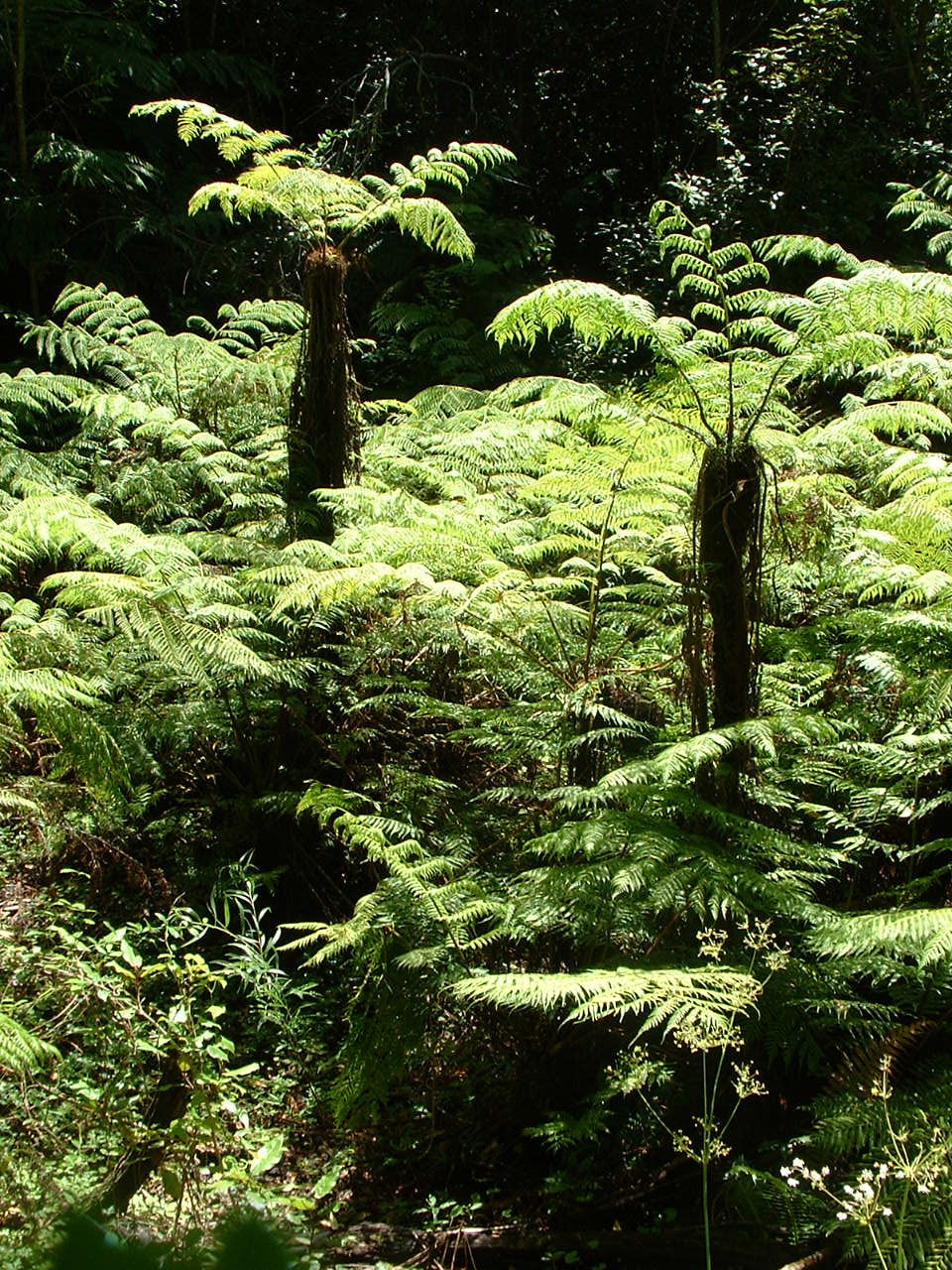
Tree ferns (Cyathea capensis) grow in wetter parts of the forest.

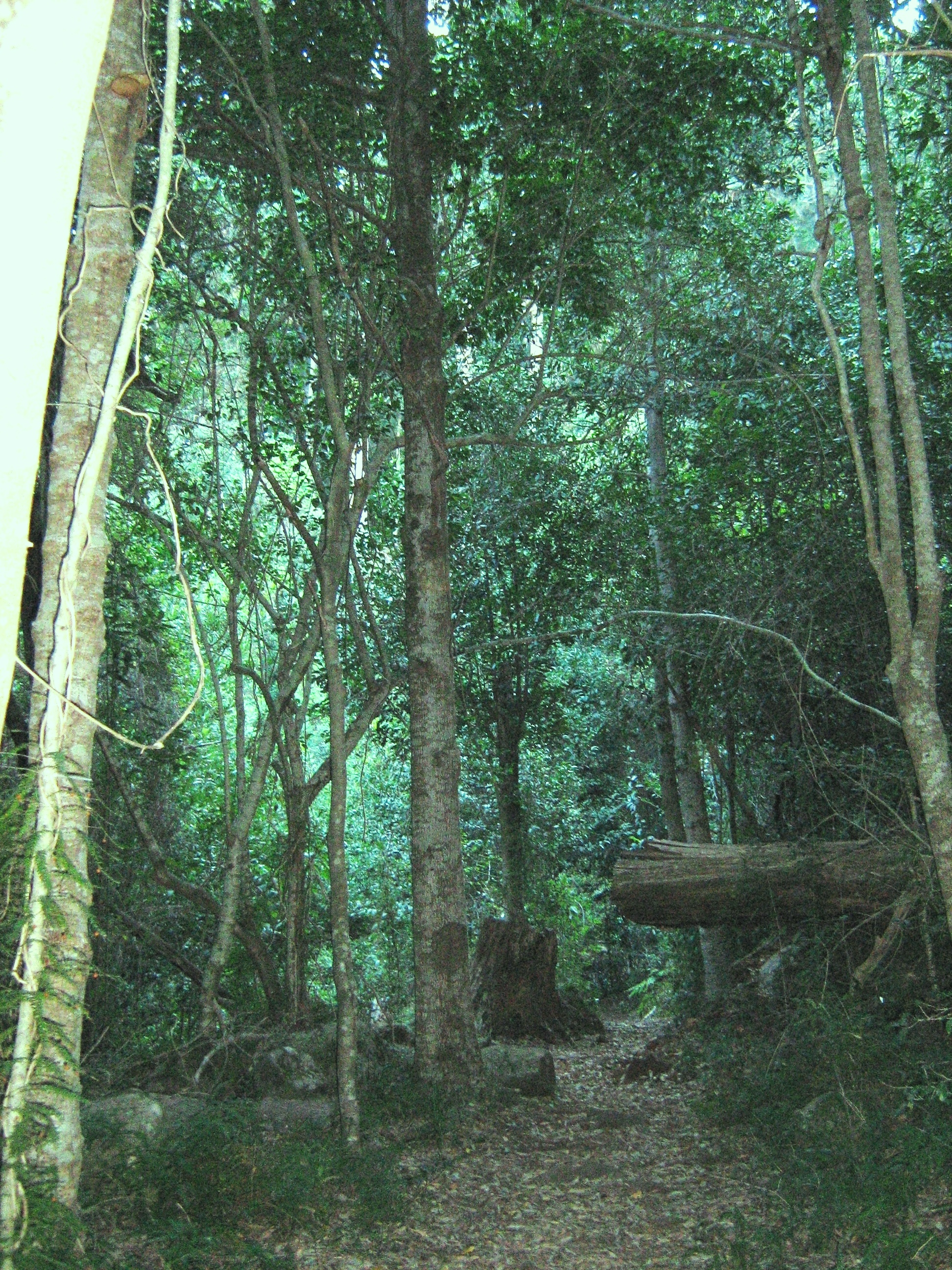
In more mature woodlands, the forest floor can be exceptionally shady.

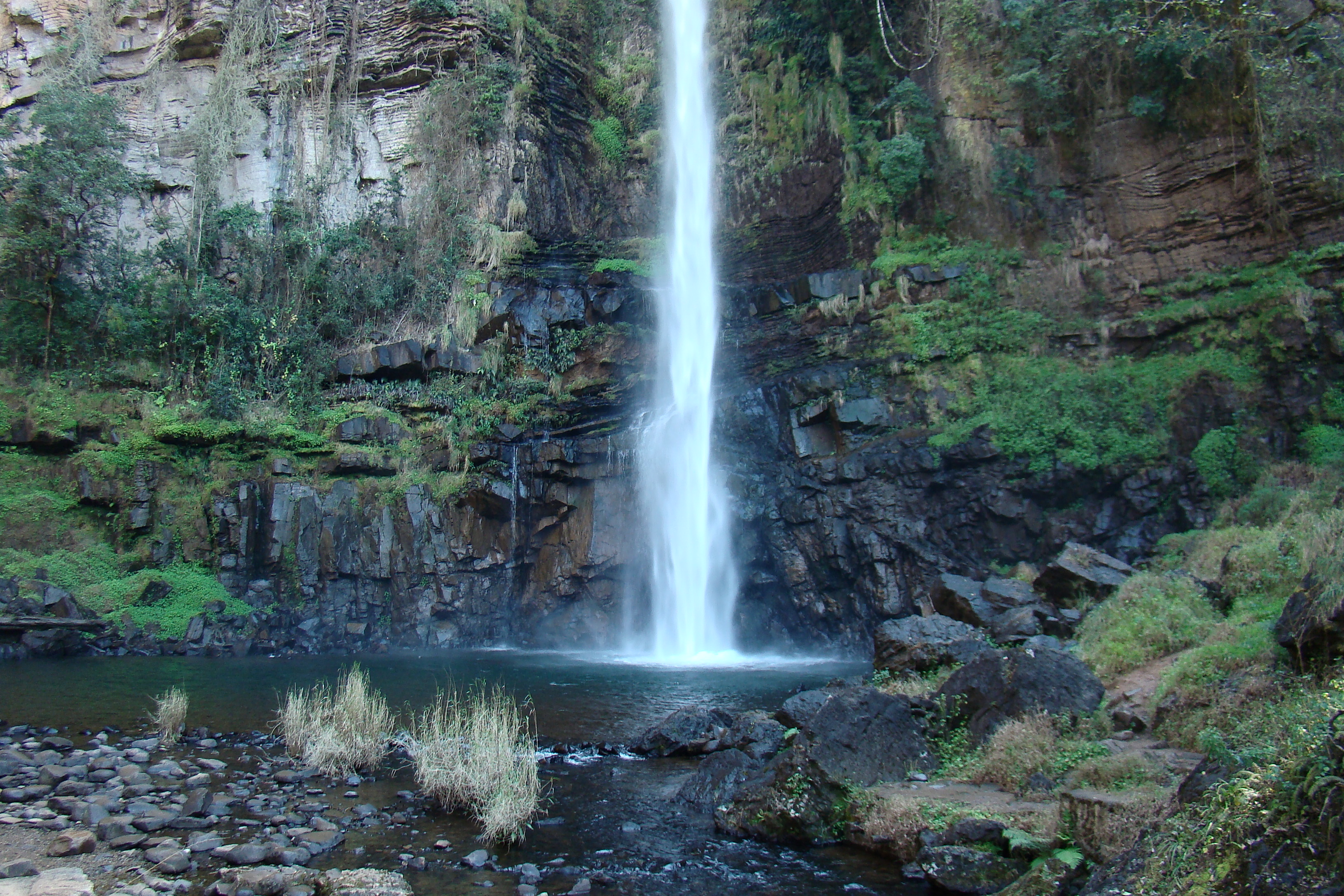

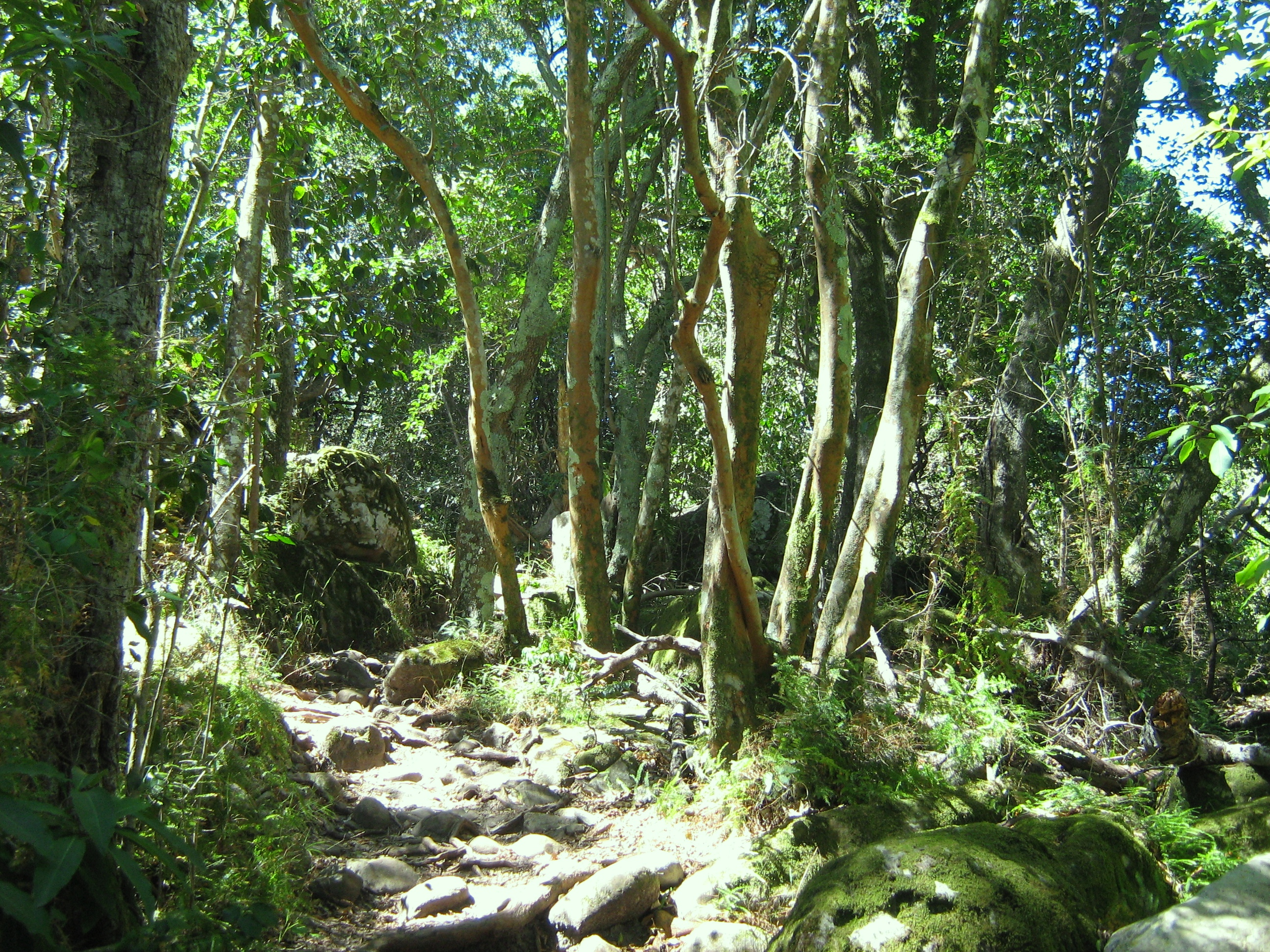

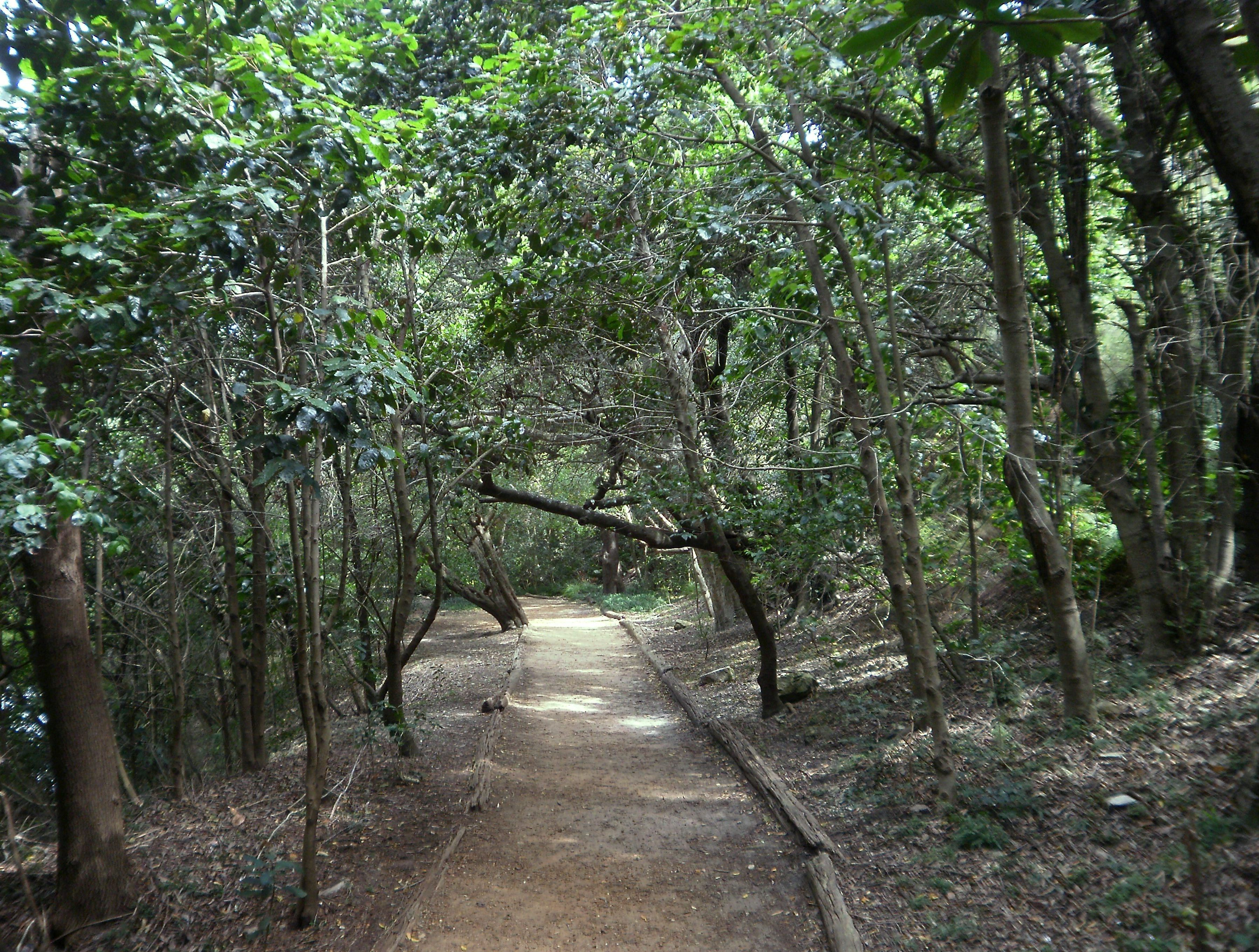
These forests are used recreationally for walking, among other things.

== See also ==
- Afromontane – Subregion of the Afrotropical realm
- Cape Floristic Region – Smallest of the six recognised floral kingdoms of the world
