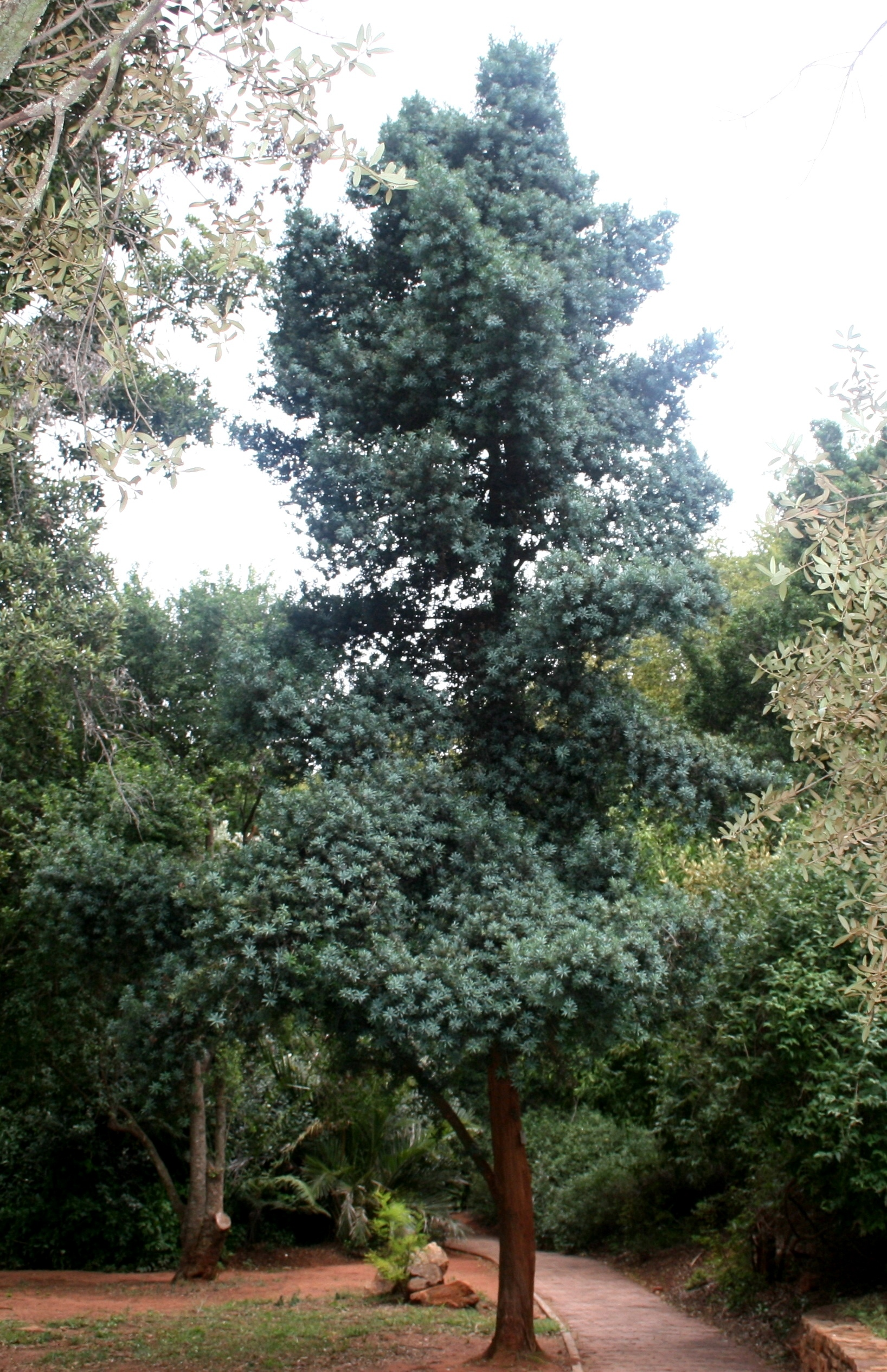
- Habit in the Pretoria National Botanical Garden

Conservation status
- Least Concern (IUCN 3.1)

Scientific classification
- Kingdom: Plantae
- Clade: Tracheophytes
- Clade: Gymnosperms
- Division: Pinophyta
- Class: Pinopsida
- Order: Araucariales
- Family: Podocarpaceae
- Genus: Podocarpus
- Species: P. elongatus

Binomial name
- Podocarpus elongatus (Aiton) L'Her. ex Pers.

Synonyms
- Nageia elongata (Aiton) F.Muell.; Podocarpus linearis Van Houtte ex Gordon & Glend., not validly publ.; Podocarpus pruinosus Eckl. & Zeyh. ex T.Durand & Schinz; Podocarpus thunbergii var. angustifolius Sim; Taxus capensis Lam.; Taxus elongata Aiton (1789)

= Podocarpus elongatus =

Breede River yellowwood

Species of tree

Podocarpus elongatus, the Breede River yellowwood, is a species of conifer in the family Podocarpaceae. In contrast to other yellowwood species of southern Africa, Podocarpus elongatus often resembles an enormous, round, multi-stemmed bush in its habit. The Breede River yellowwood is a protected tree in South Africa.

== Description ==
It can be distinguished from the other yellowwood species of Southern Africa by its relatively elongated, grey-blue leaves (hence its species name "elongatus"), and by its round, bushy shape. Note however, that Podocarpus henkelii was not described until after the name Podocarpus elongatus was established, and its leaves are decidedly longer, which might lead to some confusion. Podocarpus elongatus generally grows about as wide as it is tall, and its foliage reaches very low, roughly resembling a hut in habit.

== Range and habit ==
In South Africa it is restricted to the Breede River valley in the Western Cape and its range extends as far north as the Cedarberg mountains. It typically grows along rivers and on rocky outcrops in fynbos vegetation. This is the only South African yellowwood species that coppices when the trunk is damaged. It is a riverine species, and its ability to coppice is important to its survival in the event of its being levelled by floods or bushfires.

It is also native to Malawi, Zambia, and Zimbabwe.

As a garden tree it is sometimes grown as an ornamental feature and its fruit attracts birds. Climatically it is hardier than other yellowwood species in surrounding regions.

== Gallery ==
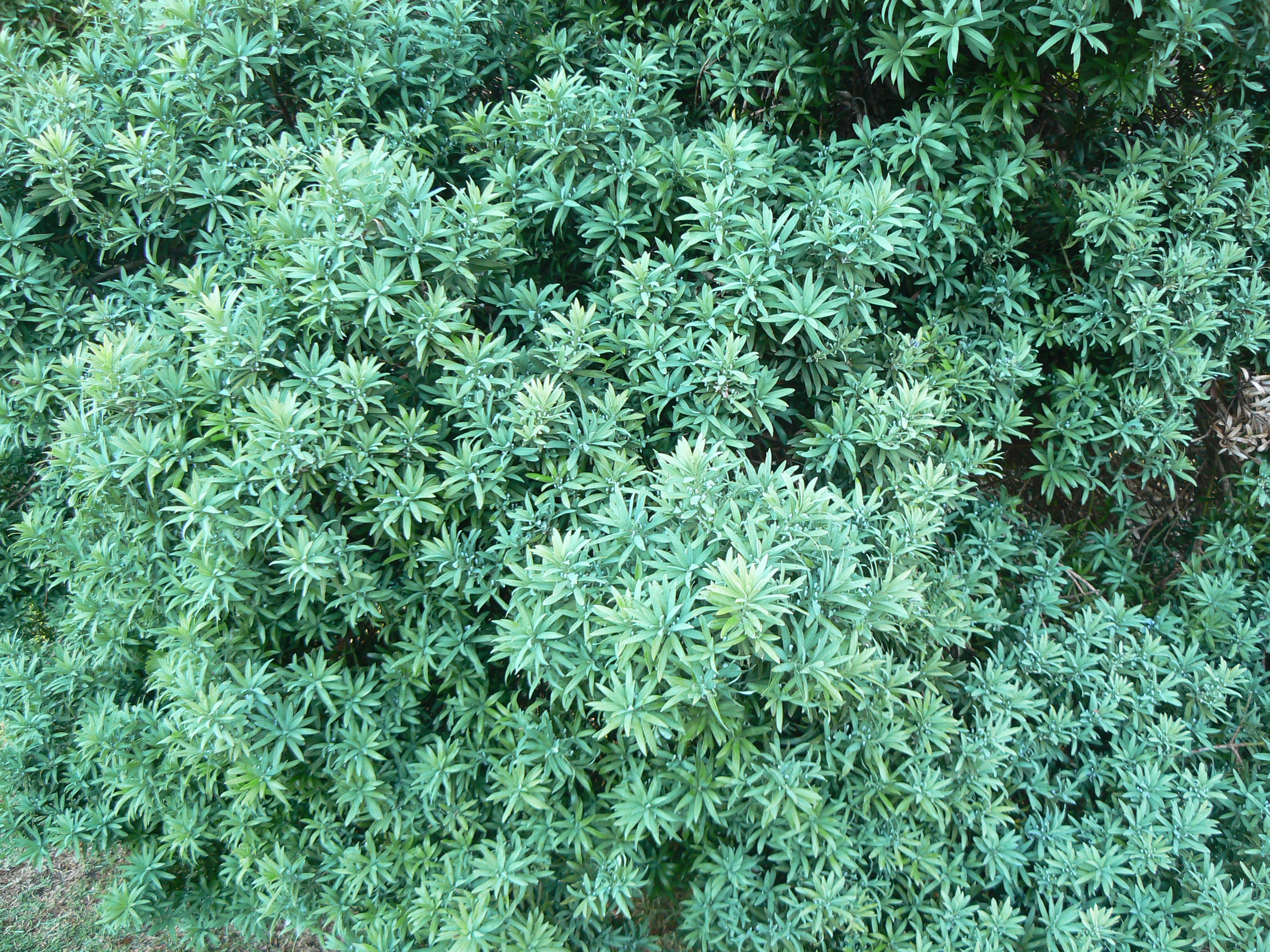
Foliage

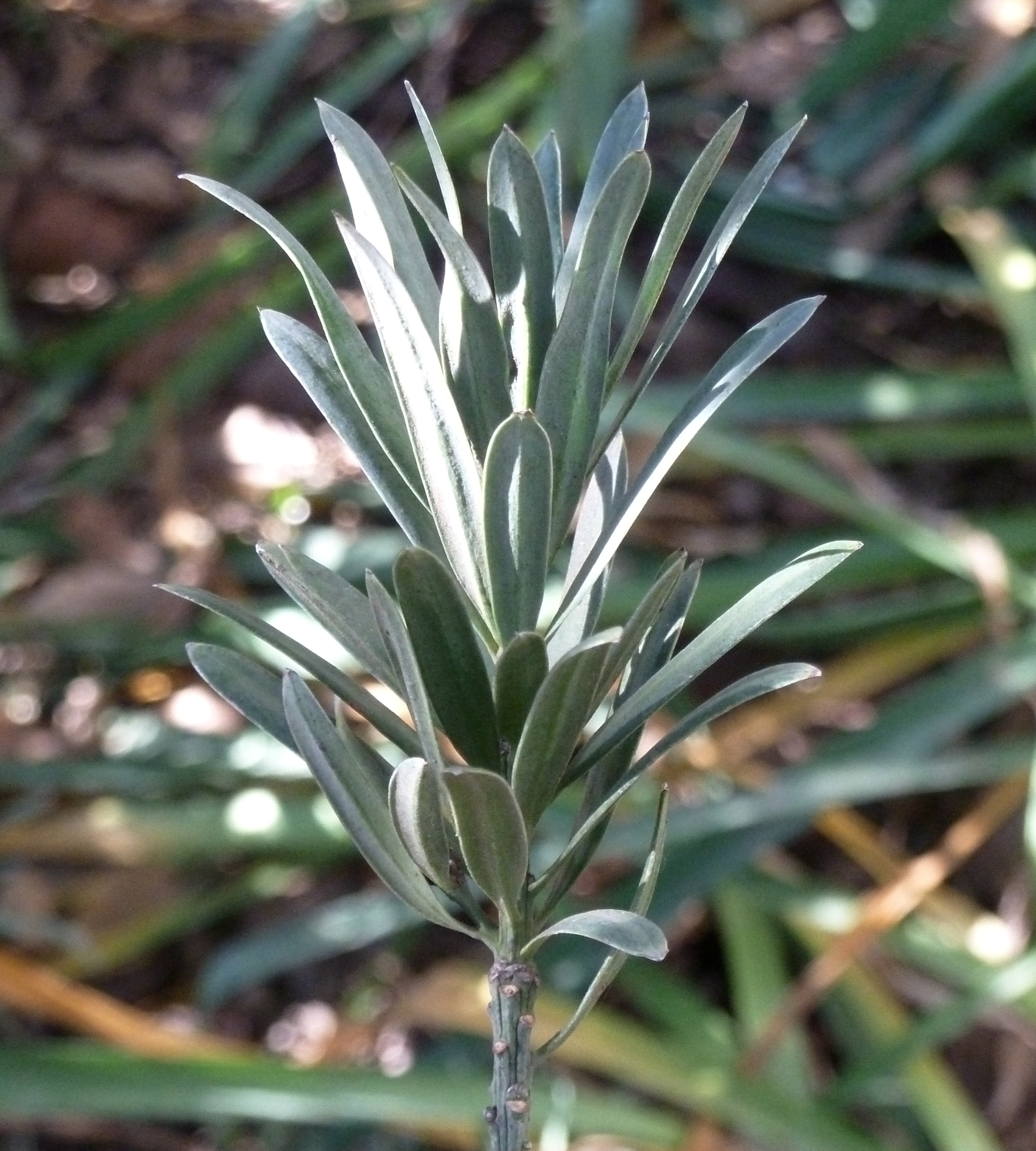
Foliage close-up

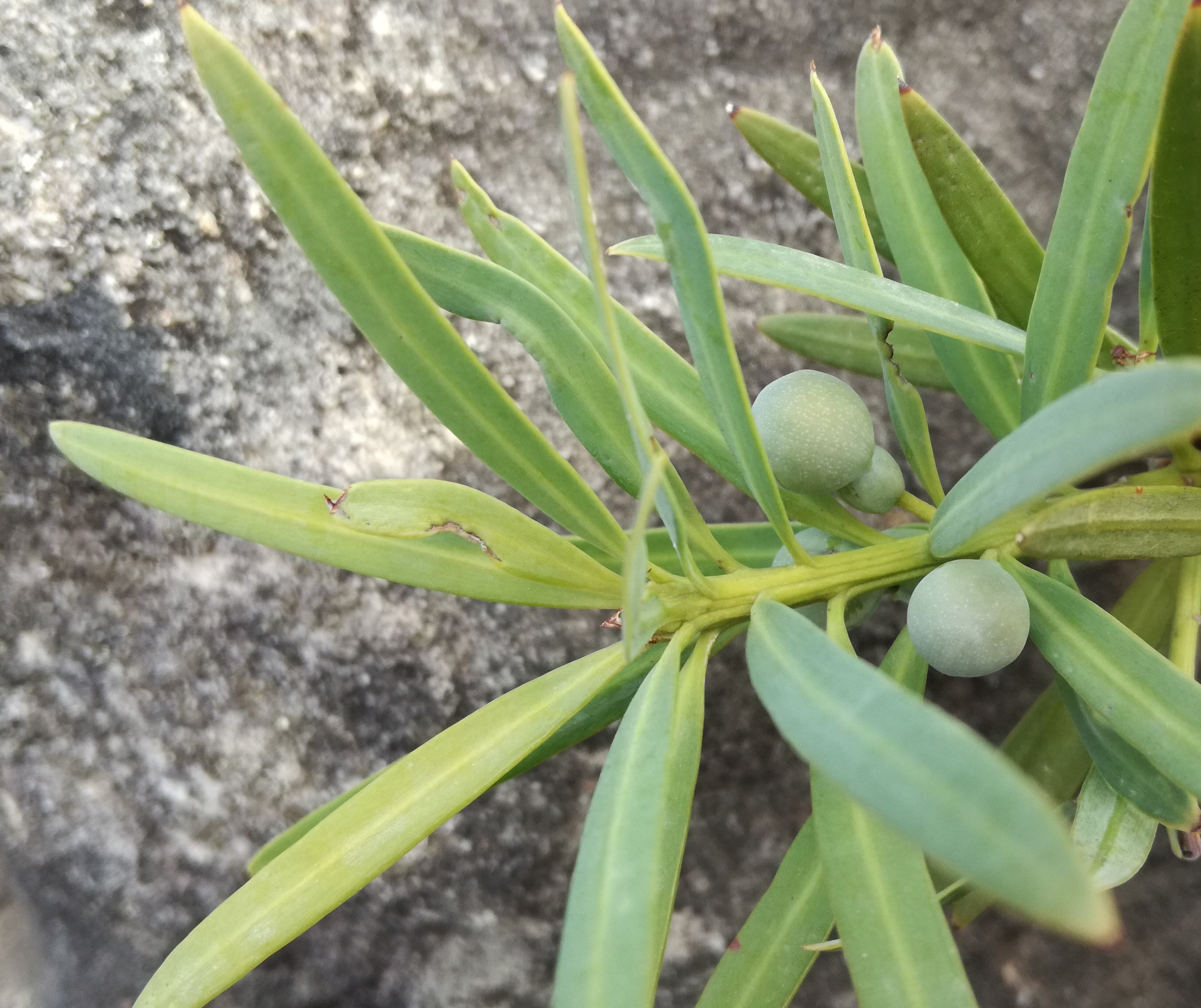
Foliage with fruit

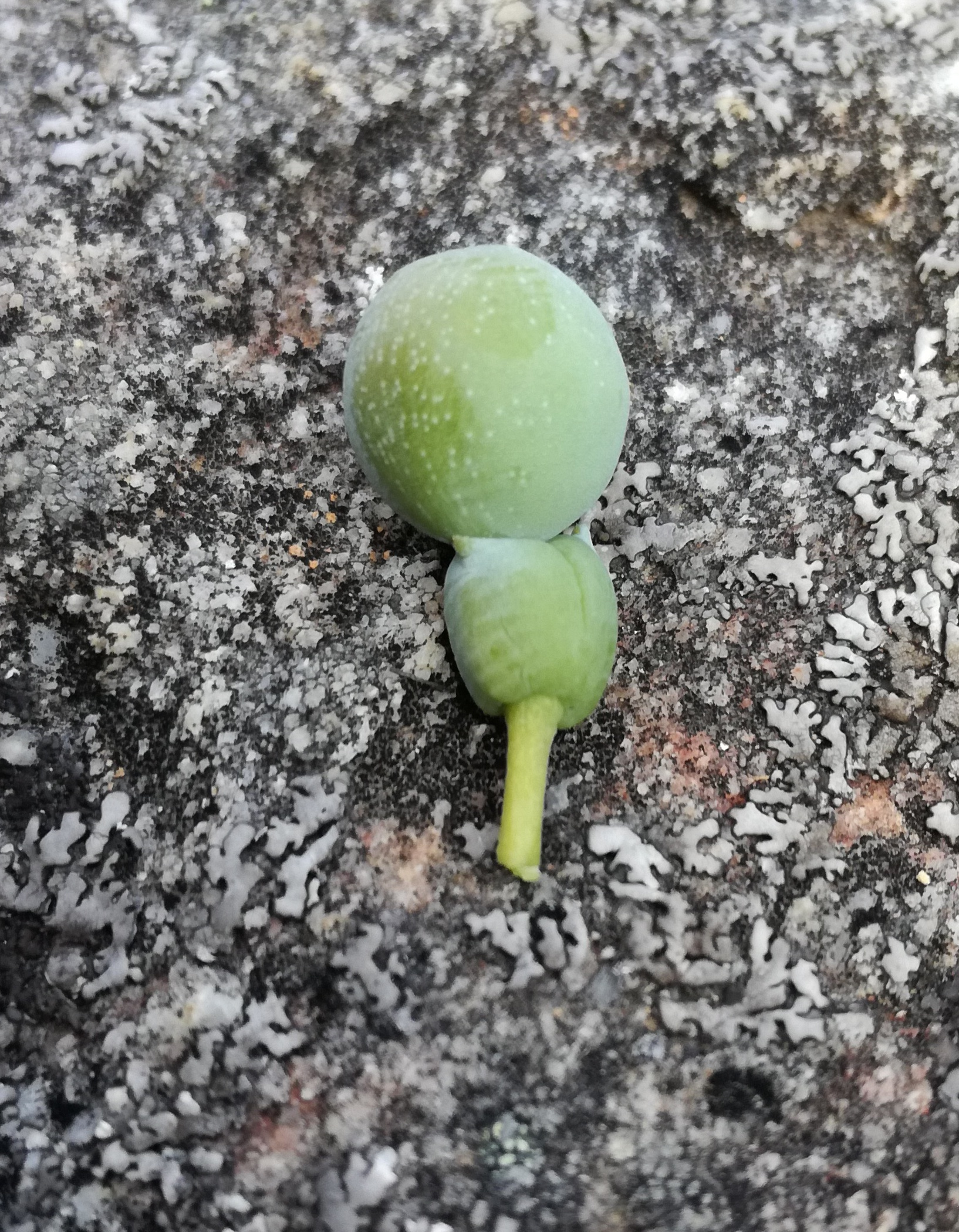
Fruit with receptacle

== See also ==
- List of Southern African indigenous trees
