= Metrosideros angustifolia =

Conservation status
- Least Concern (IUCN 3.1)

Scientific classification
- Kingdom: Plantae
- Clade: Tracheophytes
- Clade: Angiosperms
- Clade: Eudicots
- Clade: Rosids
- Order: Myrtales
- Family: Myrtaceae
- Genus: Metrosideros
- Species: M. angustifolia

Binomial name
- Metrosideros angustifolia (L.) Sm.

Synonyms
- Myrtus angustifolia L.; Nania angustifolia (L.) Kuntze

Species of tree

Metrosideros angustifolia, the Cape-gum, is a species of small tree restricted to fynbos and resembles the waterbessie. It is endemic to the Western Cape. It lives on stream banks where it occurs as a small tree, large specimens are rare. The tree can be identified by its narrow, elliptical, hairless leaves. There are usually some red leaves present on the tree.
