= Peninsula Granite Fynbos =

Vegetation type endemic to the city of Cape Town, South Africa

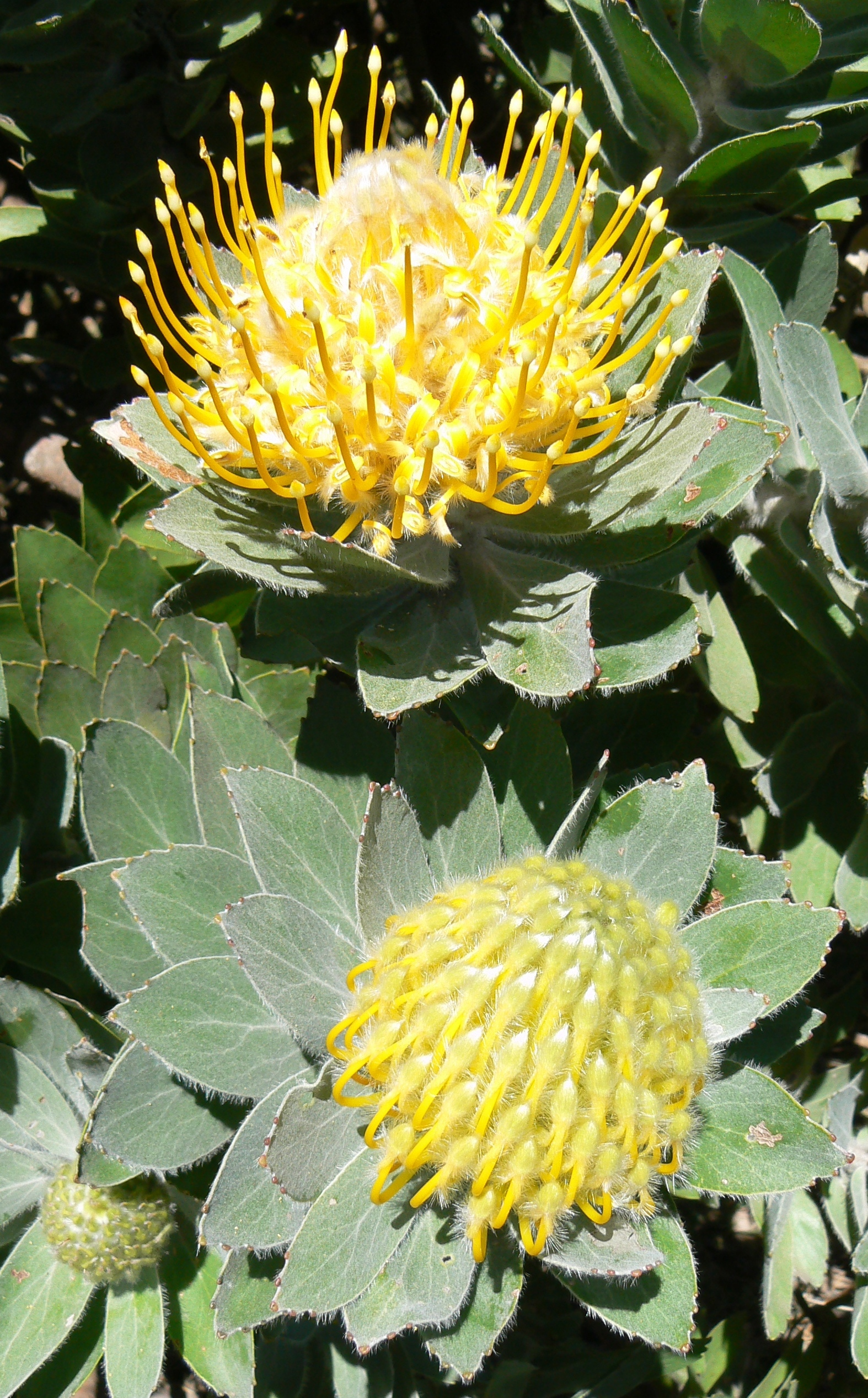
The Grey Tree Pincushion Protea, a Cape Town endemic, is mainly restricted to Peninsula Granite Fynbos

Peninsula Granite Fynbos is an endangered Fynbos vegetation type which is endemic to the city of Cape Town and occurs nowhere else. It is a unique type of tall, dense and diverse scrubland, scattered with trees. It can be found all along the belt of granite that encircles Table Mountain.

== Natural Distribution ==
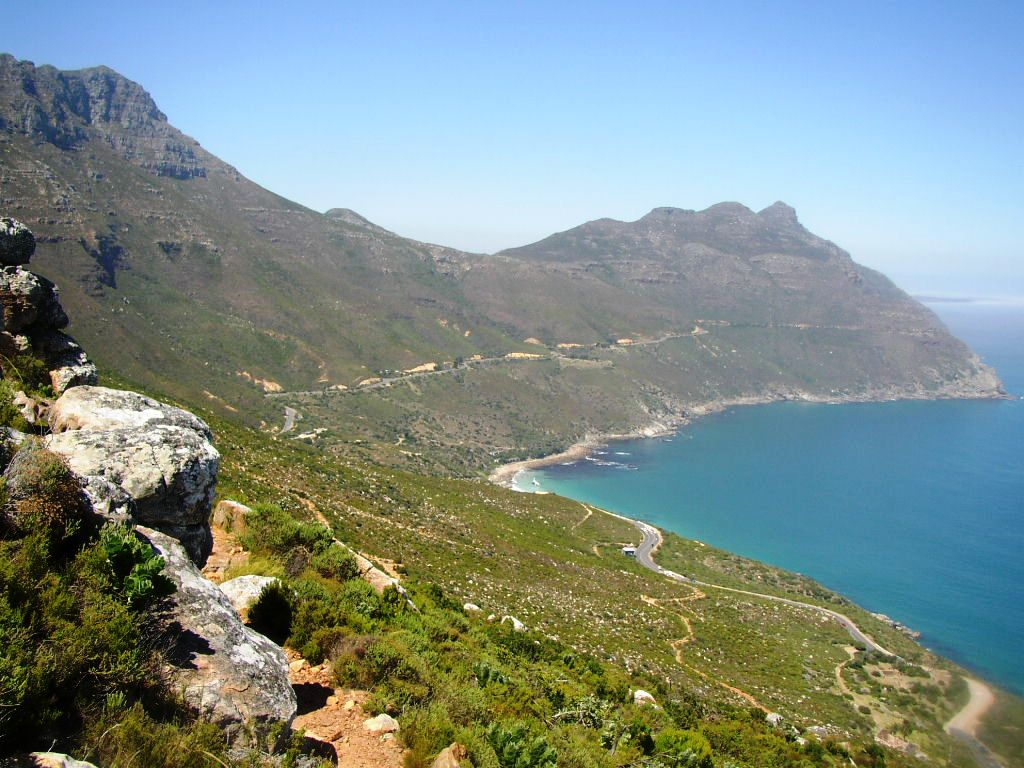
Peninsula Granite Fynbos near Chapmans Peak, Cape Town

This unique vegetation type occurs only within the city of Cape Town, particularly in a band that encircles the Table Mountain range – following the stratum of the Cape Granite Suite. It occurs from Lion's Head in the north, to Hout Bay and Muizenberg in the south. There is also an isolated patch near Simonstown, further to the south. It grows on the gentler, lower slopes of Table Mountain, over rolling hills and valleys - in rich, deep soils formed from eroded granite. Because of the rich soils and gentle terrain, most of this ecosystem has been destroyed to make way for vineyards, wealthy suburbs and commercial pine plantations. In fact, the largest patches of exposed granite soils are at Newlands, Wynberg Hill and Constantia, and these are all areas that have been developed for housing, farmed, or planted with invasive pine trees.

== Description ==
Peninsula Granite Fynbos is dominated by Asteraceous (daisy) and Proteoid (protea) species, although Erica and restio species become more dominant in wetter patches. There are two distinct subtypes of this vegetation: the especially endangered South Peninsula Granite Fynbos which grows on the more lush southern and eastern slopes, and North Peninsula Granite Fynbos which dominates the drier northern and western slopes.

A striking feature of this vegetation is the presence of massive, tree-like Proteas such as the groves of Waboom trees (Protea nitida) which grow in the northern section, the famous Silvertrees (Leucadendron argenteum) which dominate the wetter southern and eastern slopes, and the endemic Grey Tree Pincushion Protea (Leucospermum conocarpodendron) which covers the drier western slopes. Tall, dense, indigenous Afromontane Forest (a very different vegetation type) takes over from fynbos in any areas that are protected from seasonal fires, especially in river valleys and wetter areas. Peninsula Granite Fynbos used to support a great many wild animals but the larger game is now mostly locally extinct.

== Threats and Vulnerable Species ==
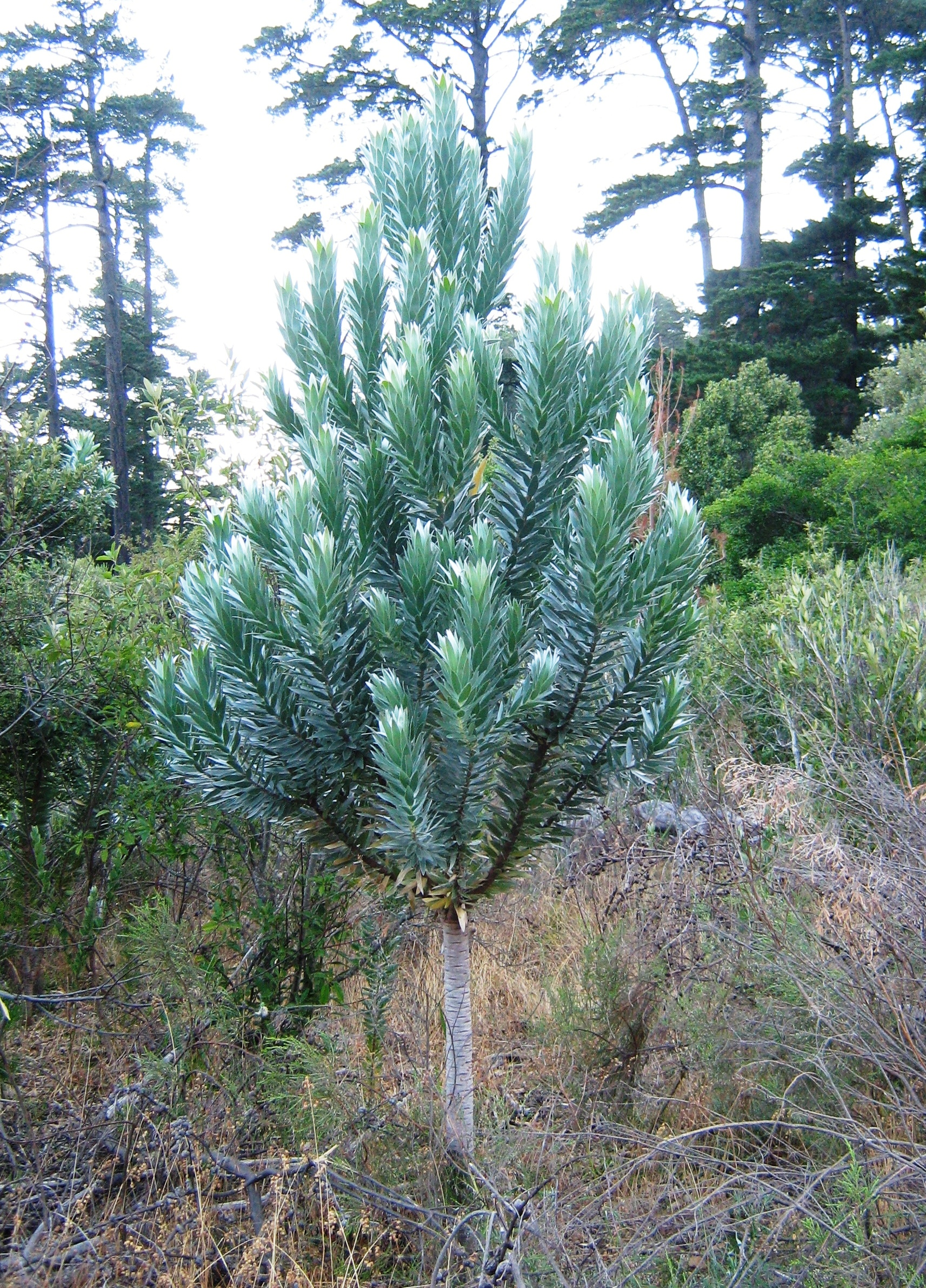
A young Silver tree growing at Newlands Forest, after the partial removal of the invasive Pine plantations

Today the major threat to this endangered ecosystem is definitely from invasive alien plants. The two main invaders are Wattles (especially Blackwood, but also Black Wattle and Stinkbean) and Pines. In fact, much of the remnants of this endangered vegetation type are still beneath large commercial pine plantations. However, apart from the main two, there are a great many other invasive plant species – both trees and smaller plants. This is actually one of the most severely invaded of all vegetation types in South Africa.
Another threat is the prevention of the seasonal fires that naturally sweep the area every few years, replenishing and revitalising the vegetation. Without the fires, the fynbos plants grow old and die, and their seeds cannot germinate. The areas of dense Afrotemperate forest then expand and replace the fynbos.

Some of the plants that are endemic to this vegetation type and occur nowhere else are:

- Leucadendron grandiflorum (The Wynberg Conebush, a tall protea that is now extinct)
- Hermannia micrantha (Small-flowered Dolls Rose, a flowering shrub)
- Gnidia parvula (Small-flowered Saffron Bush, a low shrub)
- Cliffortia carinata (Crown Climbers Friend)
- Polycarena silenoides (Granite Cape Flax, a small herb)
- Erepsia patula (The Spreading Ever-fig, a succulent shrub)
- Lampranthus curvifolius (Bakoven Brightfig, succulent)
- Aristea pauciflora (The Unistem Aristea, a geophytic herb)
- Willdenowia affinis (The Table Mountain Window Reed, a graminoid)

A related vegetation type is Boland Granite Fynbos, a vulnerable fynbos type that occurs to the east.

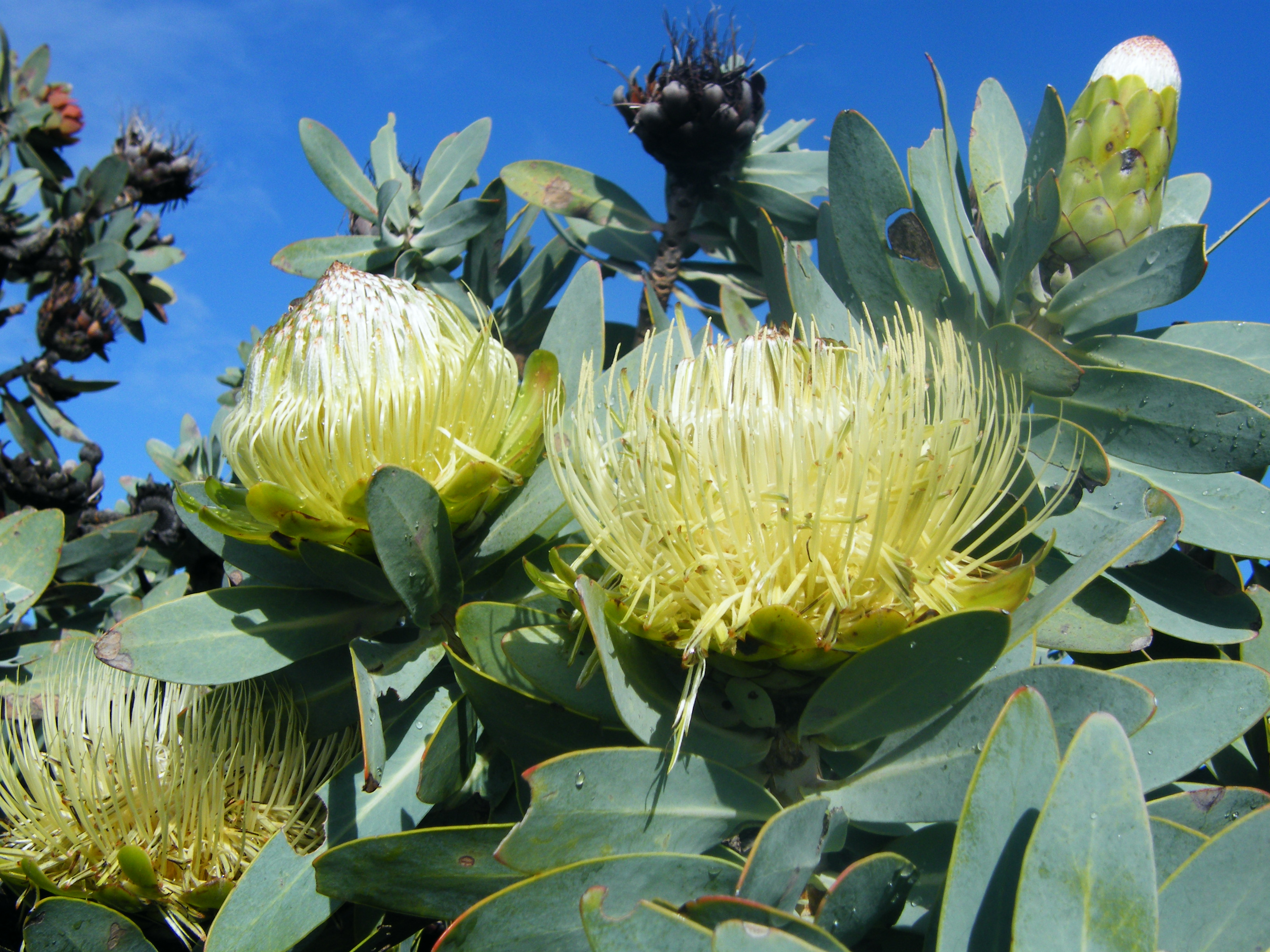
The large Wagon-tree Protea grows in the northern stretches of Peninsula Granite Fynbos.

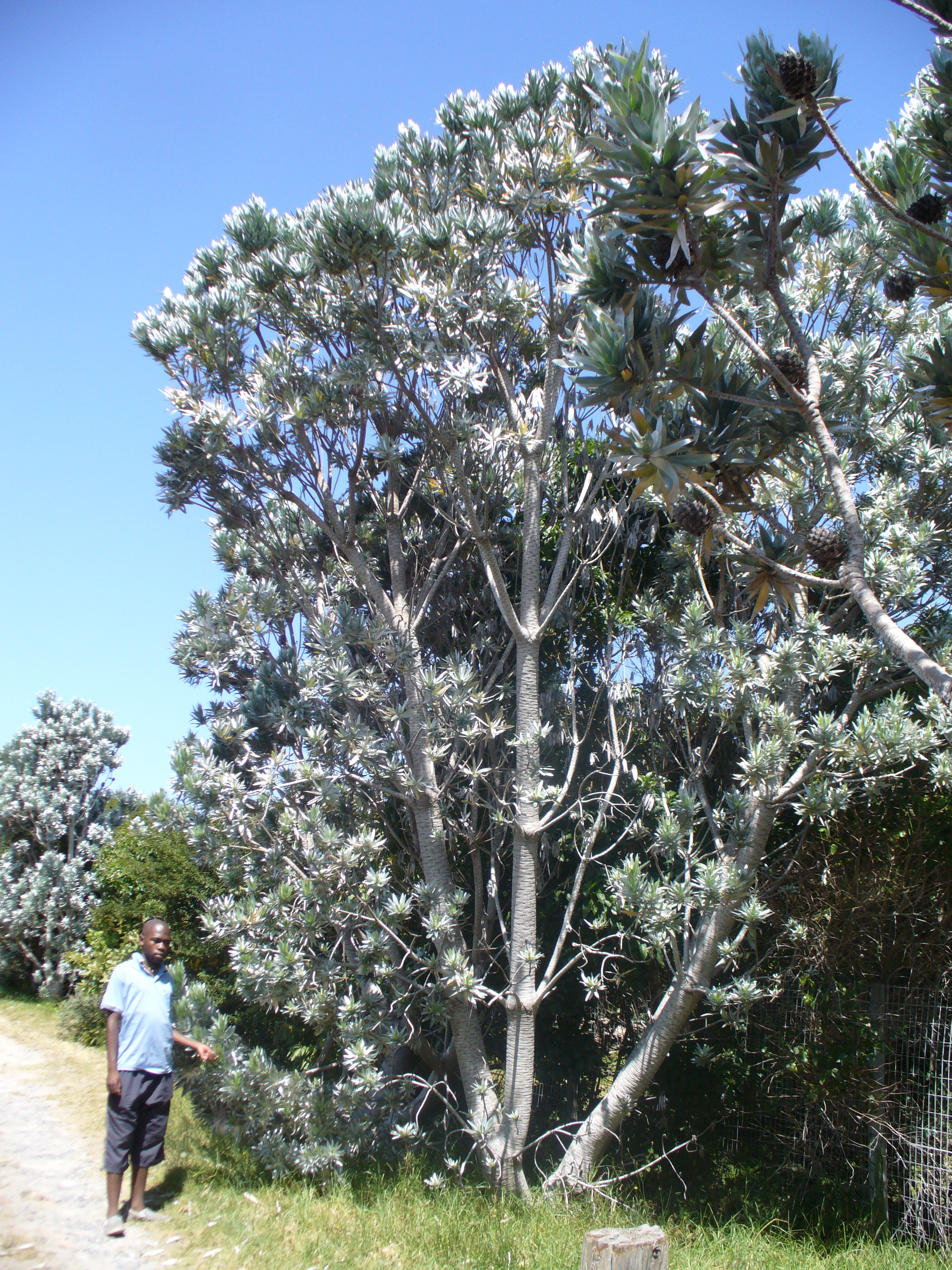
The even larger Silver tree protea grows in the wetter southern areas.

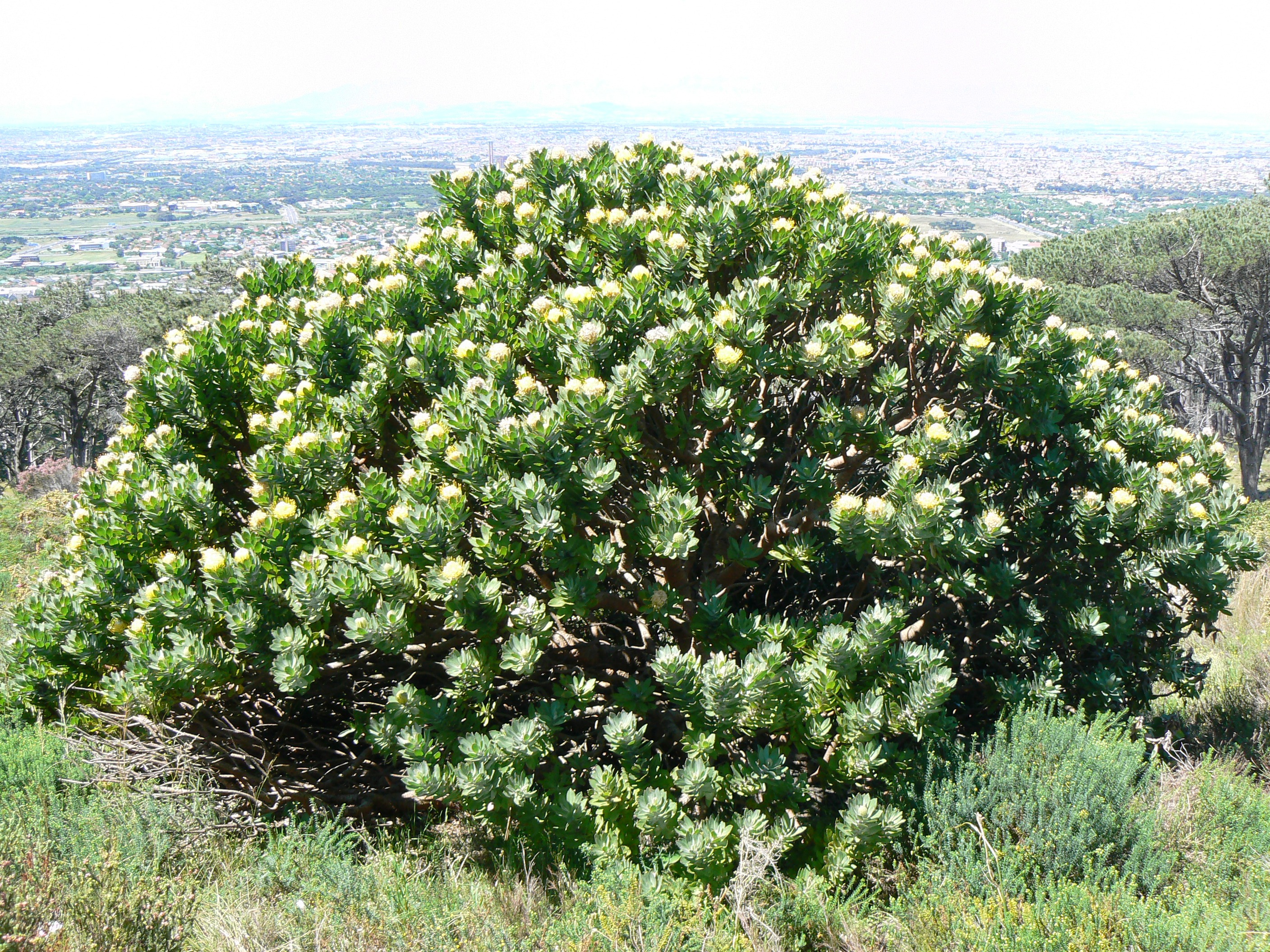
The Grey Tree Pincushion Protea which is confined to only a few northern slopes of Peninsula Granite Fynbos.

== See also ==
- Biodiversity of Cape Town
- Cecilia Park
- Newlands Forest
- Peninsula Sandstone Fynbos
- Table Mountain
- Category:Fynbos
