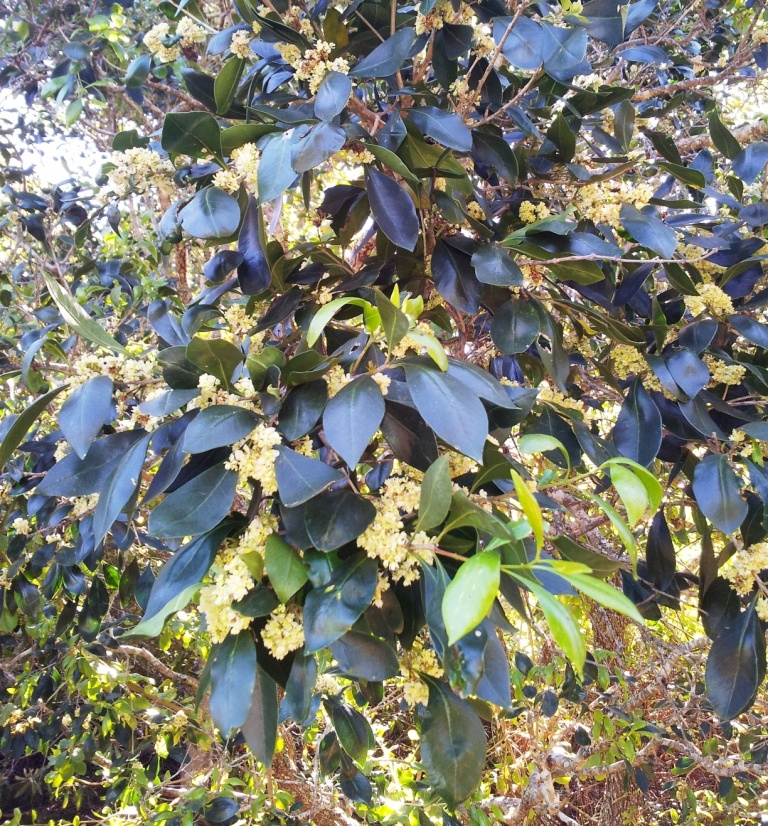

Scientific classification
- Kingdom: Plantae
- Clade: Tracheophytes
- Clade: Angiosperms
- Clade: Eudicots
- Clade: Rosids
- Order: Myrtales
- Family: Penaeaceae
- Genus: Olinia
- Species: O. ventosa

Binomial name
- Olinia ventosa (L.) Cufod.

= Olinia ventosa =

Species of tree

Olinia ventosa, commonly known as the hard-pear. is a large, evergreen forest tree indigenous to South Africa.

== Appearance ==
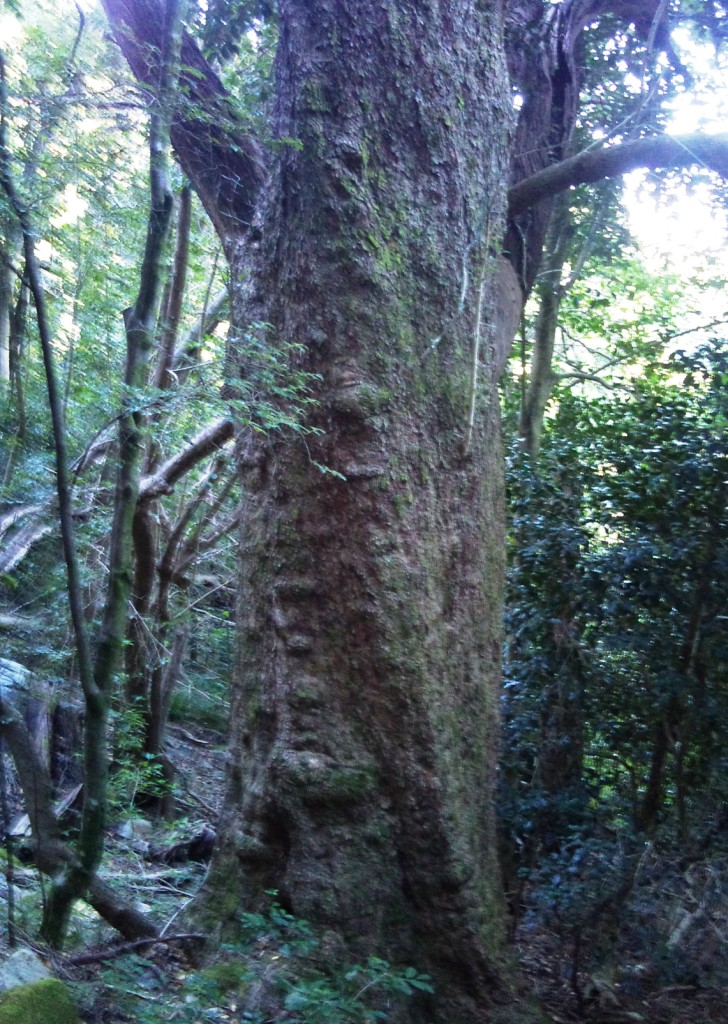
Trunk of a large Olinia ventosa tree, growing in an indigenous forest on Table Mountain.

The hard-pear is a large tree that usually grows to 15–20 meters in height. When exposed to harsh conditions, it forms a smaller tree or shrub.

The bark is originally smooth and grey, but it becomes rough, flaky, fissured and reddish as the tree matures. The leathery, dark green, glossy leaves appear in opposite pairs, while the pinkish-white, fragrant, bisexual flowers appear in bunches at branch ends in the spring.
The tree very occasionally bears pinkish-red berries.

The hard-pear can sometimes be identified by the strong smell of almonds given off by the crushing of its leaves.

== Distribution ==
Olinia ventosa is a native of the southern and eastern coastal regions of South Africa, from the Cape Peninsula to southern KwaZulu-Natal. Its natural habitat is afro-montane forests, especially the forest margins, as well as coastal scrub and rocky hillsides.

It is now increasingly cultivated throughout South Africa, as a hardy and attractive shade tree for large gardens.

== Uses and cultivation ==
It is very fast-growing, hardy and able to tolerate poor and stony soils. As with most trees, it should not be planted too close to buildings or paved areas. Seeds are readily produced in the fruits, but are difficult to germinate, having a very tough coating that first needs to be removed. Once germinated, the young plants grow very rapidly.

While its wood has historically been valued for furniture-making, its primary use now is as a large shade tree for South African gardens. It is frequently planted for its aesthetic value, with its dense, dark foliage contrasting nicely with the bunches of pinkish-white flowers.

== Chemistry ==
Leaves contain the cyanogenic glucoside prunasin.
