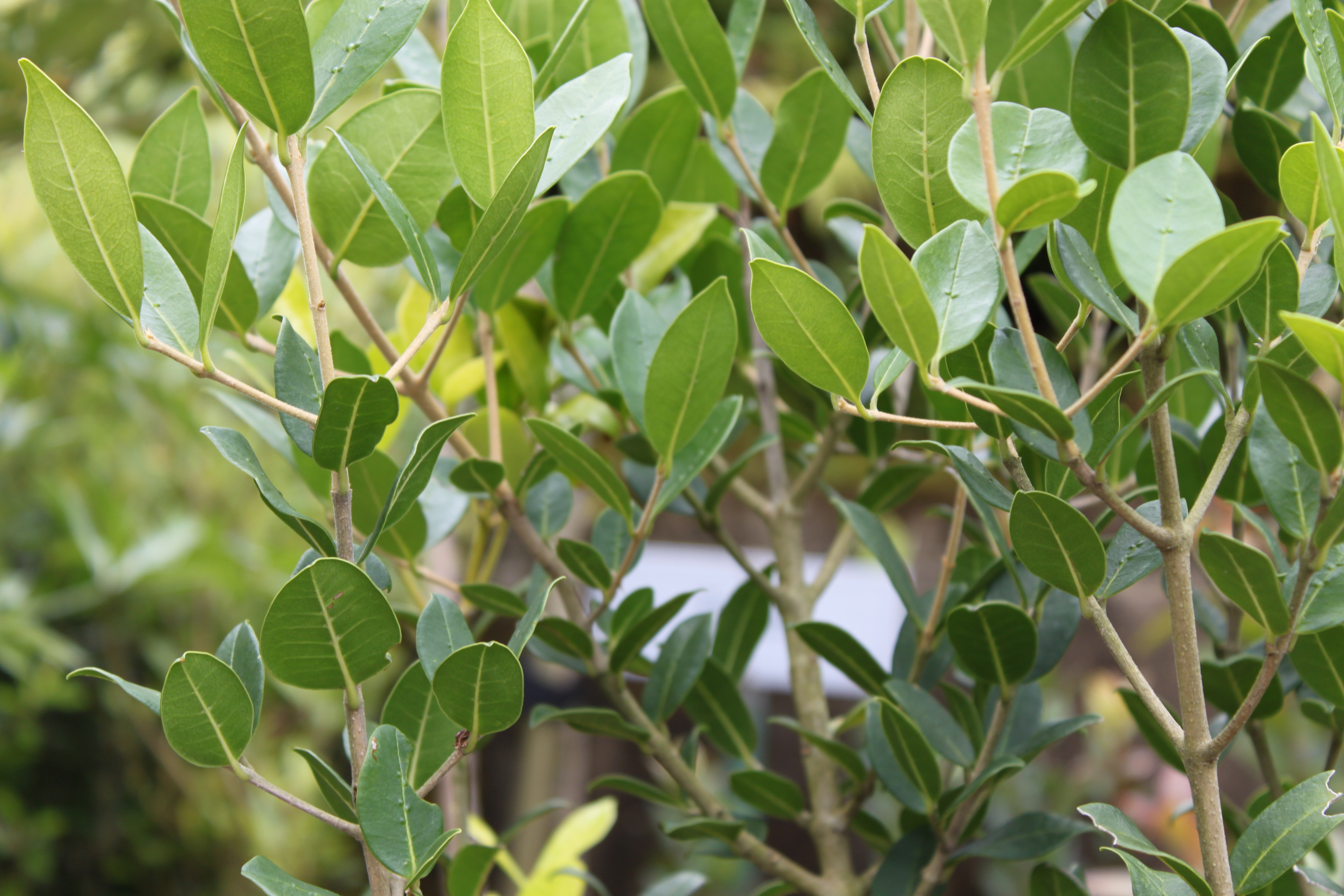

Scientific classification
- Kingdom: Plantae
- Clade: Tracheophytes
- Clade: Angiosperms
- Clade: Eudicots
- Clade: Asterids
- Order: Lamiales
- Family: Oleaceae
- Genus: Chionanthus
- Species: C. foveolatus

Binomial name
- Chionanthus foveolatus (E.Mey.) Stearn

= Chionanthus foveolatus =

Species of tree

Chionanthus foveolatus, commonly known as the pock ironwood or bastard ironwood, is a medium-sized, evergreen, Afromontane tree that is native to South Africa, Eswatini and Malawi.

Chionanthus foveolatus occurs at medium to high altitudes in habitats ranging from bushy or rocky hillsides and mountainous forests to coastal scrub.

It has scaly grey bark and bears clusters of sweetly scented, cream-white flowers from September to December. It is related to the familiar edible olive, and likewise produces fleshy, ovoid, fruits which become black when ripe. It can be grown easily from seed. It can reach a height of about 10 metres in deep forest though it is usually considerably smaller than this, and it has a spread of about 5 metres. It grows well in full sun or semi-shade.

== Description ==
- Family: Oleaceae
- Habit: Small tree with slender trunk, bushy crown and whippy branchlets.
- Height: Ranges from 5 to 8 metres.
- Bark: Light to dark-grey, with scattered corky spots when young
- Leaves: Opposite, simple, elliptic, glossy dark-green, with small bump or pits in the axils of the veins.
- Flower: White to cream, occasionally pink-tinged, sweetly scented, bisexual, in small sprays in the leaf axils. Sept. - Dec.
- Wood: Pale brown, strong and heavy.
- Fruit: Ovoid, fleshy berry, purplish-black when mature. Nov. – July.
