= Cape Winelands Shale Fynbos =

Vegetation type in Western Cape, South Africa

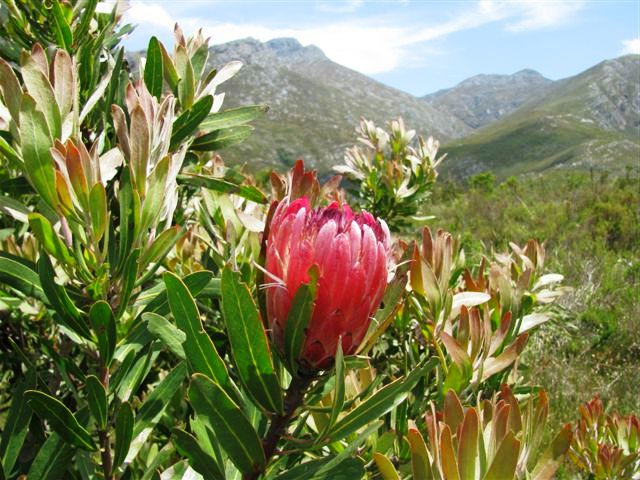
Protea flower in Cape Winelands Shale Fynbos.

Cape Winelands Shale Fynbos is a vegetation type that naturally occurs in the Cape Winelands (or "Boland") of the Western Cape, South Africa.

This vegetation type is found on lower mountain slopes and high, rolling plains in the Western Cape Boland of South Africa. The loamy soils are naturally poor, moist and slightly acidic but the biodiversity is rich.

The vegetation consists of a diverse array of Protea, Erica, geophyte and daisy species, as well as some endemic species. In the moister areas, the Ericas predominate over the other plant groups. This vegetation type is more vulnerable than other types of mountain fynbos, as it typically grows on lower slopes, which tend to be developed for housing or cultivated for farming.

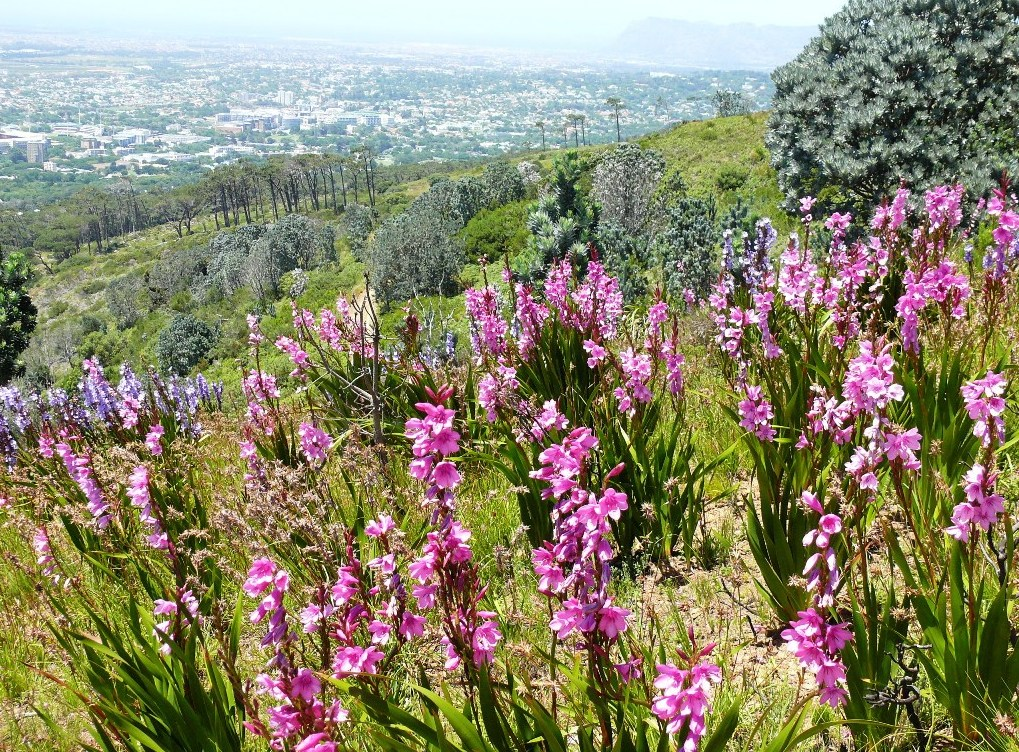
Peninsula Shale Fynbos growing on Devils Peak, Cape Town

== Peninsula Shale Fynbos ==
An isolated patch of this vegetation can also be found further to the west, within the city of Cape Town. Here it is usually known as Peninsula Shale Fynbos and occurs on the lower slopes of Devils Peak as far south as Newlands Forest and Kirstenbosch. On the northern slopes of Devils Peak, it merges into Peninsula Shale Renosterveld. This ecosystem is usually classed as being a type of Cape Winelands Shale Fynbos, although there are differences.

There is a forest of Silvertrees (Leucadendron argenteum) growing in this spot of Peninsula Shale Fynbos, just above Rhodes Memorial. This rare and enormous Protea is typically restricted to the Peninsula Granite Fynbos of Cape Town. It is not known why it grows in the shale fynbos here.

== See also ==
- Biodiversity of Cape Town
- Peninsula Shale Renosterveld
- Peninsula Granite Fynbos
- Cape Floristic Region
- Category:Fynbos - habitats and species.
