= Physical Energy (sculpture) =

Equestrian statue by George Frederic Watts

Coordinates: 51.5068°N 0.1783°W

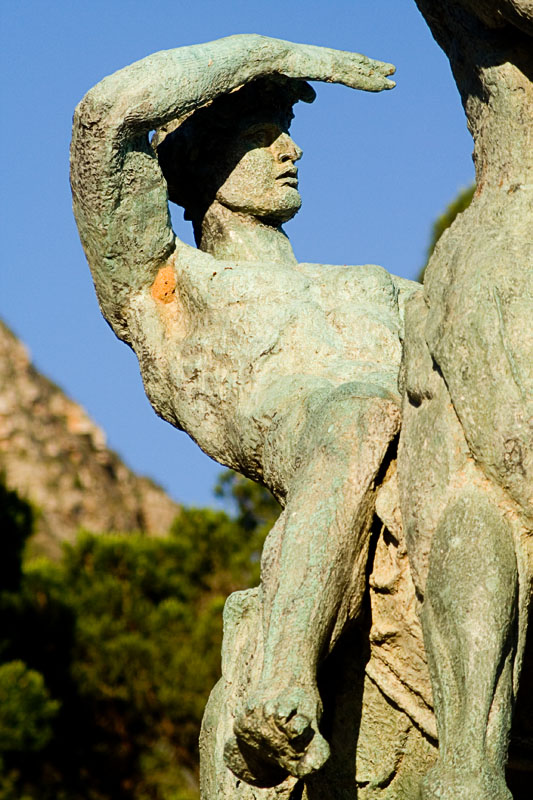
Detail of Physical Energy at Rhodes Memorial in Cape Town, South Africa.

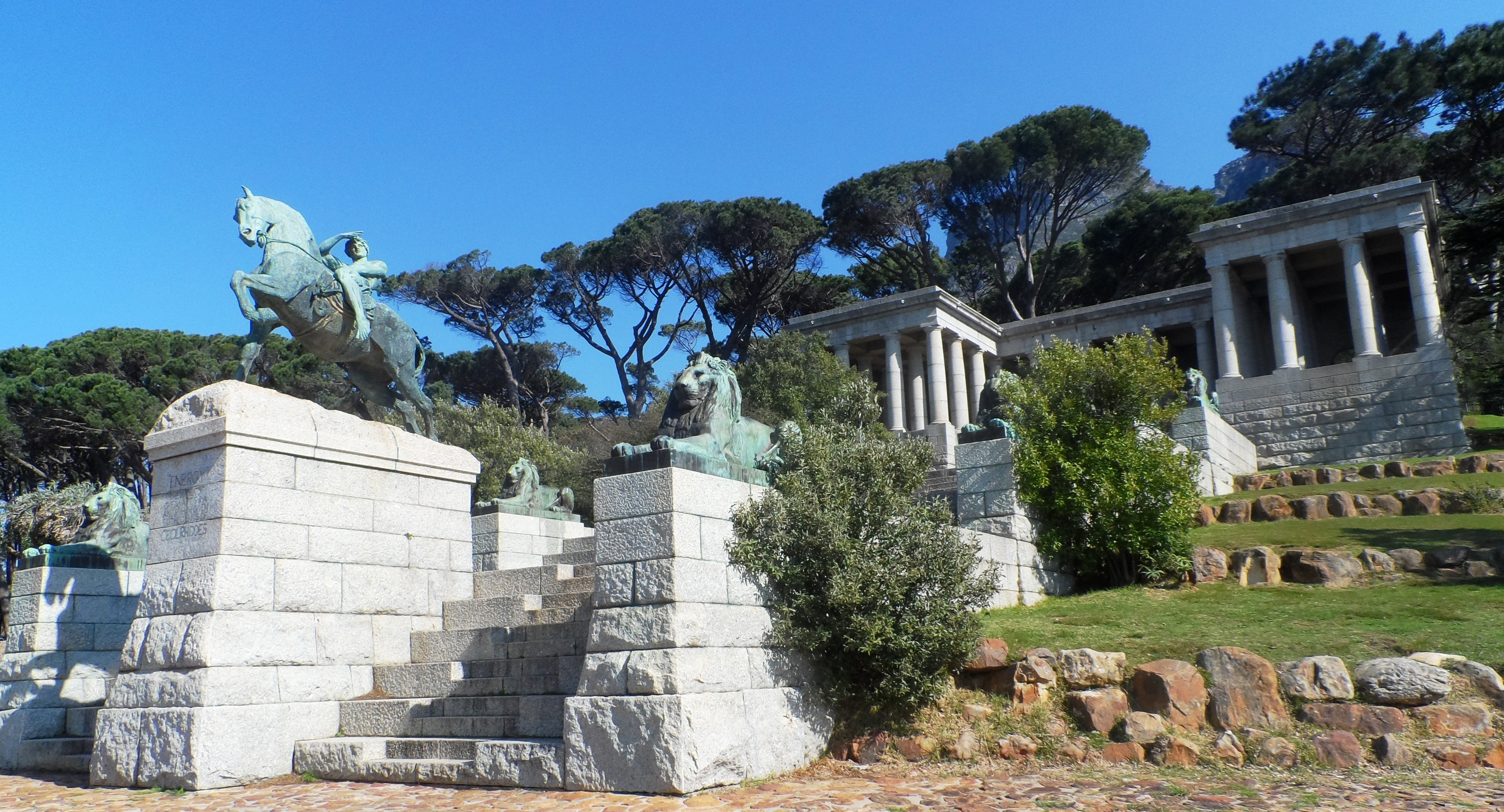
Physical Energy at Rhodes Memorial in Cape Town, South Africa.

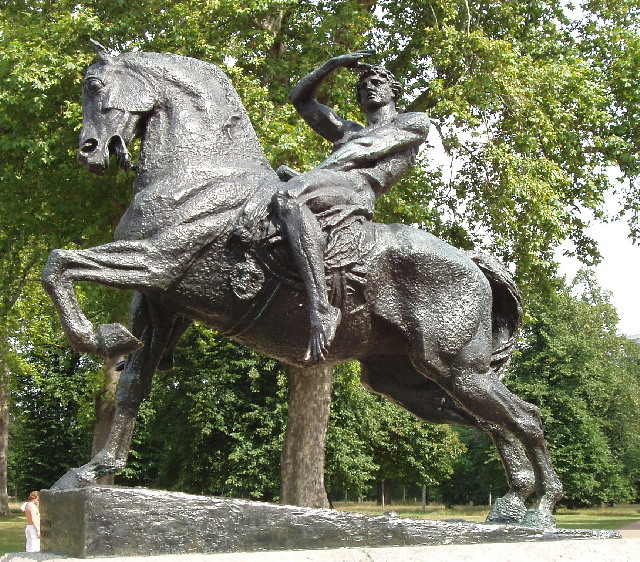
Physical Energy at Kensington Gardens, London

Physical Energy is a bronze equestrian statue by the English artist George Frederic Watts. Watts was principally a painter, but also worked on sculptures from the 1870s. Physical Energy was first cast in 1902, two years before his death, and was intended to be Watts's memorial to "unknown worth". Watts said it was a symbol of "that restless physical impulse to seek the still unachieved in the domain of material things". The original plaster model is at Watts Gallery in Compton, Surrey, and there are four full-size bronze casts: one in London, one in Cape Town, one in Harare and one sited at Watts Gallery. Other smaller bronze casts were also made after Watts's death.

== Background ==
The sculpture is based on Watts's earlier colossal bronze equestrian statue of Hugh Lupus, 1st Earl of Chester, commissioned in 1870 by his namesake Hugh Lupus Grosvenor, later 1st Duke of Westminster. The earlier work was completed in 1883-1884 and displayed at Eaton Hall, Cheshire. That statue was itself based on equestrian elements of the Elgin Marbles.

Watts started work on Physical Energy in the early 1880s. The original 3.5 ton gesso grosso model (made of plaster mixed with glue size and hemp or tow) is at the Watts Gallery at Compton near Guildford. He was assisted by George Thompson and Louis Deuchars. The sculpture depicts a nude male figure on a rearing horse, set on a rectangular wedge-shaped base; the man's left hand holds the reins, while he shades his eyes from the sun with the right as he looks to the left. In the artist's own words, it is "a symbol of that restless physical impulse to seek the still unachieved in the domain of material things".

Physical Energy was the culmination of Watts's ambition in the field of public sculpture, embodying the artist's belief that access to great art would bring immense benefits to the country at large, Watts conceived Physical Energy as an allegory of human vitality and humanity’s ceaseless struggle for betterment.

Watts was reluctant to finalise and cast the work, despite encouragement from Millais to have it cast as early as 1886. Watts continued to modify the gesso model. It wasn’t until 1902 that the model was first cast in bronze.

== Casts ==
The first full-size bronze cast of the sculpture was made at the Parlanti Foundry in Fulham in 1902. It was claimed to be the largest sculpture ever cast in bronze in Britain. Watts gave the statue to the British Government. Physical Energy was exhibited in the courtyard at Burlington House for the Royal Academy Summer Exhibition in 1904, the year of Watts's death. It was originally suggested that the statue be erected at the burial place of Cecil Rhodes in the Matopo Hills in Southern Rhodesia. Due to logistical impracticalities it was instead installed as part of the Rhodes Memorial on Devil's Peak above Groote Schuur near Cape Town, South Africa.

A second large cast was made in 1905, designed as a gift to the nation. It was cast at A.B. Burton's Thames Ditton Foundry in London. More refined, the second cast weighs 6 tons, and took eighteen months to create. It was delivered to London's Kensington Gardens, in September 1907, and unveiled at a site overlooking the north-west side of the Serpentine.

A third full-size version of Physical Energy was cast in bronze in 1959, from the gesso model used for second cast. It differs slightly: for example, the rein appears on the right, like the first cast, rather than on the left, like the second cast. The British South Africa Company arranged for the statue to be cast at Leonard Grist's Corinthian Bronze Company foundry in London. It was originally located in front of the High Court building in Lusaka in Zambia. It was moved to a racecourse on the outskirts of Salisbury, in Southern Rhodesia (now Harare, in Zimbabwe). Since 1981, it has stood in the grounds of the National Archives in Harare.

A fourth full-size bronze was commissioned by the Watts Gallery for the 200th anniversary of Watts's birth, and cast by Pangolin Editions in 2017 using a new mould made from the original gesso model. It was exhibited in the Annenberg Courtyard at the Royal Academy in 2017-18 as part of their bicentenary celebrations. The sculpture was installed in the grounds of Watts Gallery near Limnerslease, the artist's home, in 2025.

Several smaller bronze versions were cast posthumously and sold commercially. One was exhibited at the Royal Academy in 1904. One example by Watts's assistant, Thomas Wren in 1914, sold by Bonhams for £40,000 in June 2014. Others in the collection of the Watts Gallery, at the Laing Art Gallery in Newcastle, the Harris Museum and Art Gallery in Preston, the Walker Art Gallery in Liverpool, and the Gibberd Gallery in Harlow.

In 1960, at the unveiling of the Lusaka statue, Godfrey Huggins, 1st Viscount Malvern presented the Queen Mother with a silver replica of Physical Energy cast from a plaster model made by Sydney Harpley.

== Other uses ==
The model of the statue was previously used as the logo for Watts Gallery. It also features as part of Rhodes University's logo, and the sculpture appears as a crest on its arms. An image of Physical Energy was used by the Labour Publishing Company Ltd in the 1920s. An image of the sculpture was also used as a trade mark for products such as Energen Rolls in the 1930s.

The sculpture was one of the inspirations for Charles Villiers Stanford's Sixth Symphony, composed in memory of Watts.

The Kensington Gardens cast is featured on the covers of some CD reissues of Coil’s album Horse Rotorvator, captured from a fisheye lens.
