= Groote Schuur Zoo =

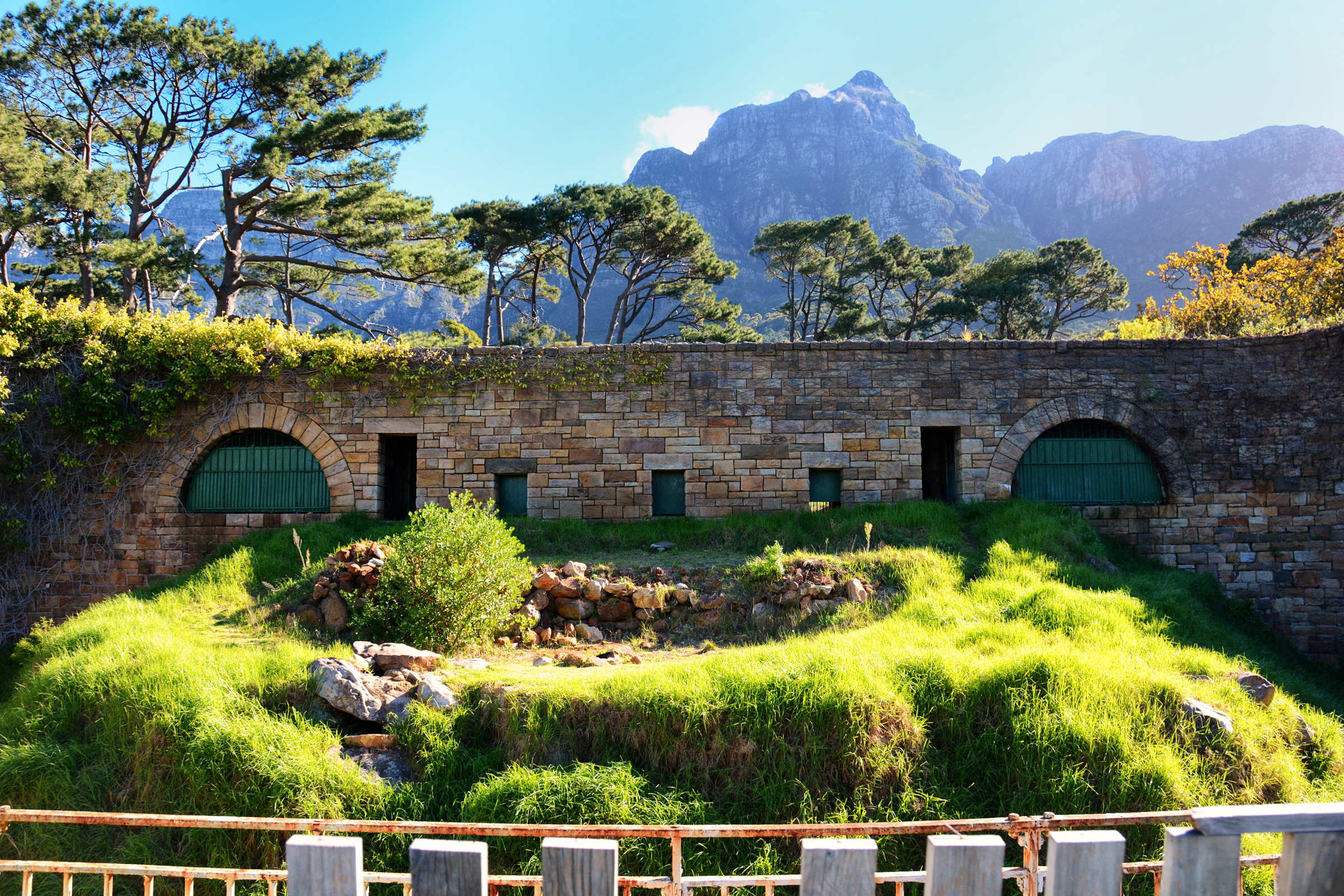
- Lion's den after abandonment
- Interactive map of Groote Schuur Zoo
- 33°57′43″S 18°27′32″E
- Date opened: 1931
- Date closed: Around 1980
- Location: Cape Town, South Africa
- Land area: 2 ha (4.9 acres)

The Groote Schuur Zoo was a 2-hectare (4.9-acre) zoo in Cape Town, South Africa. Established in 1931 at the request of deceased Cecil Rhodes, it was free of charge and a very popular attraction in Cape Town until its closure sometime between 1975 and 1985. The zoo shut down due to a combination of the financial burden that the Apartheid government faced and an increase in animal welfare standards. During its operation, it housed many animals including lions, emus, crocodiles and tahrs. The zoo can still be visited today, as it has been abandoned and left open to the public. The most prominent feature of the zoo is the Lion's Den, both when it was open and today where it still stands, full of overgrown vegetation.

== History ==
In 1893, Cecil Rhodes purchased the Rhodes Estate (which comprises the University of Cape Town, the Rhodes Memorial and the zoo). He had a herbivorous menagerie on his estate and in 1896 he was gifted two lions and a leopard, for which he built an extension onto the menagerie to house the creatures. Originally he had elaborate designs for the house, but only a small house was built. Upon his death he bequeathed his estate to the state, and in 1930 the Lion house was torn down. The following year new enclosures were built to house the animals and the site became known as Groote Schuur Zoo.

== Lion attacks ==
In 1974, three students attempted to kidnap a lion cub in a drunken escapade following a University of Cape Town (UCT) rugby win. One of the students, a winger on the team, was bitten by one of the lionesses and rushed to hospital, where he fought infection for six months before eventually recovering. It is alleged that the remains of a body of a drifter was found one morning at the bottom of the pit in an unrelated incident, but that it was covered up.

== Legacy ==
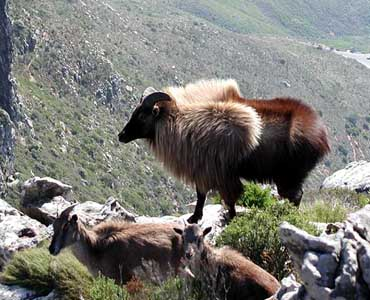
Tahrs on Devil's Peak

While today the only physical remains are the abandoned buildings, the zoo has a notable legacy. At one point during its operation, two tahrs, a breed of Himalayan mountain goat, escaped up Table Mountain. These goats bred a significant population which resided upon the mountain. In 2000, the decision was made to control the population through culling due to the environmental damage they caused, and while they are rare, there is still a population of goats on the mountain. Another notable escapee that flourished was the common starling, which can now still be found in South Africa.
