= Devil's Peak (Cape Town) =

Mountain peak in Cape Town, South Africa

- Duiwelspiek
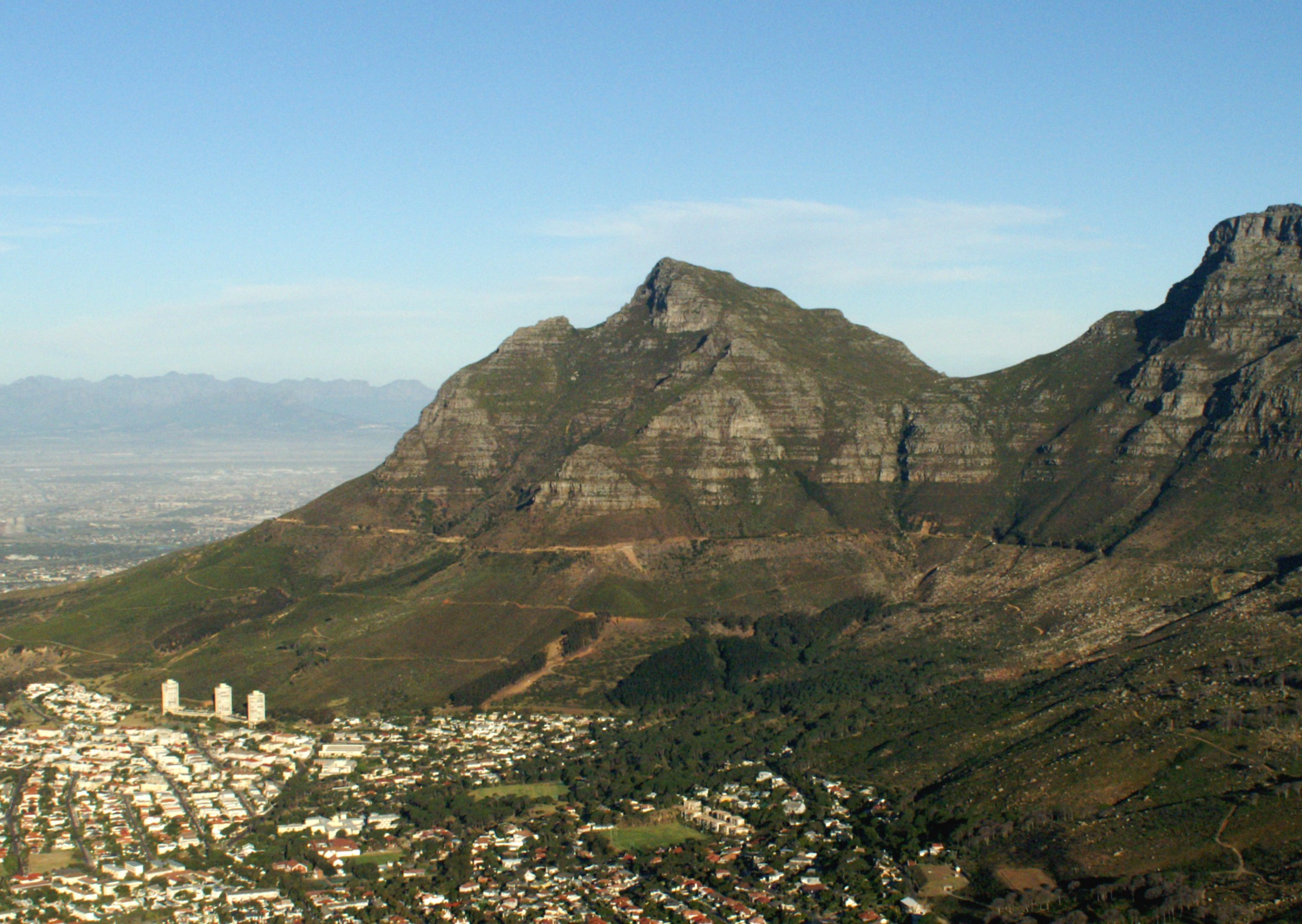
- Devil's Peak seen from Lion's Head. Hottentots Holland range in the distance

Highest point
- Elevation: 1,000 m (3,300 ft)
- Coordinates: 33°57′17.11″S 18°26′21.35″E

Geography
- Location: Western Cape, South Africa

Geology
- Rock age: Silurian/Ordovician

Climbing
- Easiest route: Hike

Devil's Peak is part of the mountainous backdrop to Cape Town, South Africa. When looking at Table Mountain from the city centre, or when looking towards the city across Table Bay, the skyline from left to right consists of Devil's Peak, the flat summit of Table Mountain, the peak of Lion's Head, and Signal Hill.

The central districts of Cape Town are located within this natural amphitheatre. The city grew out of a settlement founded on the shore below the mountains in 1652 by Jan van Riebeeck, for the Dutch East India Company. Some of the first farms in the Cape were established on the slopes of Devil's Peak, along the Liesbeek River.

Devil's Peak stands 1,000 metres (3,281 ft) high, less than Table Mountain's 1,087 metres (3,566 ft), and there are a number of hiking routes to the summit.

== Landmarks ==
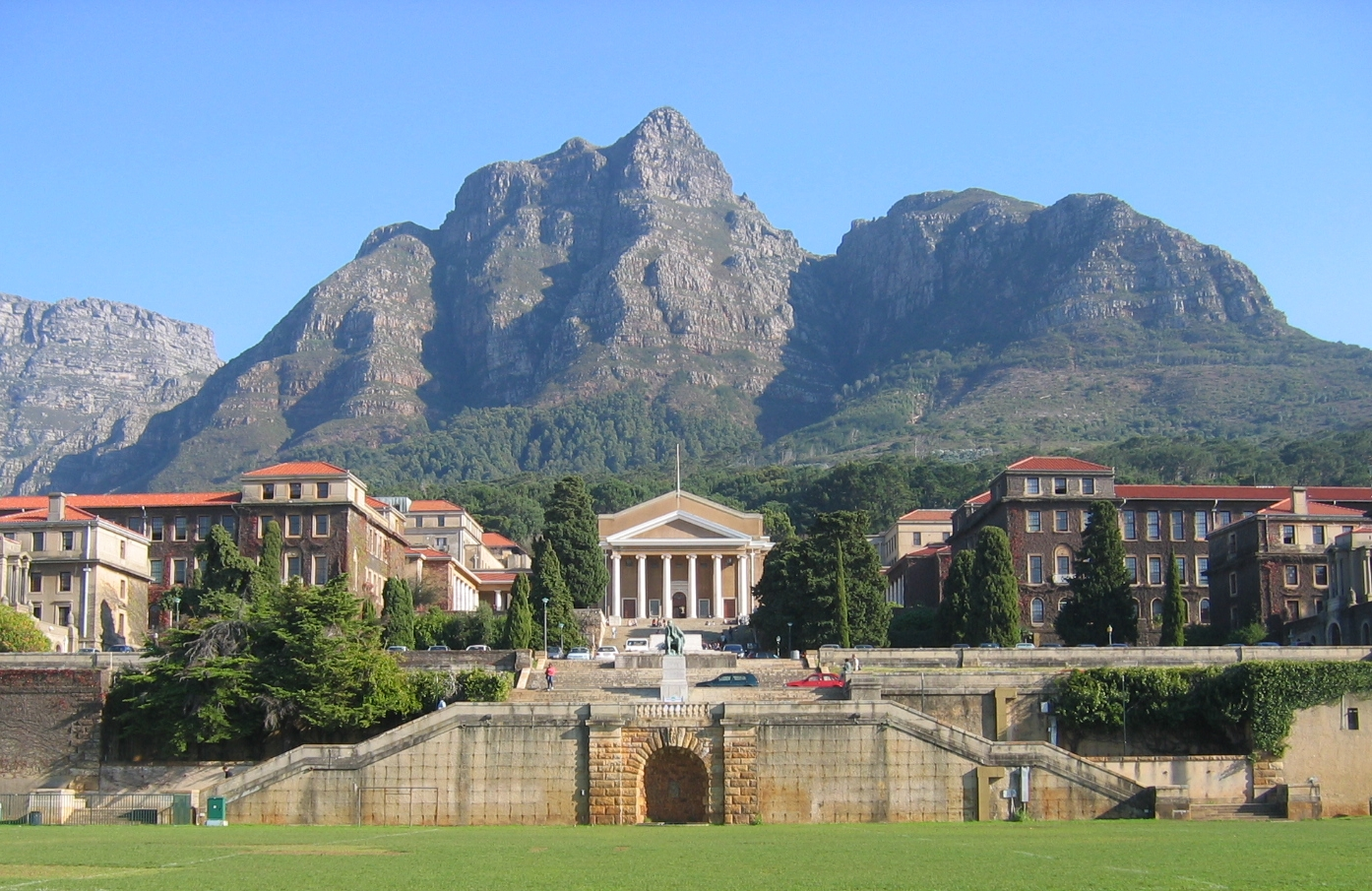
Devil's Peak with the University of Cape Town's Upper Campus situated on its slopes.

The Rhodes Memorial to Cecil Rhodes, and the University of Cape Town are situated on the eastern slopes of Devil's Peak. Other landmarks on the eastern slopes are Mostert's Mill, Groote Schuur Hospital, and the Groote Schuur estate, including a number of presidential and ministerial residences.

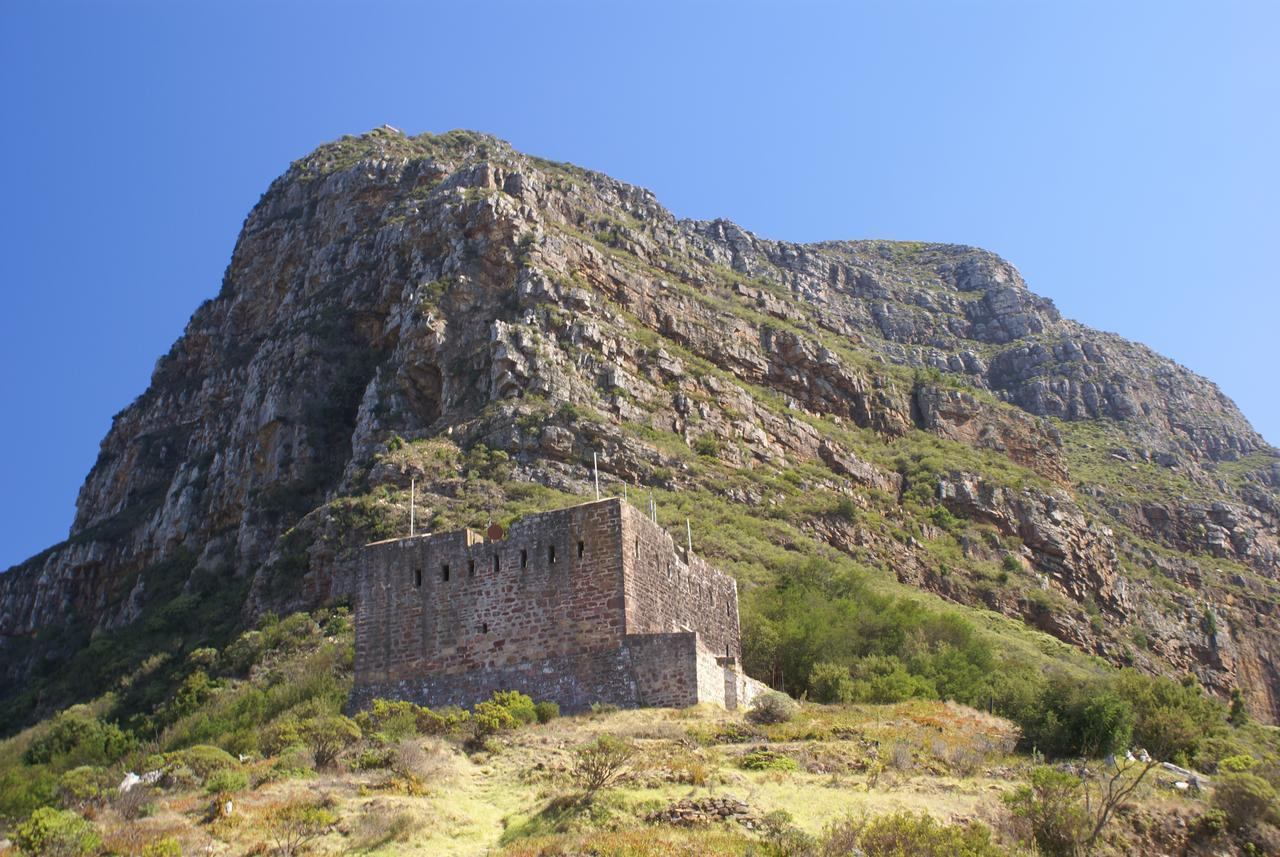
The King's Blockhouse, situated on Mowbray Ridge

A number of historic military blockhouses are situated on Devil's Peak, along with a number of cannons intended to defend the city from attack from the south. There is an abandoned fire lookout high up on Mowbray Ridge.

== Hiking ==
The lower slopes of Devil's Peak are home to a number of very pleasant walks, including those around Newlands Forest, Rhodes Memorial, and Deer Park. As of January 2026, crime poses a threat to hikers, particularly in this area; for this reason, hikers seeking access to Devil's Peak are advised to do so via Newlands Forest.

Popular hikes along the lower slopes of the mountain include landmarks such as King's Blockhouse, Woodstock Cave, and First and Second Waterfalls.

The peak itself can be accessed from a number of routes. Popular routes up to the saddle between Table Mountain and Devil's Peak include Newlands Ravine and Saddle Ravine. More experienced hikers may consider accessing the saddle via more challenging routes, such as Els Ravine, Els Buttress, Dark Gorge and Dark Gully. Hikers, regardless of experience level, should ensure that they avoid Second Waterfall Ravine, a route which has been associated with a number of fatalities on the mountain. From the saddle, a straightforward path climbs to the top of the mountain. Other routes, not involving the saddle, include: Oppelskop Ridge, Mowbray Ridge, First Waterfall Ravine, and Eastern Buttress.

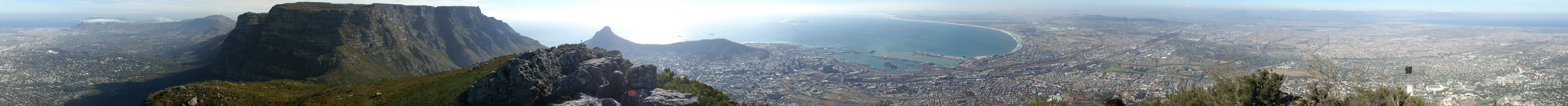
A 360° panorama of the Cape Town surrounds as seen from Devil's Peak. Table Mountain is obvious, occupying a large portion of the view. The edges of the panorama point approximately southeast.

== Vegetation ==
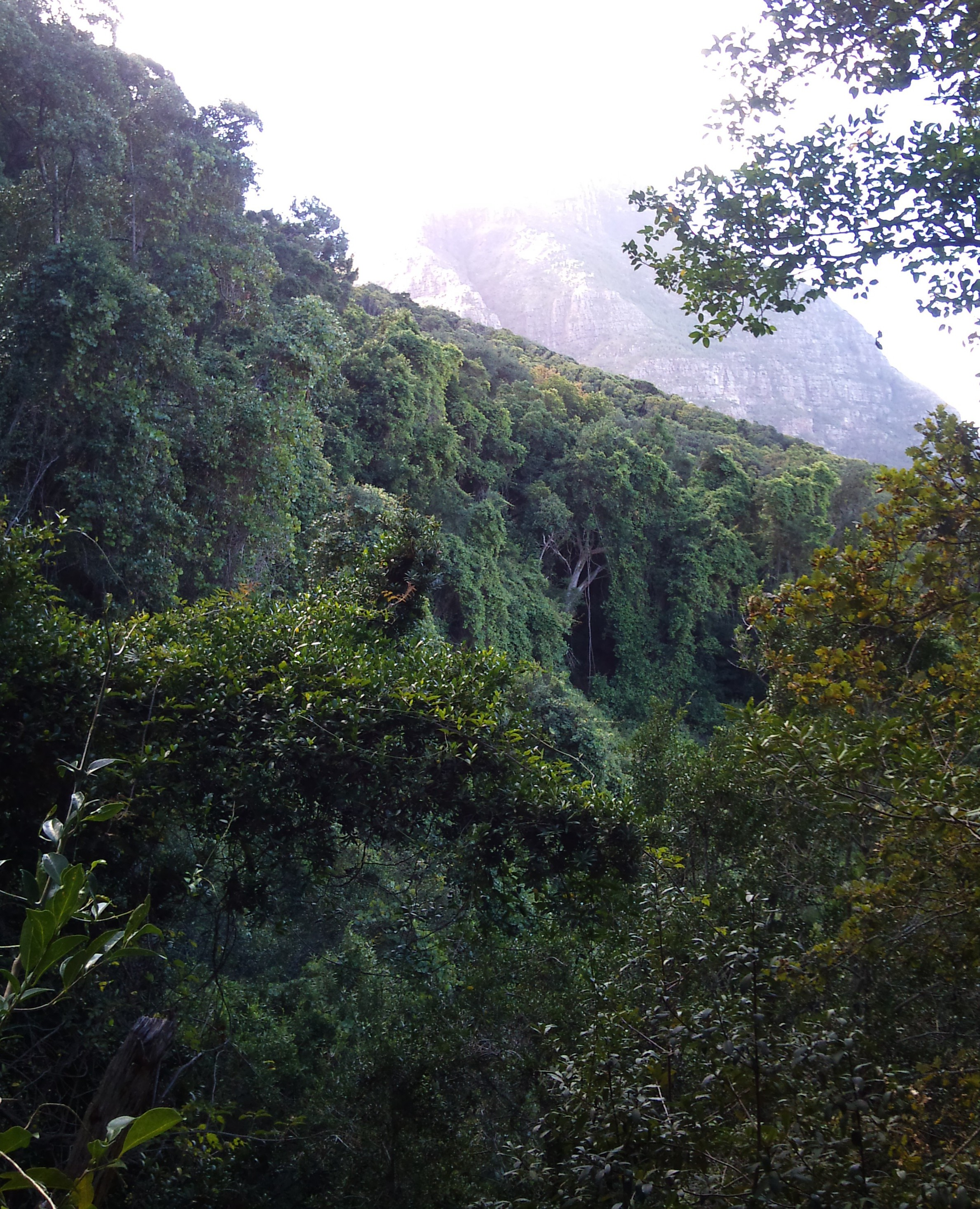
Indigenous forest growing on the southern slopes of Devil's Peak

The northern slopes overlooking the city centre are covered in typical Cape Peninsula Shale Fynbos. These slopes are hotter and prone to frequent fires, and as a result the vegetation is low. Here can also be found a small stretch of critically endangered Peninsula Shale Renosterveld vegetation, an endemic vegetation type that used to dominate the Cape Town City Bowl but is now mostly lost due to urban development.

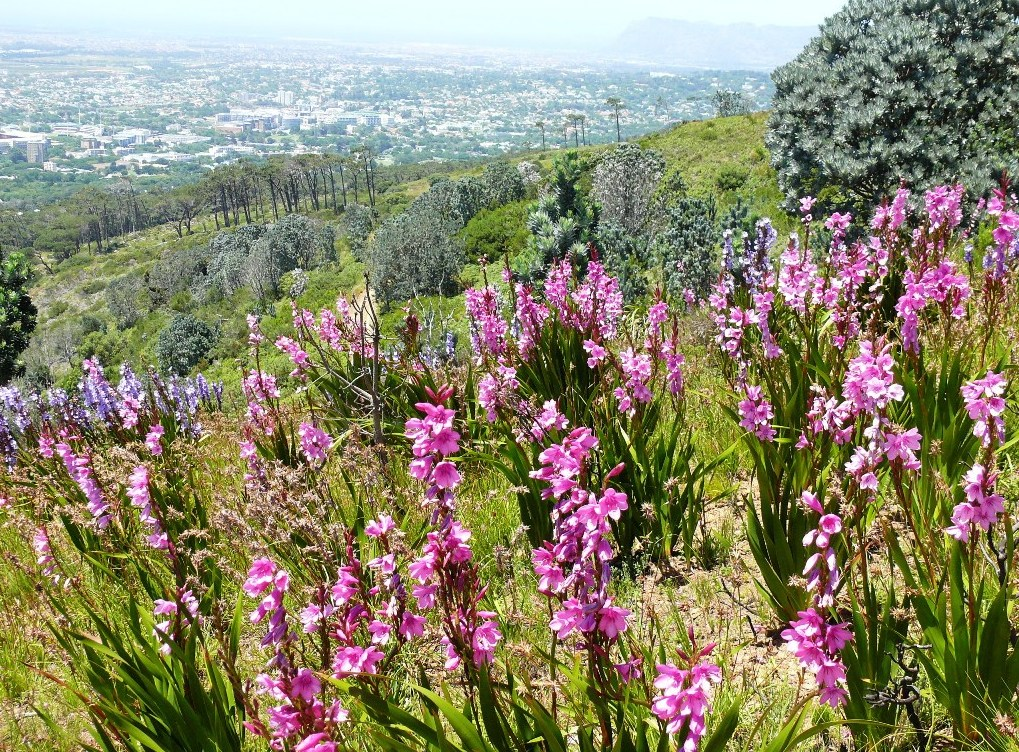
Peninsula Shale Fynbos growing on the northern slopes of Devil's Peak

The slopes on the Southern Suburbs side however, are naturally wetter and more protected from fires, so these slopes were originally partially covered with deep indigenous forests. Some of these dense afro-montane forests still remain in the gorges, but most of them were cut down to make way for commercial pine plantations. Near Rhodes Memorial there are a stands of the native silver tree, one of the few remaining areas where the tree still grows wild.

During the second half of the 19th century and the first half of the 20th, Devil's Peak (and other adjacent heights) were commercially planted with plantations of cluster pines, a problematic invasive non-indigenous tree. More recently, local authorities and volunteers felled the pines from the higher slopes while maintaining pine and gum plantations in Newlands Forest on the lower reaches of the mountain for recreational purposes. The original indigenous Afro-montane forest is also slowly re-growing on the southern slopes and above Newlands forest where the pines have been cleared, with programmes to remove pines and other alien vegetation continuing. Stone pines (a non-invasive alien tree) still remain in the area around Rhodes Memorial.

== Fauna ==
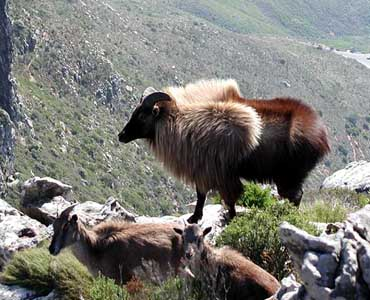
Tahr herd on Devil's Peak before culling began.

Indigenous animals include porcupines, caracals, small grey mongoose, rock hyraxes (also known as dassies), and many species of bird. Near Rhodes Memorial, some of the lower slopes of Devil's Peak were artificially maintained as savanna, with eland, wildebeest and zebra kept there, with the zebras forming part of the Quagga Project. These animals were removed from the enclosure in early 2018 due to the uncertain water supply during the Cape Town water crisis.

In the 1930s, a few Himalayan tahrs (wild goats) escaped from a zoo on the slopes of Devil's Peak and bred until their population on the Table Mountain range was over 700. A culling programme has eliminated most of them, although a few still remain. Some of the original local species of small antelope are being re-introduced to replace the tahrs. Fallow deer were once kept in the area of Rhodes Memorial, but were removed starting in 2006.

== Geology ==
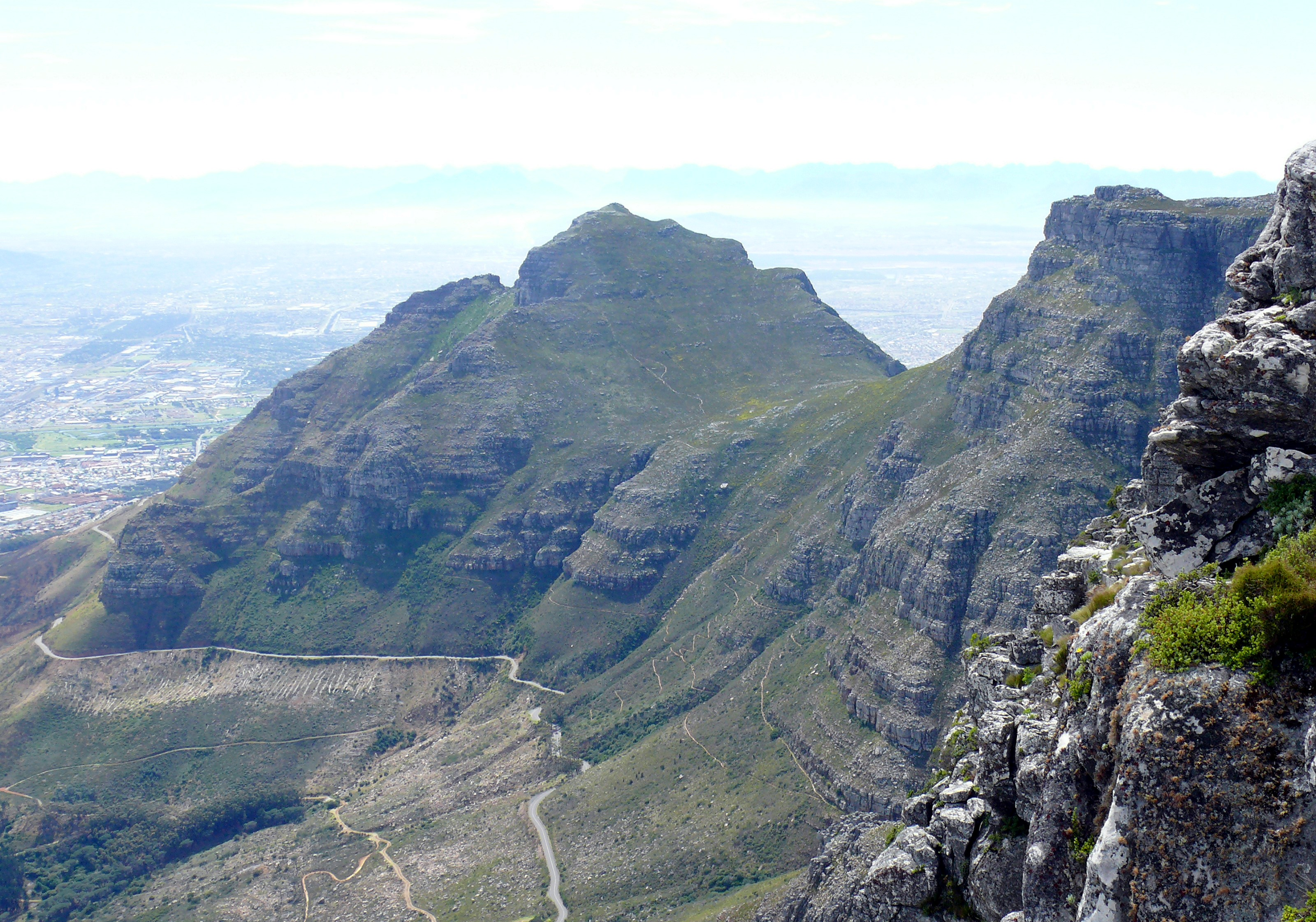
Devil's Peak as viewed from the Summit of Table Mountain.

The upper, rocky parts of Devil's Peak, Table Mountain and Lion's Head consist of a hard, uniform and resistant sandstone commonly known as the Table Mountain sandstone or TMS. (This is, however, no longer used as a formal geological name). The tough sandstone rests conformably upon a basal shale that in turn lies unconformably upon a basement of older (Late Precambrian) rocks (Malmesbury shale/slate and the Cape Granite). The basal shale and the older rocks below it weather much faster than the TMS and for this reason the lower slopes are smoother in all parts, with few outcrops and deeper soil. Millions of years of erosion have stripped all of the TMS from Signal Hill and that is why it looks very rounded compared to its sister peaks. There is a road that runs almost on the contour from the lower cable station on Table Mountain along the mountain to Devil's Peak. As it turns east around the bulk of Devil's Peak the road cuttings expose a few famous geological unconformities, which illustrate very clearly that the Malmesbury rocks were folded, baked, intruded by granite and planed down by millions of years of erosion before the area sank below the ocean and a new sequence of sediments, including the TMS, began to accumulate.

== Origins of the name ==
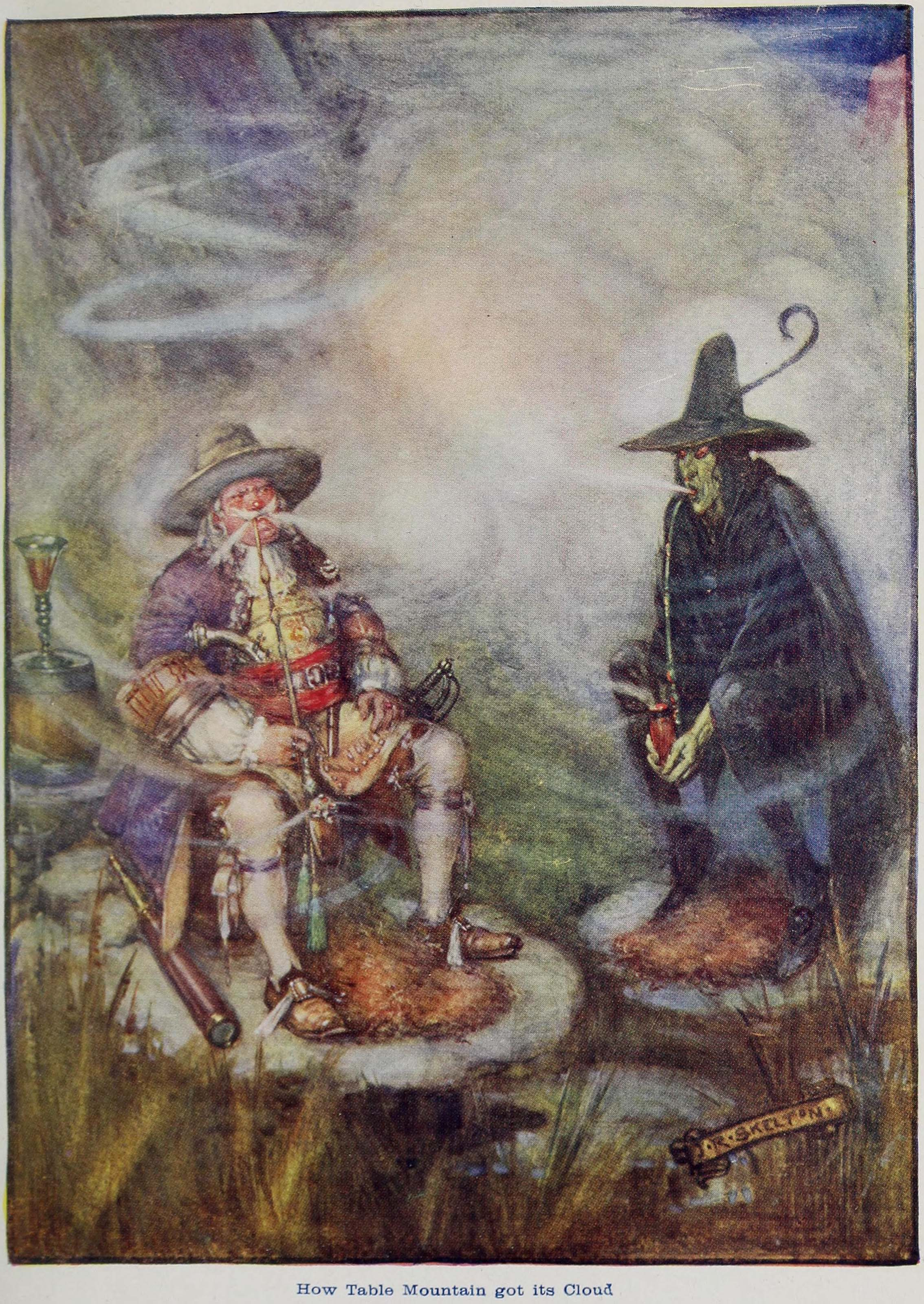
Jan van Hunks smoking with the Devil.

Devil's Peak was originally known as Windberg or Charles Mountain. The English term Devil's Peak is a 19th-century translation from the Dutch Duivels Kop, and supposedly comes from the folk-tale about a Dutch man called Jan van Hunks, a prodigious pipe smoker who lived at the foot of the mountain circa 1700. He was forced by his wife to leave the house whenever he smoked his pipe. One day, while smoking on the slopes of the peak, he met a mysterious stranger who also smoked. They each bragged of how much they smoked and so they fell into a pipe-smoking contest. The stranger turned out to be the devil and Van Hunks eventually won the contest, but not before the smoke that they had made had covered the mountain, forming the table cloth cloud. The story was captured by the 19th century poet Dante Gabriel Rossetti in his poem Jan van Hunks (alternatively called The Dutchman's Wager). However, since Rossetti's poem was only published in 1909, it's unlikely that this was the true source of the name, rather an urban legend.

It has been claimed that the name is a corruption of Duifespiek ("Dove's Peak") to Duivelspiek ("Devil's Peak"), since the Dutch words for devil and dove are relatively close in sound. The Dutch word "Duivelspiek" has been the common Afrikaans language name for the mountain and the suburb on the east side of the city bowl. The name may have been derived from the mountain's 'three pronged' spear shape, which is reminiscent of the spear held by the Devil in many images.

Another explanation is provided by Devil's Peak Brewery. Forty years before Vasco de Gama rounded the Cape in 1497, the Venetian cartographer Fra Mauro created a map of the world for King Alfonso V of Portugal, based on knowledge drawn from the Arabians. On this map, which became the definitive view of the world for the early Portuguese explorers, he named the southernmost tip of Africa Cabo de Diab – the Devil's Cape. It is possible the association with the devil migrated from there to the mountain.

== 1971 plane crash ==
On 26 May 1971, three South African Air Force Hawker-Siddeley HS125 (Code named Mercurius) aircraft crashed into Devil's Peak, killing all 11 on board. The aircraft were flying in close formation, practicing for a fly-past during the upcoming 10th-anniversary Republic Day celebrations on 31 May. The aircraft, flying by sight along the N2 highway, banked to the right three seconds too late, crashing into the side of the mountain not far above Rhodes Memorial and the University of Cape Town. A low cloud base was cited as a contributory factor. The impact was heard throughout the surrounding suburbs. For many years a radar reflector beacon stood on Plumpudding Hill above Rhodes Memorial to prevent similar incidents.

== Records ==
In March 2025, aged 2 months and 13 days, Flo Daynes became the youngest documented person to reach the summit of Devil's Peak.

== See also ==
- Table Mountain – Mountain overlooking Cape Town, South Africa
- Cape Town – Legislative capital of South Africa
