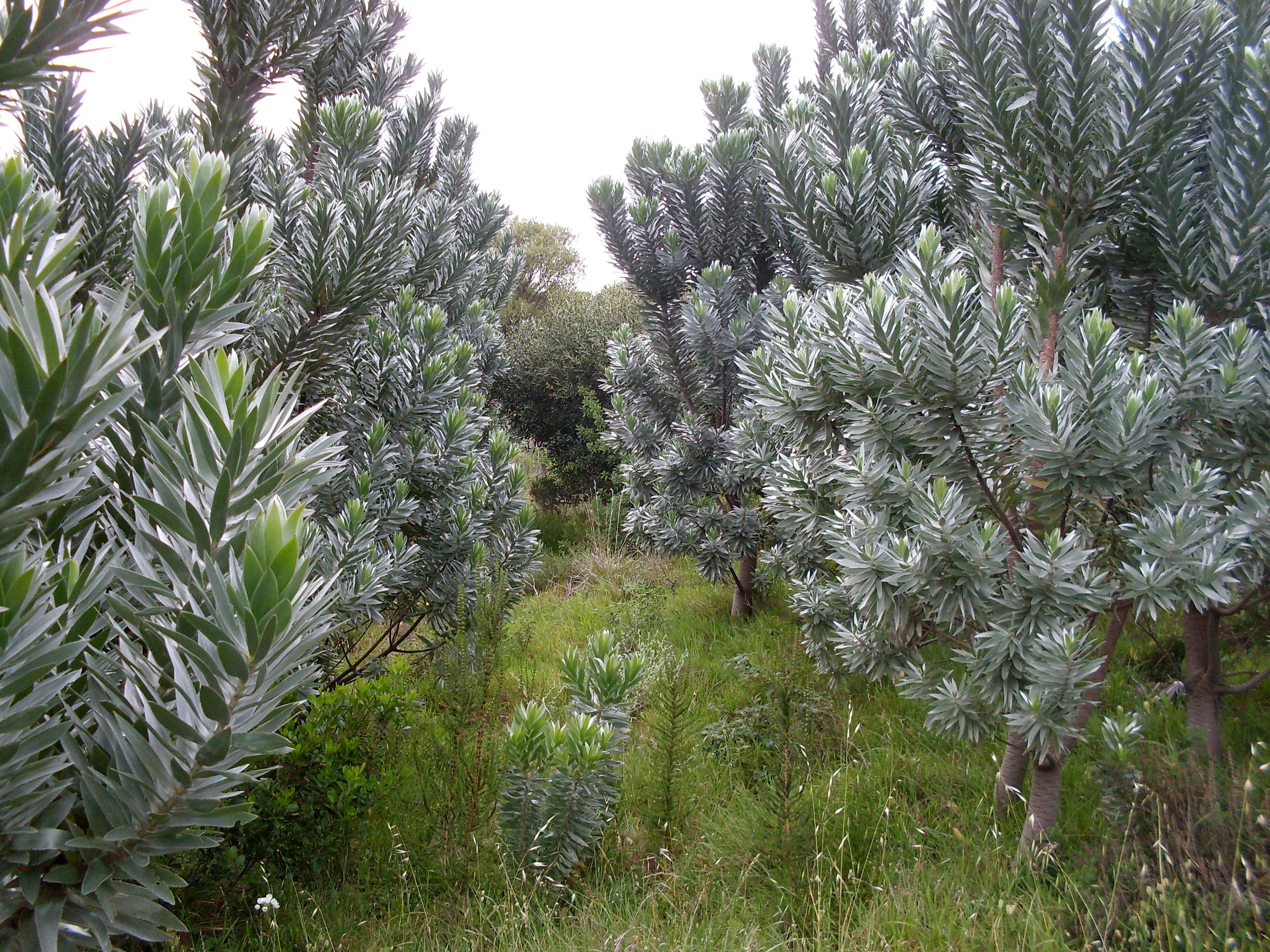
- Young silvertrees on Table Mountain, Cape Town

Conservation status
- Vulnerable (IUCN 3.1)

Scientific classification
- Kingdom: Plantae
- Clade: Tracheophytes
- Clade: Angiosperms
- Clade: Eudicots
- Order: Proteales
- Family: Proteaceae
- Genus: Leucadendron
- Species: L. argenteum

Binomial name
- Leucadendron argenteum (L.) R.Br.
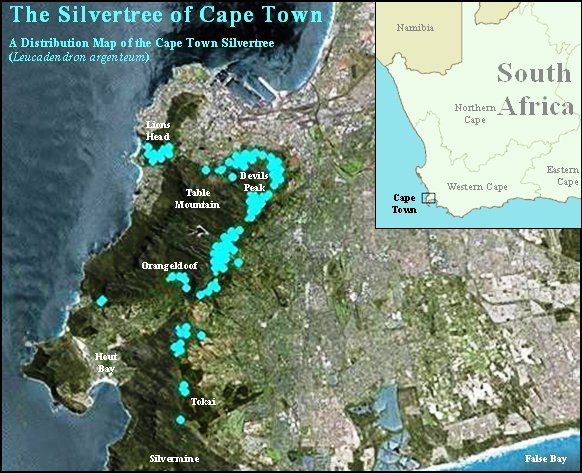
- Map of the extant population of silvertrees in the Cape Peninsula

Synonyms
- Protea argentea L.

= Leucadendron argenteum =

Silver tree

Species of tree

Leucadendron argenteum (silver tree, silver leaf tree, Afrikaans: Witteboom, or Afrikaans: Silwerboom) is an endangered plant species in the family Proteaceae, which is endemic to a small area of the Cape Peninsula, South Africa. Most grow in and around the city of Cape Town, but outlying (perhaps introduced) populations exist near Somerset West (Silwerboomkloof), Paarl and Stellenbosch. It is a protected tree in South Africa.

== Appearance ==
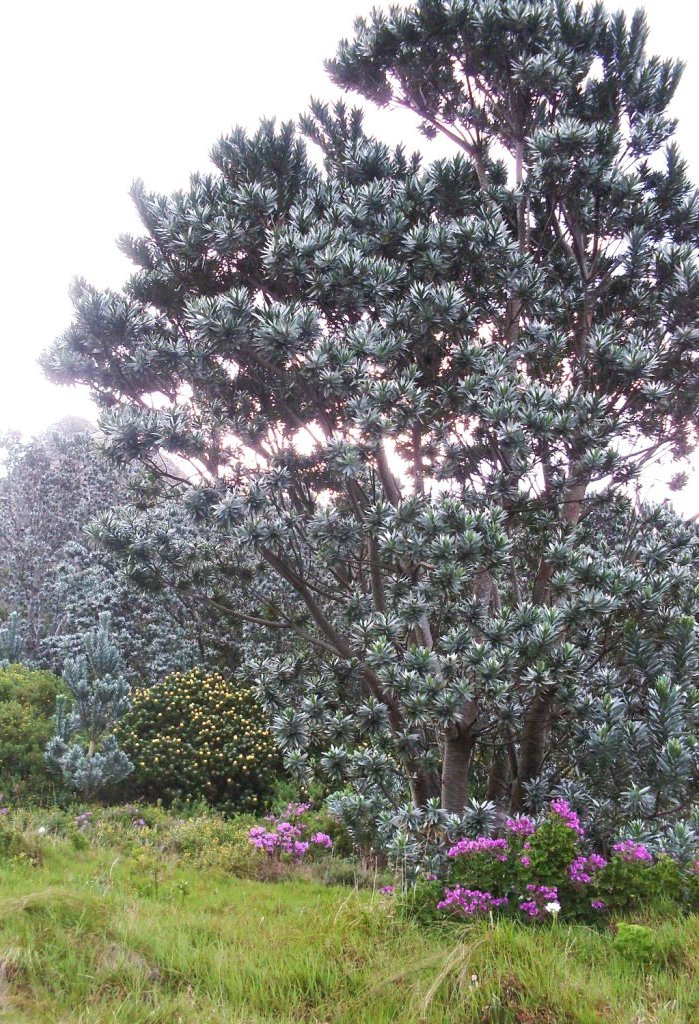
Adult specimen growing on the eastern slopes of Table Mountain, near Rhodes Memorial.

The silvertree is a striking evergreen tree, growing 5–7 m tall (sometimes up to 16 m). It is erect and well-proportioned with a thick, straight trunk and grey bark. The soft, silky leaves are shiny silver, lanceolate, 8–15 cm long and 2 cm broad, with their distinct silvery sheen produced by dense velvety hairs. The wind-pollinated flowers are produced in dense pink, globose inflorescences 4–5 cm diameter, and give off a pleasant scent. Like all Leucadendron species, this tree is dioecious, with separate male and female plants. The fruit is a heavy woody cone, containing numerous seeds; each seed is a small nut with a silky-haired helicopter-like parachute, enabling it to disperse by wind. After germination it pushes up two green, bare and leathery cotyledons.

== Distribution ==
This enormous silver Protea-relative is naturally confined to a tiny area in and around the city of Cape Town. Its main population grows on the slopes of Table Mountain, notably the Lion's Head area, above Rhodes Memorial and the mountain slopes above Kirstenbosch National Botanical Garden.

In addition, there are three tiny outlying populations nearby, in Stellenbosch, Somerset West and Paarl, though it has not yet been established for certain whether these are natural outliers, or were planted here in early Cape history. The Somerset West population is located within a natural heritage site called Silvertree Gorge, in the Spanish Farm suburb.

Historically, the silvertree was more widespread on Table Mountain, covering much of its slopes in shimmering silver forests. However, early demand for timber led to much of these forests being felled and now the silvertree is a rare and endangered species.

== Status and conservation ==
Table Mountain is perhaps the only place where these trees grow naturally, as the populations near Stellenbosch and Paarl (though conceivably natural) may have been introduced from Table Mountain.

In the face of urban development, inappropriate fire management, and invasive alien trees such as pines and gums, silvertrees have been driven from about 74% of their natural range. Mortality of these short-lived trees is negligible after a burn, but then increases to about 5% per annum. During a longer term absence of burns however, sudden die-offs may occur, even in a matter of hours. This is believed to be the combined result of (warm) berg winds and diseased roots which are weakened by Phytophthora root rot which inhibits their water absorption.

An estimated 40 to 50 percent of the extant native population burned in the fire of 26 to 27 January 2006. As recruitment of seedlings only occurs naturally after fire, this was a necessary stage in the life-cycle of this Fynbos species, and the population has recovered totally.

A major deterrent to propagation of the silver leaf tree is its short life span, as most don't live more than 20 years. This doesn't affect their conservation however, as fires rejuvenate populations on average every 15–20 years by killing the surviving adults and triggering the release of the canopy seed bank (in the cones), and germination of the soil seed bank. Seeds remain viable for at least 80 years. Juveniles take 5–7 years to flower and set seed, whereafter the populations are ready to burn again.

== Heraldry ==
"[S]tylized twigs of the silver tree" [sic] appear in the arms of the South Peninsula Municipality of South Africa.

== Pictures ==
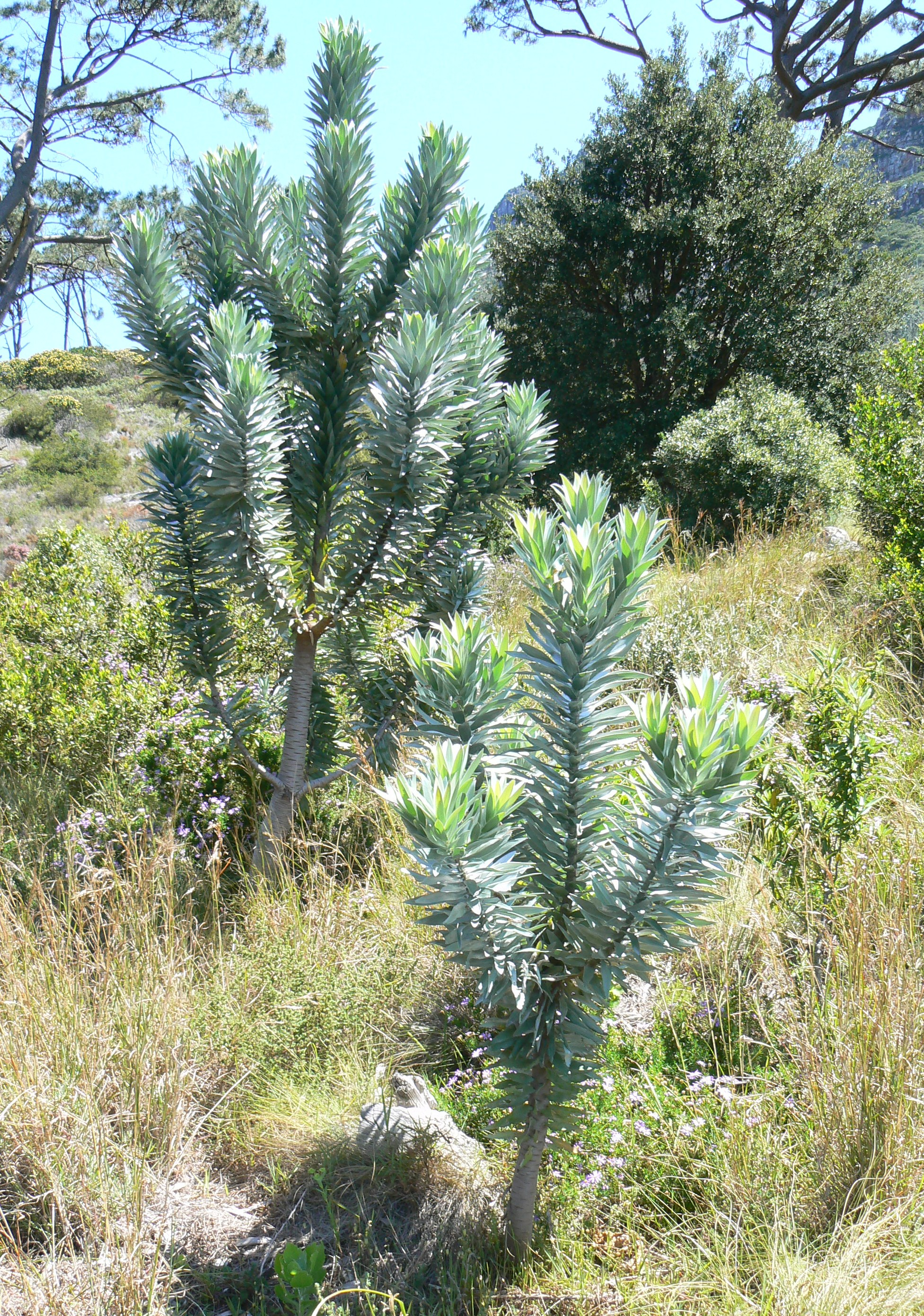
Silvertrees were driven to near extinction when their natural habitat was cleared for commercial pine plantations.

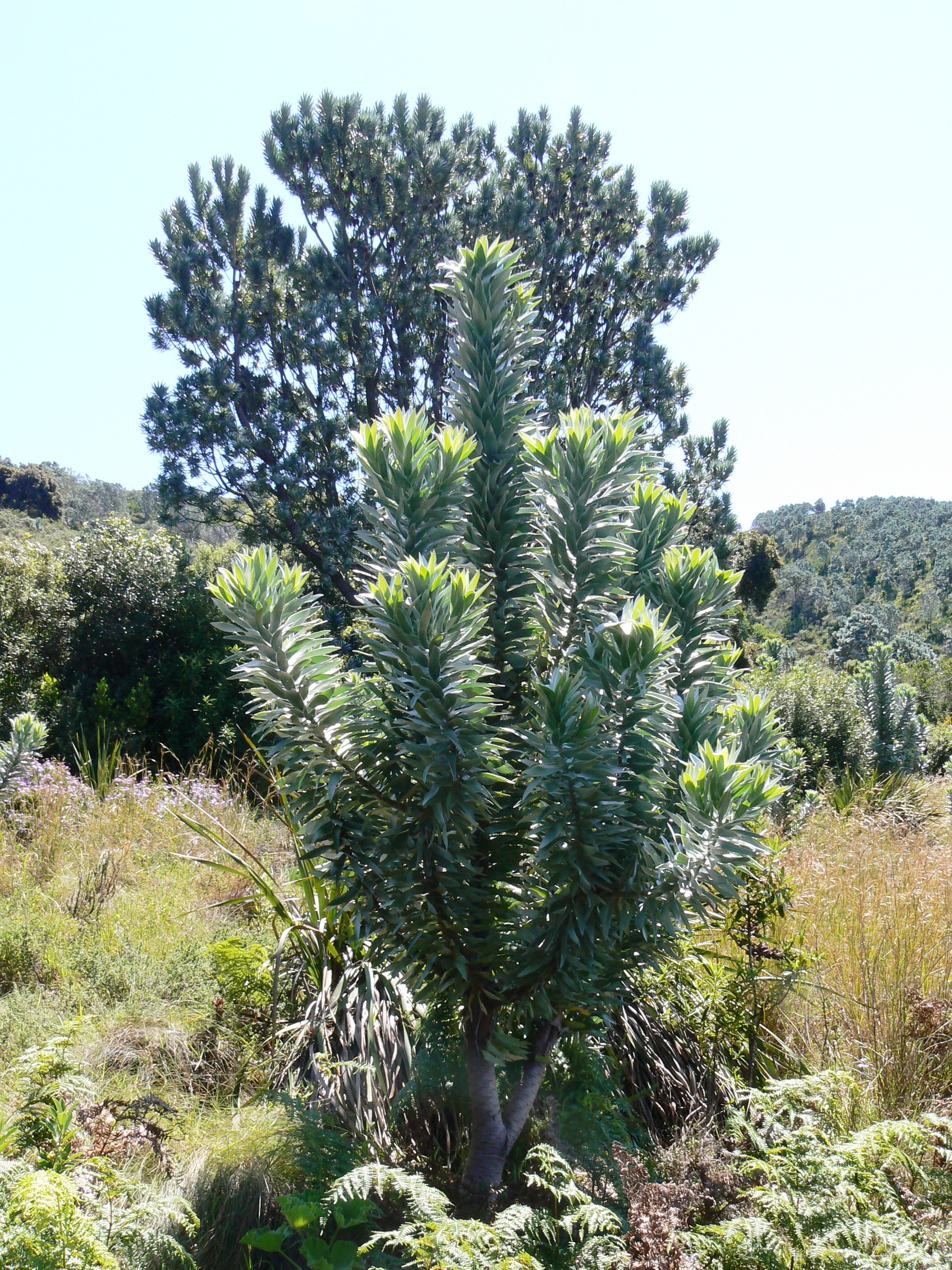
Silvertrees grow only in and around Cape Town, particularly on Table Mountain.

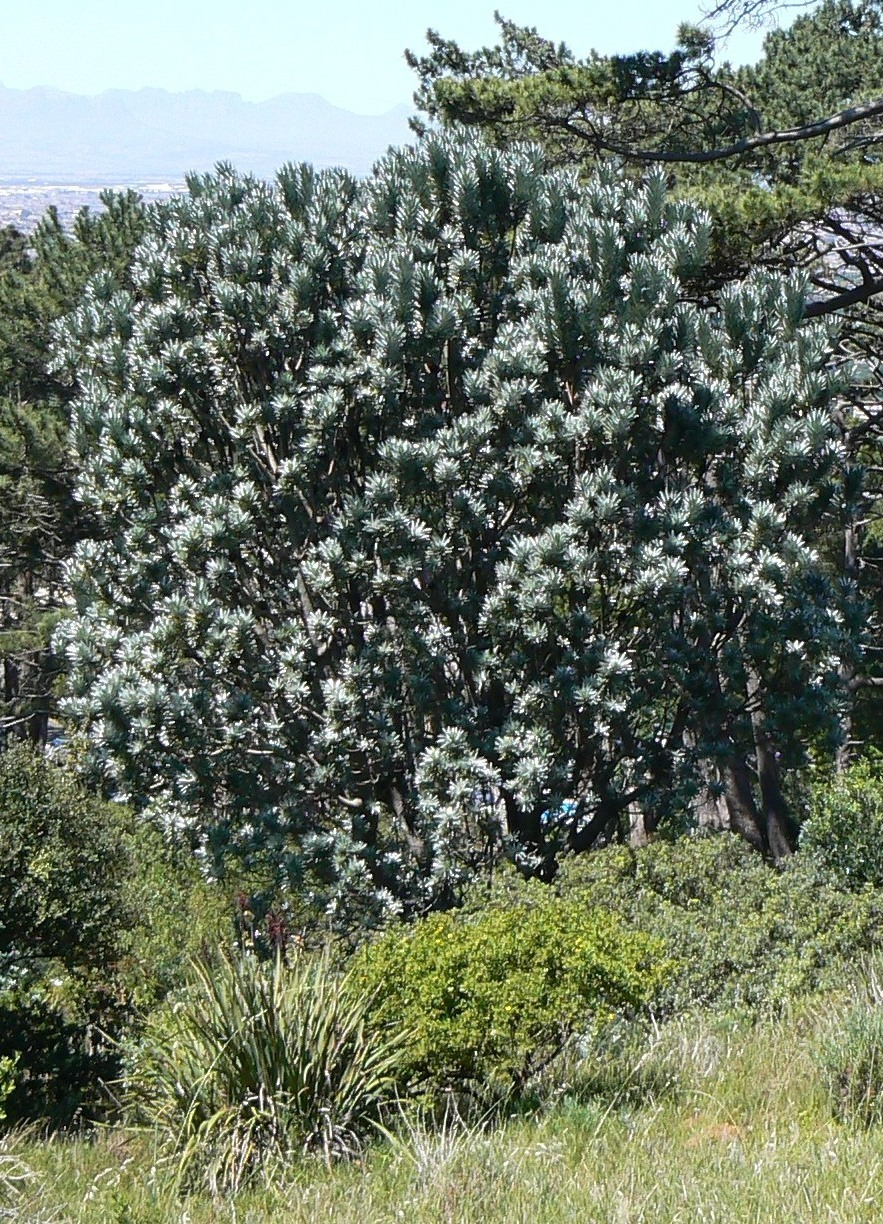
A large silvertree near Rhodes Memorial

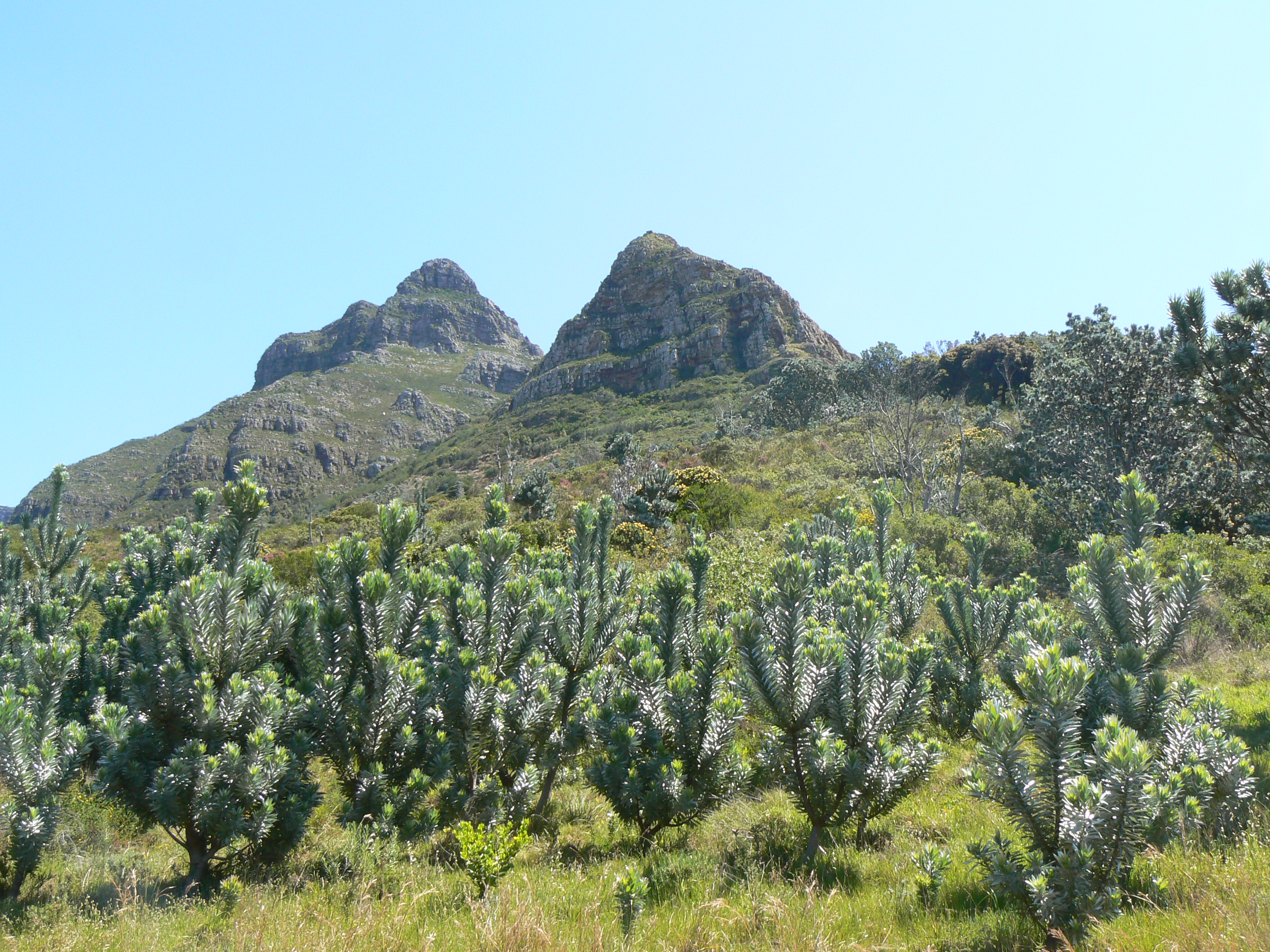
A young stand of silvertrees on Devil's Peak, Table Mountain.

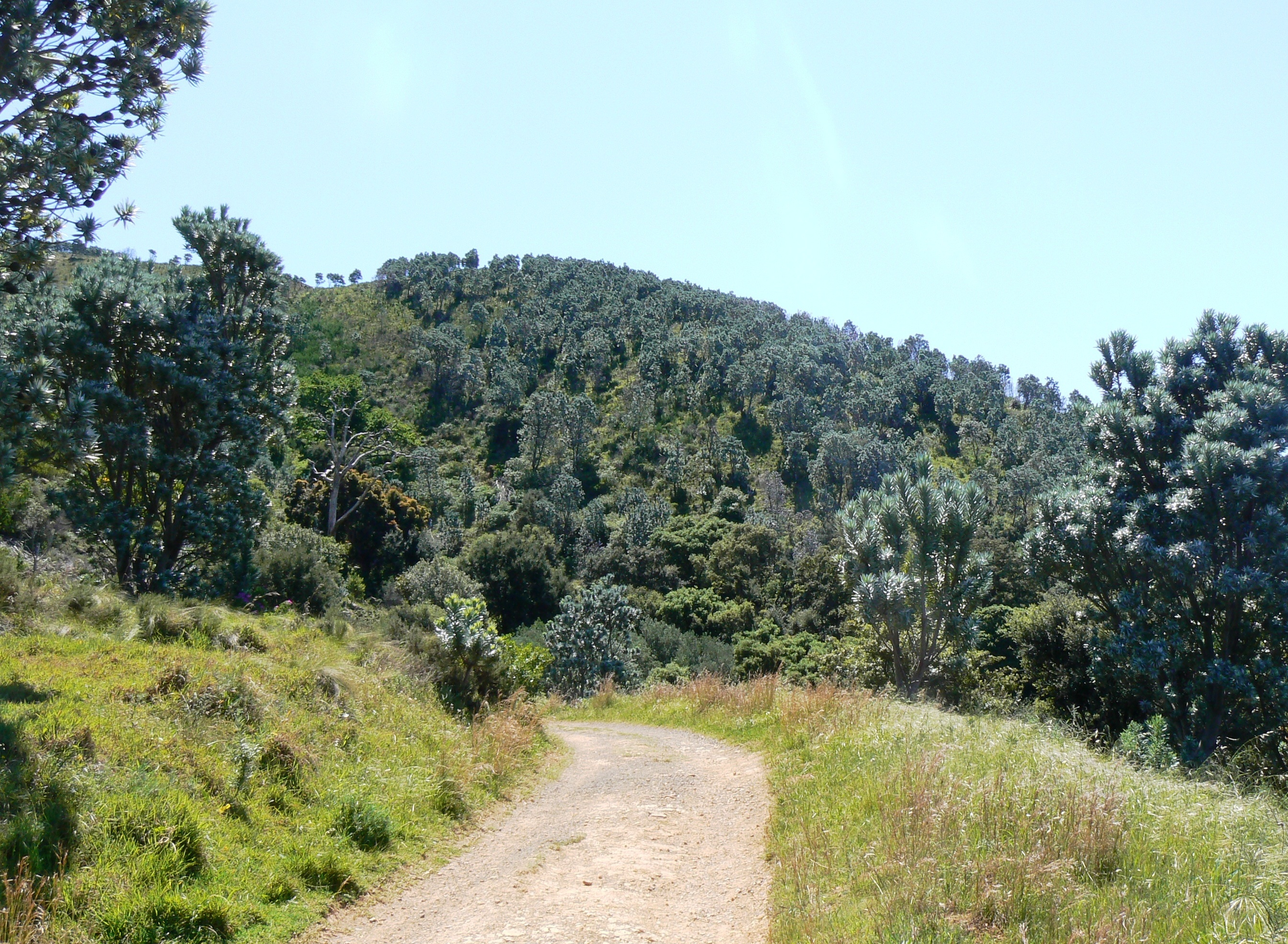
A silvertree forest on the lower slopes of Devil's Peak

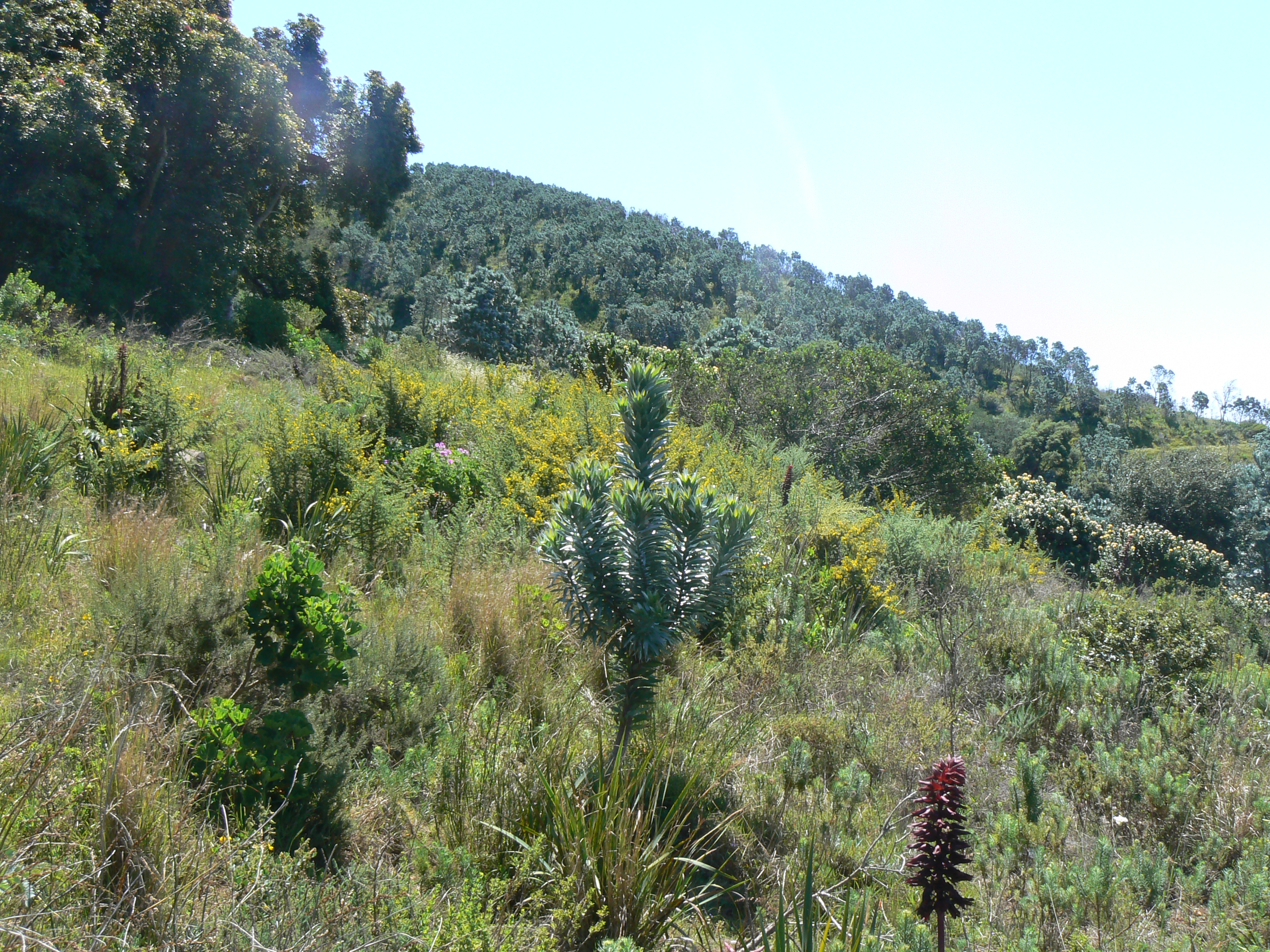
Partial removal of the invasive pine plantations allowed silvertree forests to gradually return.

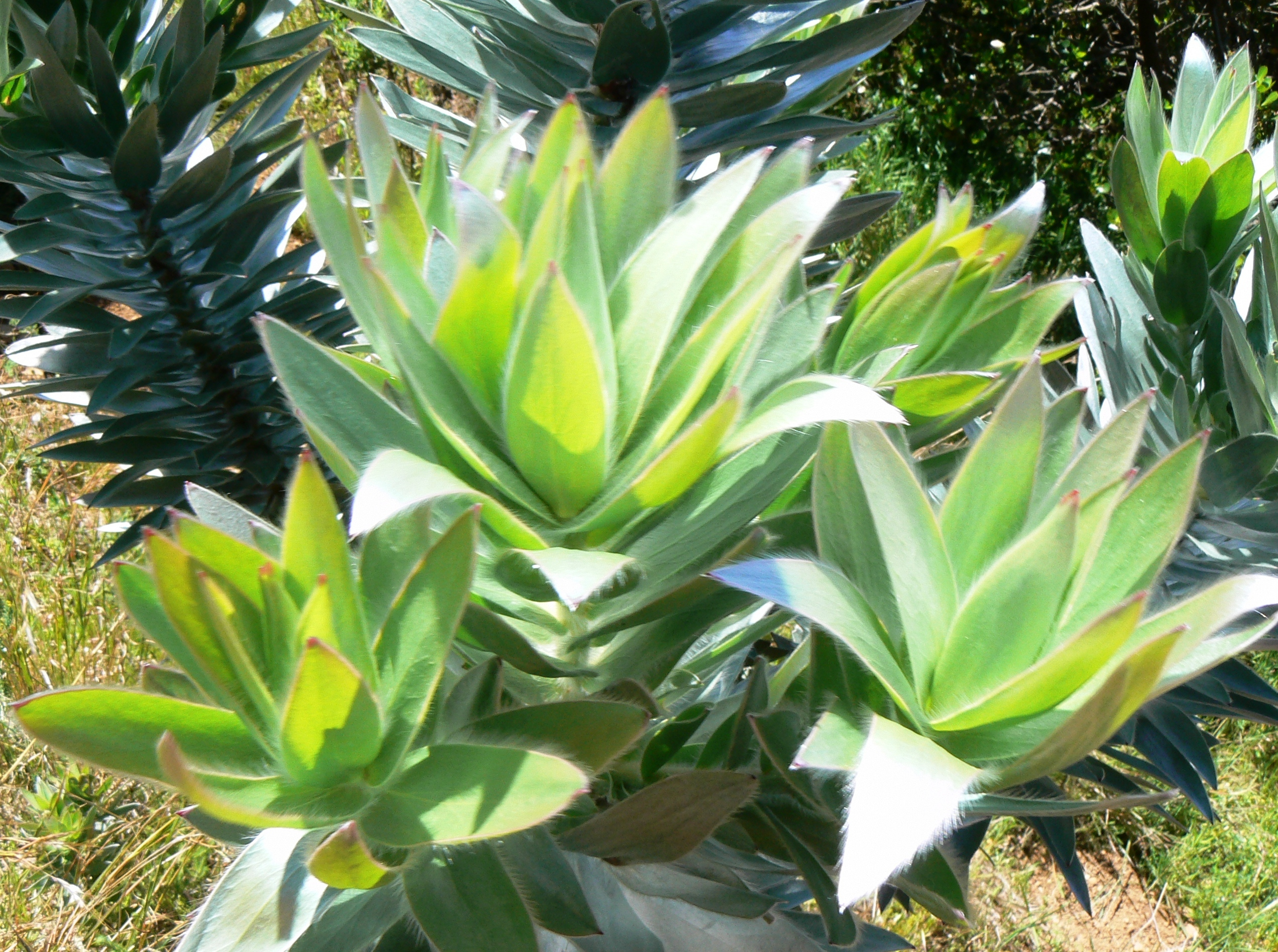
Silver tree leaves are soft and silky.

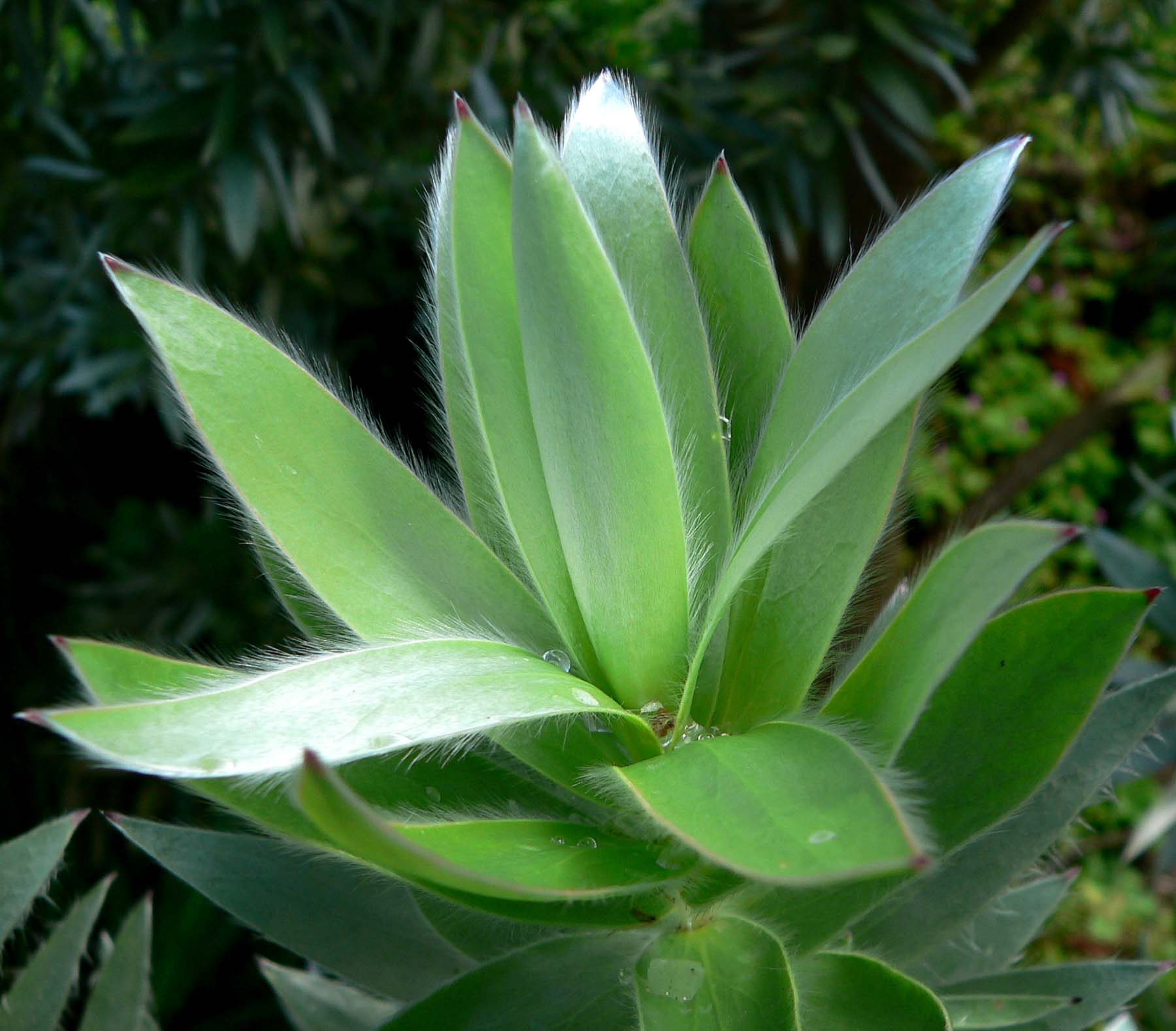
New growth detail

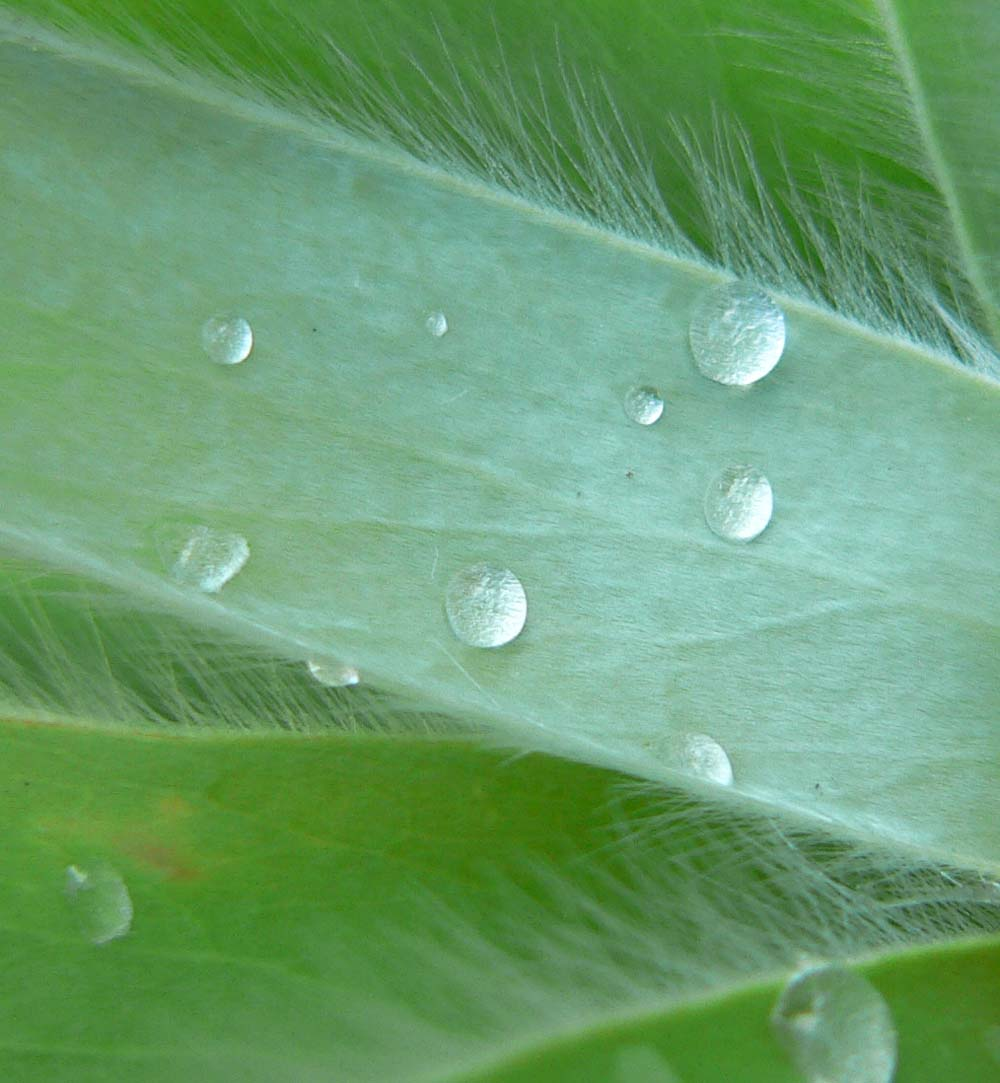
The silver leaf colour is due to their soft velvety hair

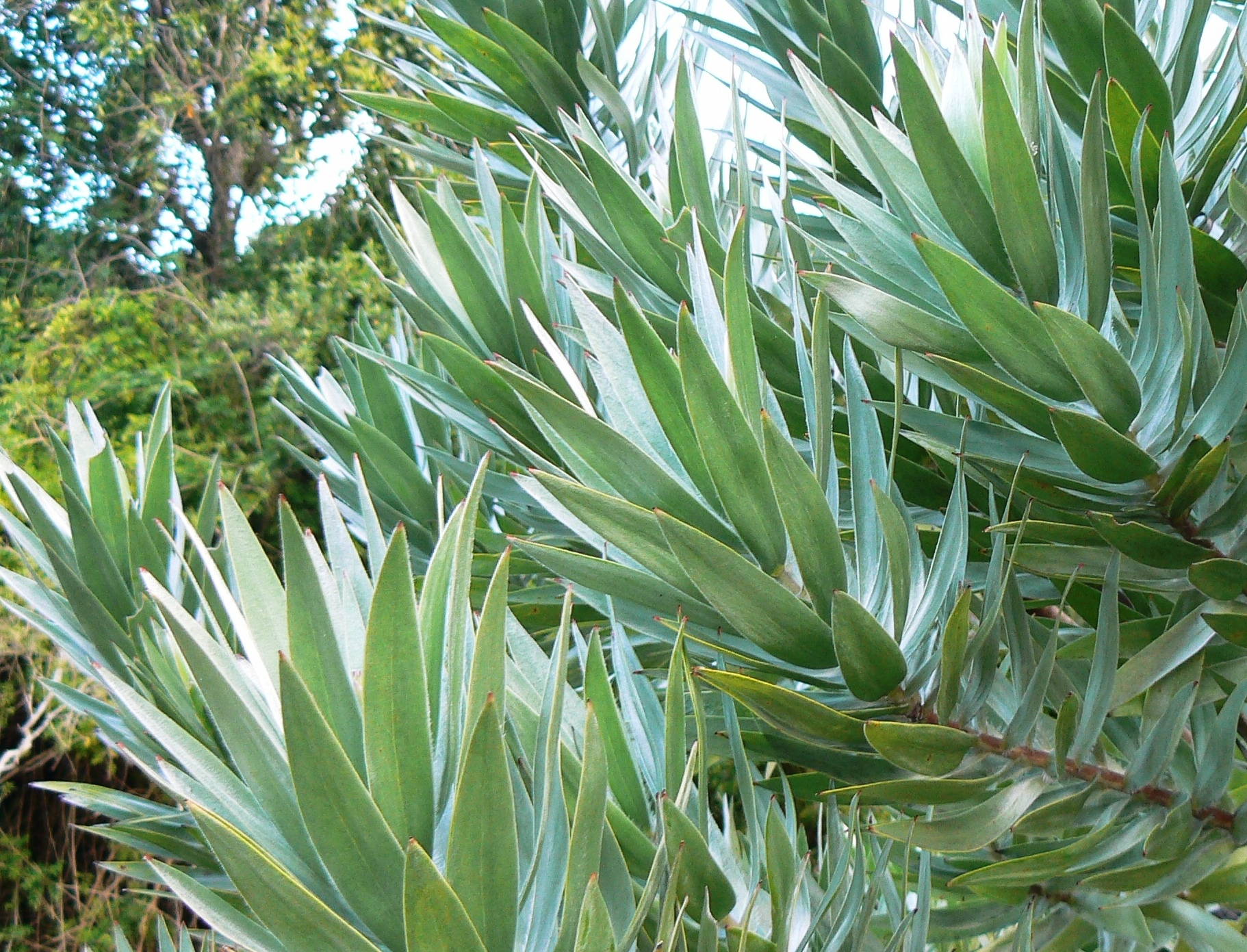

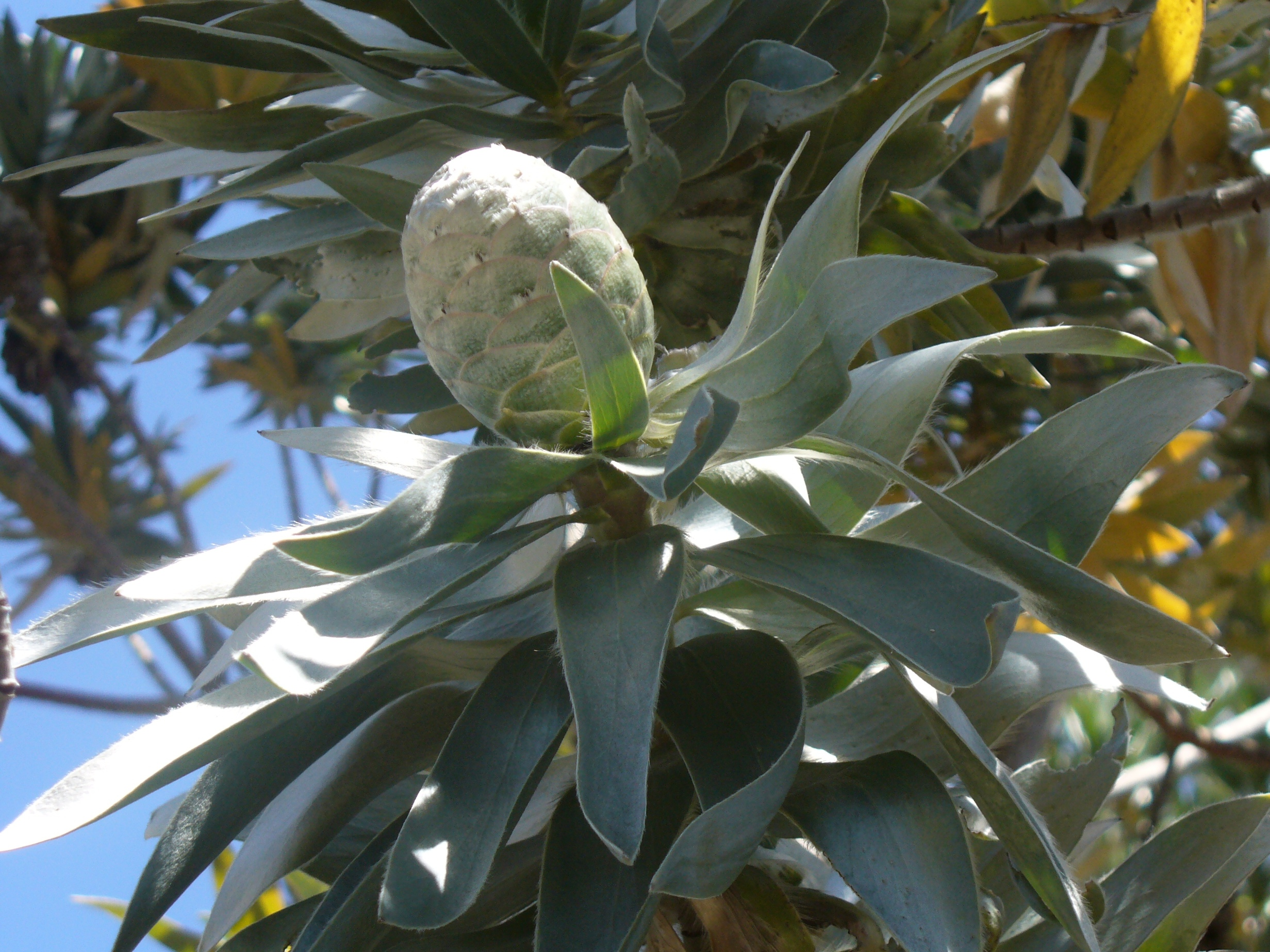
Heavy cone of a female tree, which eventually opens to release the small, round nuts

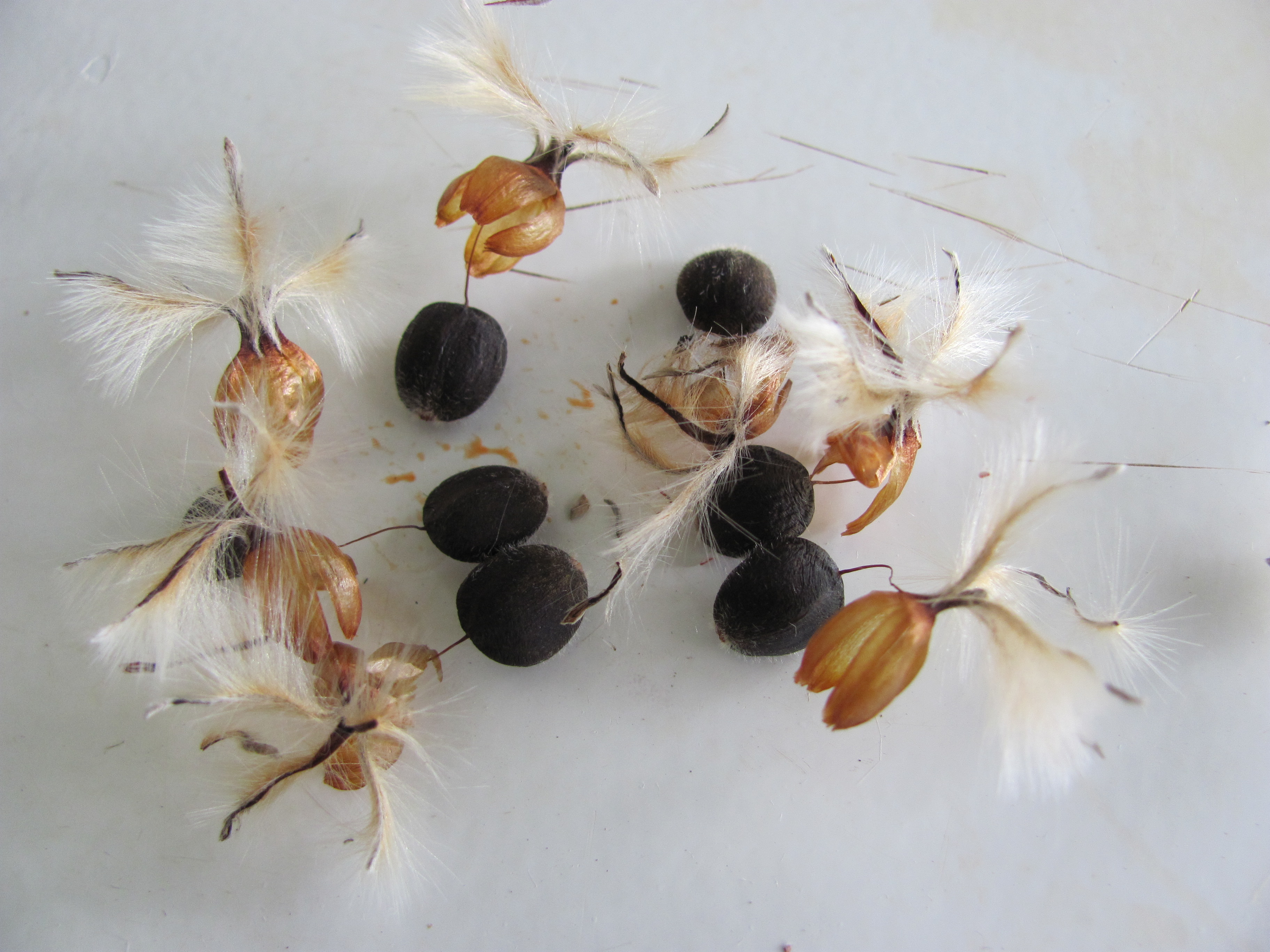
Seeds of the silver tree

== See also ==
- List of Southern African indigenous trees
- Peninsula Granite Fynbos
- Silwerboomkloof
- Rhodes Memorial
- Newlands Forest
