= Rhodes Memorial =

Memorial to Cecil Rhodes in South Africa

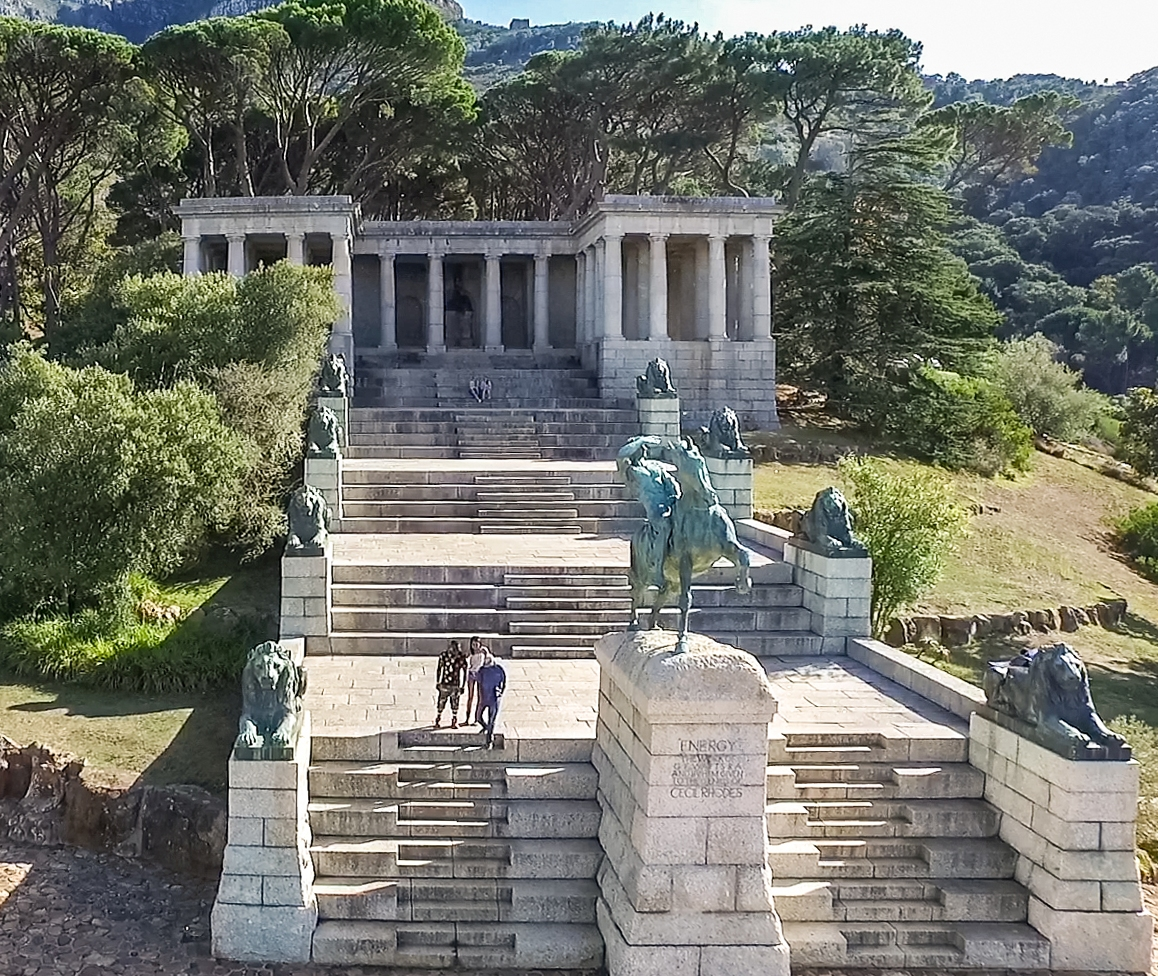
- The memorial sits on Devil's peak nearby the University of Cape Town
- Interactive map of Rhodes Memorial
- Location: Cape Town
- Coordinates: 33°57′08.5″S 18°27′32.7″E
- Designer: Sir Herbert Baker
- Material: Cape granite and bronze
- Completion date: 1912
- Dedicated to: Cecil Rhodes

An aerial video of the Rhodes Memorial in 2015.

The Rhodes Memorial is a large monument in the style of an ancient Greek temple on Devil's Peak in Cape Town, South Africa, situated close to Table Mountain. It is a memorial to the English-born South African politician Cecil John Rhodes (1853 – 1902). Designed by architect Herbert Baker, it was finished in 1912.

Rhodes was a mining magnate, founder of the monopolistic De Beers diamond company, influential politician and later prime minister (1890 to 1896) of the British Cape Colony, today a part of the state of South Africa. He had an important and undisputedly partly questionable role in the British imperial policies towards whole southern Africa at the end of the 19th century, a period of colonialism called the Scramble for Africa. Therefore, the existence of the extensive monument has been subject to controversy in present-day South Africa.

== Location ==
The memorial is located at Rhodes's favourite spot on his former estate on the lower slopes of Devil's Peak. Rhodes's own wooden bench is still situated below the memorial. The view facing north-east can be imagined as the start of the Cape to Cairo Railway and Rhodes's dream of a "red line" of British dominions spanning the continents north to its south.

Rhodes owned vast areas of the lower slopes of adjacent Table Mountain, most of which he gave to the nation on his death. Part of his estate was used for the University of Cape Town upper campus, part is now the Kirstenbosch National Botanical Garden, while much else of it was spared from development.

== Architecture ==
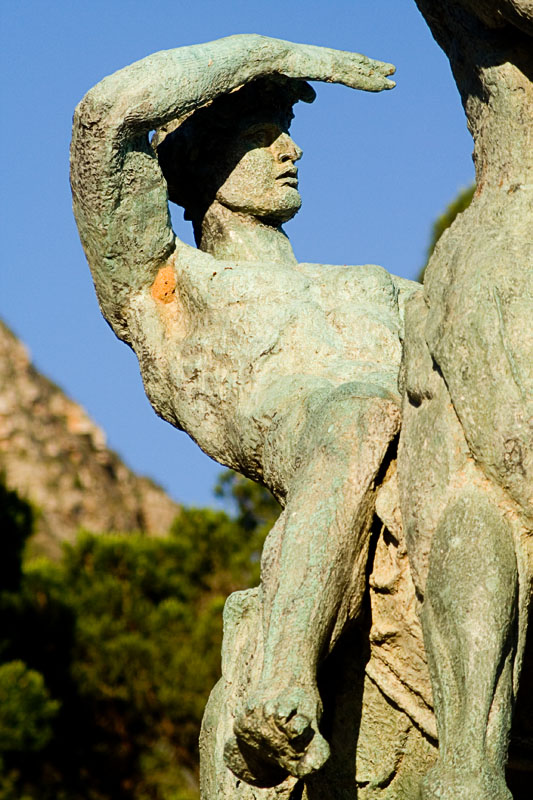
Detail of the bronze statue Physical Energy by George Frederic Watts

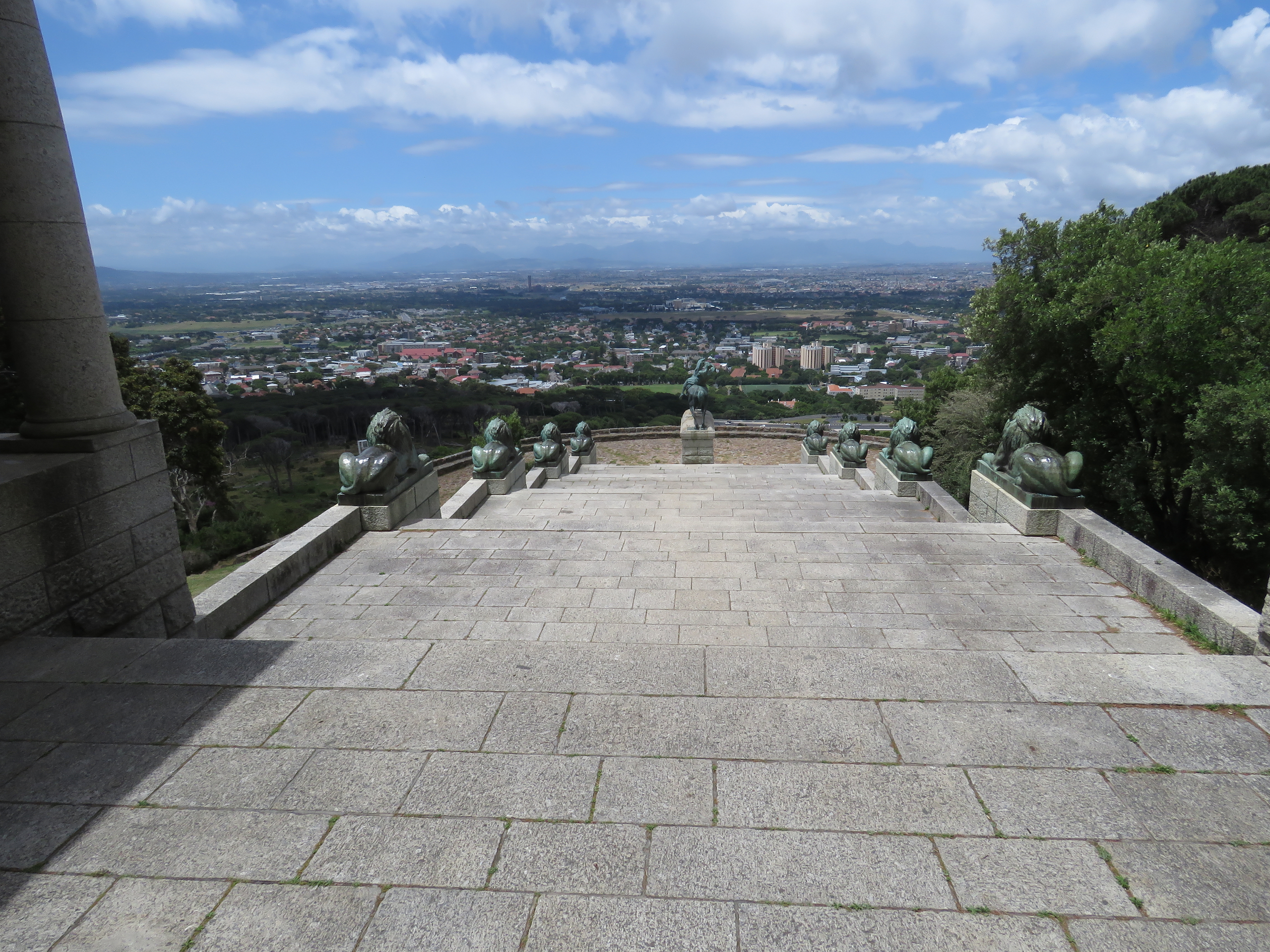
View to the east, past the statuary.

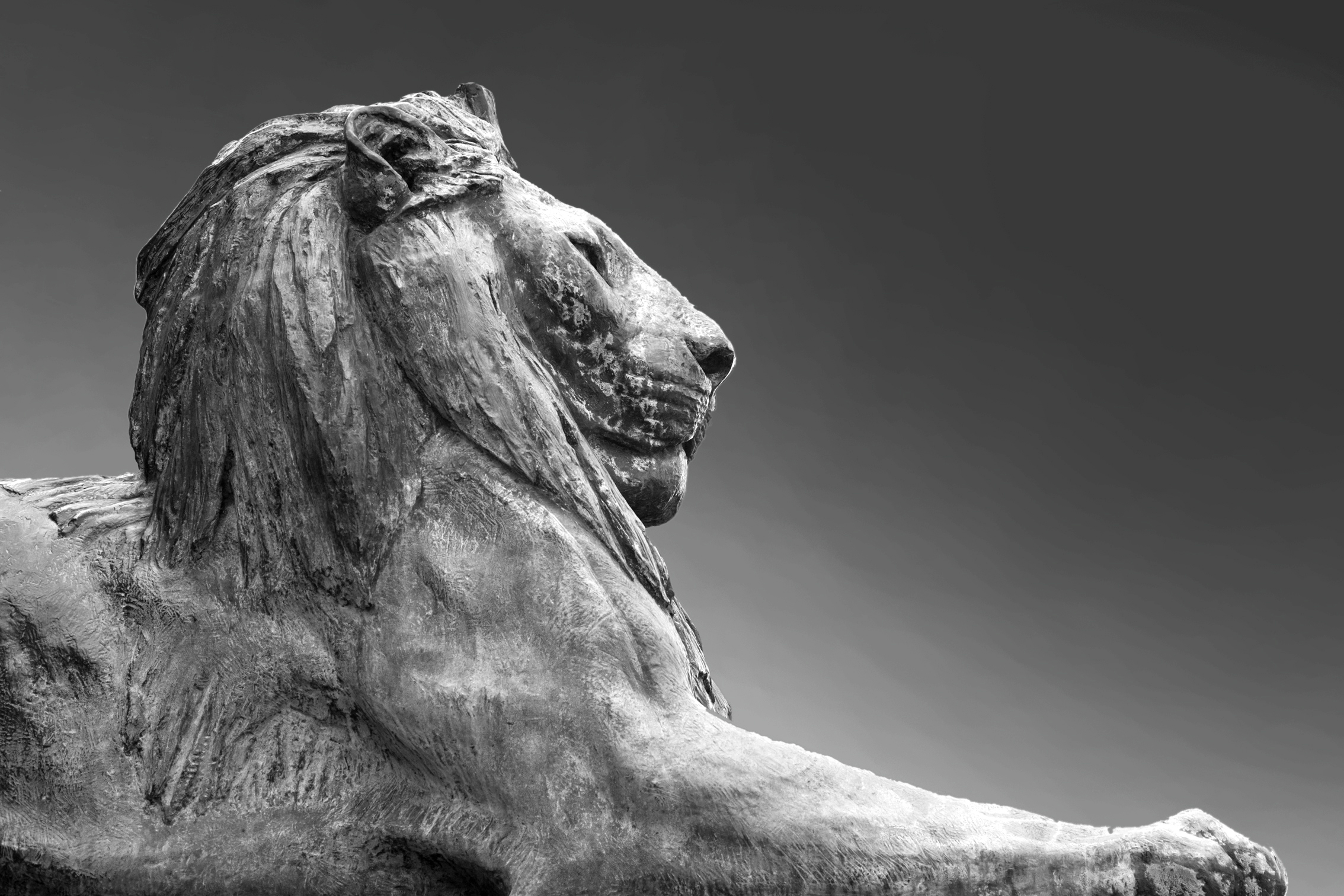
A black and white photograph of one of the eight lions that flank the stairs at Rhodes Memorial.

The architect, Sir Herbert Baker, allegedly modelled the memorial after the Greek temple at Segesta although it is actually closer to the temple of Pergamon in design. It consists of a massive staircase with 49 steps (one for each year of Rhodes's life) leading from a semi-circular terrace up to a rectangular U-shaped monument formed of pillars. The memorial is built of Cape granite quarried on Table Mountain.

At the bottom of the steps is a bronze statue of a horseman, Physical Energy by George Frederic Watts. Eight bronze lions by John Macallan Swan flank the steps leading up to the memorial, with a bust of Rhodes (also by JM Swan). The inscription on the monument is "To the spirit and life work of Cecil John Rhodes who loved and served South Africa." Inscribed below the bust of Rhodes are the last four lines of the last stanza from the 1902 poem Burial by Rudyard Kipling in honour of Rhodes:

The immense and brooding spirit still
Shall quicken and control.
Living he was the land, and dead,
His soul shall be her soul!

The monument was completed and dedicated in 1912. A memorial proposed by the British official (Colonial Secretary) Earl Grey never materialised: a massive statue inspired by the historical antique "colossus of Rhodes" on the island of Rhodes, Greece which was meant to overlook Cape Town from the summit of Lion's Head, similar to the large statue of Christ overlooking Rio de Janeiro.

== Outdoor activities ==
Today the memorial is part of the Table Mountain National Park. There was a well-known tea room behind the memorial, but has unfortunately burned down. It is also a starting point for walking and hiking on Devil's Peak. Around the memorial are groves of oaks and stone pines from Europe, and there are also a few remaining pockets of the original Afromontane forest nearby. Just up the slope from Rhodes Memorial there is a small forest of a famous native tree called the Silvertree. Table Mountain is possibly the only place on earth where this majestic tree grows wild and Rhodes Memorial has one of the last surviving stands.

Alien fallow deer used to live in the area, although they are now being eliminated to make way for the re-introduction of indigenous antelope species. Below the memorial is a game enclosure where eland, zebra and wildebeest are kept.

Rhodes Memorial is not generally used for events but does host occasional performances, an annual Easter sunrise service, and is often used as a location for filming. For safety reasons, the area is closed from sunset to sunrise.

== The area around the memorial ==
Not far below the memorial are the University of Cape Town (UCT), Groote Schuur Hospital and Mostert's Mill. Above the memorial is the King's Blockhouse, and not far away is the Groote Schuur Zoo site, originally established as Rhodes's private zoo. The zoo was closed in the late 1970s, and only the lion's den now remains. Rhodes's Groote Schuur estate nearby is now a South African presidential residence.

A statue of Rhodes was situated on the UCT campus, on the lower part of Sarah Baartman Hall steps overlooking the university's rugby fields. This statue had become the focus of protests in March 2015 calling for its removal. It has now been permanently removed.

The area around the memorial was affected by the Table Mountain fire in 2021, and the visitors' cafe was burnt down.

== Controversy of the memorial ==
The Rhodes Memorial remains a controversial site in post-Apartheid South Africa due to the historical political impact Cecil Rhodes had in the formation of an unequal system.

Some are of the opinion that colonialism and apartheid are part of the history of South Africa and that the Rhodes Memorial therefore is appropriate. Another view on the matter is that, due to the impact the colonialism has had on forming the inequal society that is South Africa today, this kind of memorial is inappropriate. There are also several other movements ongoing that are addressing issues on this topic, like discussions about monuments and statues in the UK and Europe that promoted colonialism and imperialism, and the Black Lives Matter movement.

Another point of view in this debate accepts the problematic signal that this kind of monument holds but argues that keeping them in the public light is preferable so that they can be critically interrogated on a regular basis.

The controversy around Cecil Rhodes monuments was addressed by the Rhodes Must Fall movement, a series of student protests, that eventually lead to the removal of the statue of Cecil Rhodes at the University of Cape Town campus. Many of the same arguments are brought up in the discussion of the memorial, as well as for other monuments and statues of Rhodes in Southern Africa. They argued that letting such memorials stay in the public space gives significance to, and continues the promotion of, the ideas that Rhodes himself promoted, like the elitism of the white population and the economical and geographical distribution and ownership. The students of South Africa, through the Rhodes Must Fall movement, expressed how they did not accept the insensitivities that this kind of monument gives presence to.

=== Vandalism ===
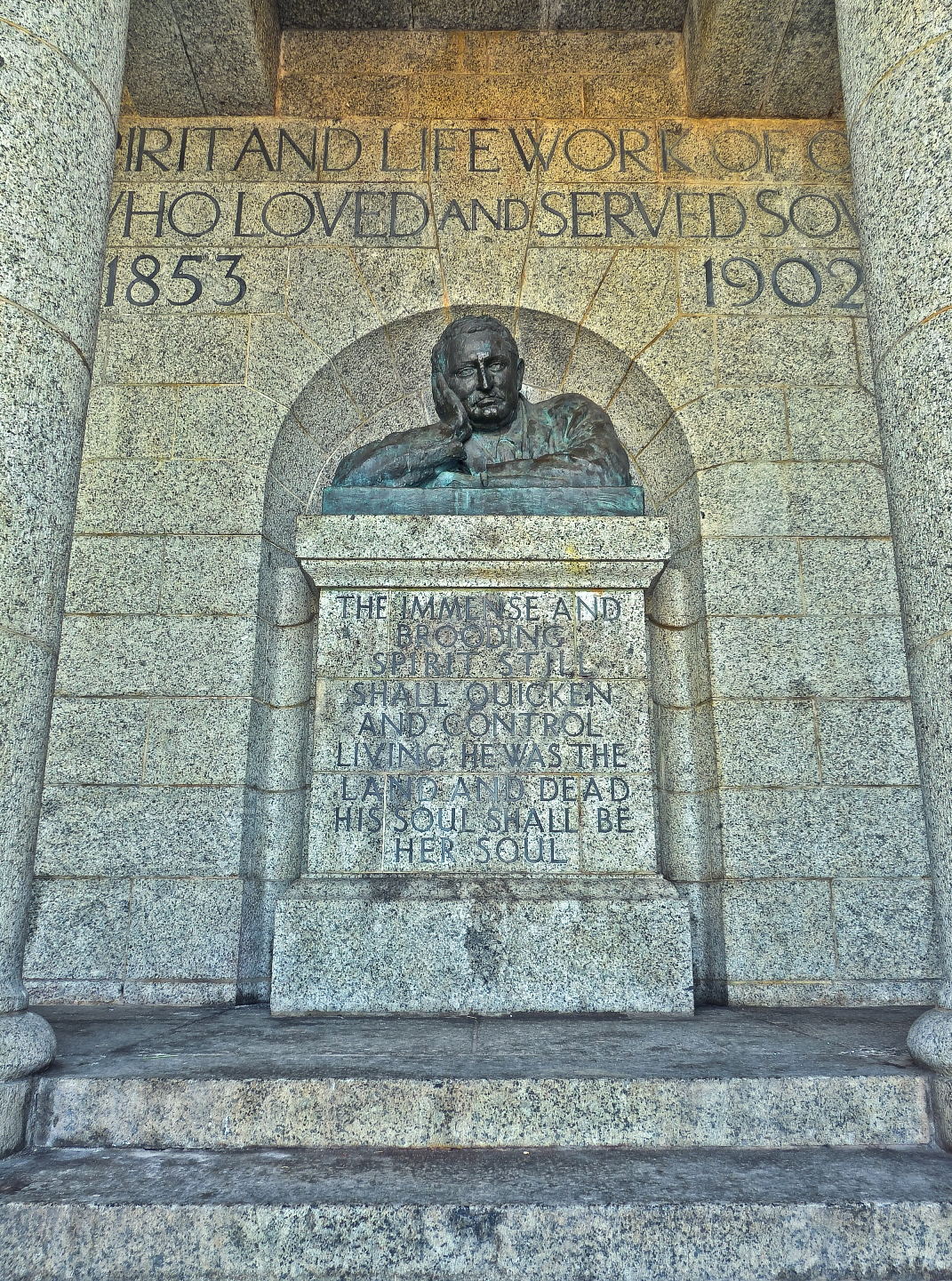
The bronze bust of Cecil John Rhodes at Rhodes Memorial before it was vandalised.

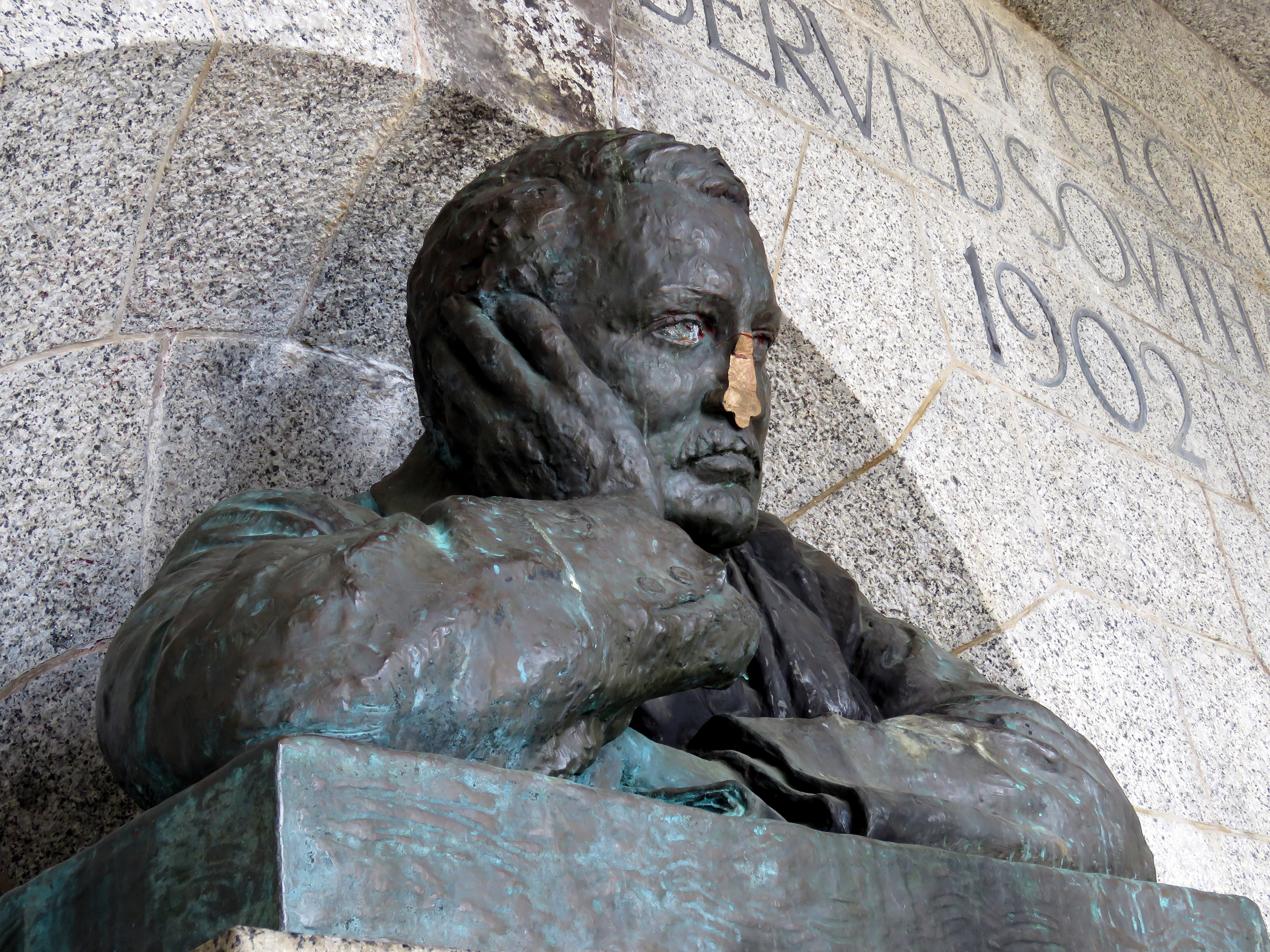
The defaced bust in 2015 - note the missing nose.

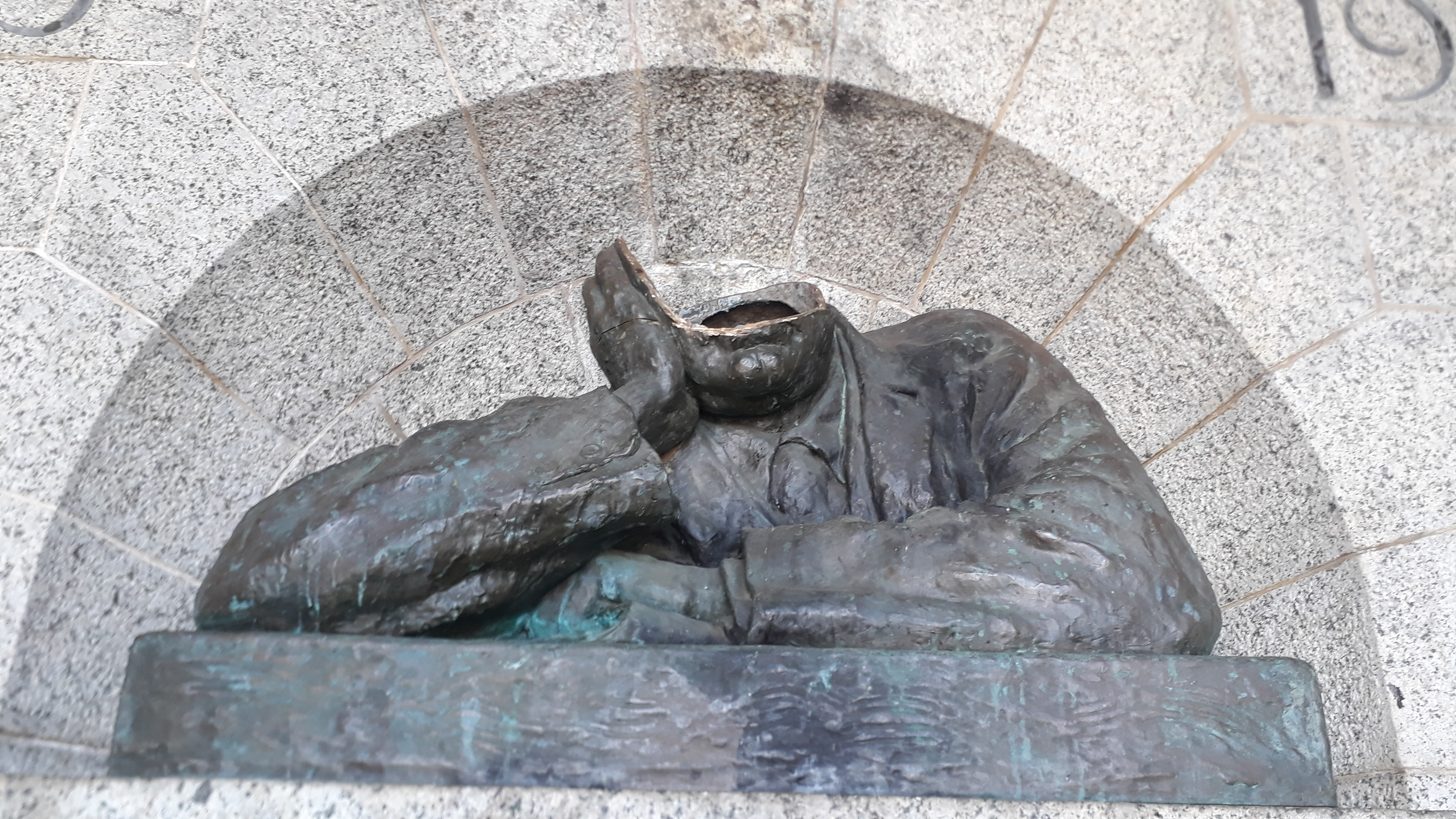
The decapitated bust in July 2020.

In September 2015, the bronze bust of Rhodes at the memorial was vandalised. The nose was cut off and the memorial was daubed with graffiti accusing Rhodes of being a "Racist, thief, [and] murderer." It appeared that the vandals had attempted to cut off the whole head. The nose was later restored by a local artist and historian. In July 2020, the bust was decapitated. The head was recovered nearby and reattached on Heritage Day later that year. The vandalism on the memorial in 2015 and 2020 is thought to be a result of the controversy and protests against legacies of colonialism and imperialism.
