= Cape Town fire =

Cape Town fire may refer to:

- Table Mountain fire (2000)
- Table Mountain fire (2006)
- Table Mountain fire (2009)
- 2015 Western Cape fire season
- 2021 Table Mountain fire
