= Table Mountain fire =

Table Mountain fire may refer to:

- 2000 Table Mountain fire
- 2006 Table Mountain fire
- 2009 Table Mountain fire
- 2015 Table Mountain fire
- 2021 Table Mountain fire
- 2025 Table Mountain fire
