= 2021 Table Mountain fire =

Cape Town fire that destroyed historic mill and library collections

2021 Cape Town fire
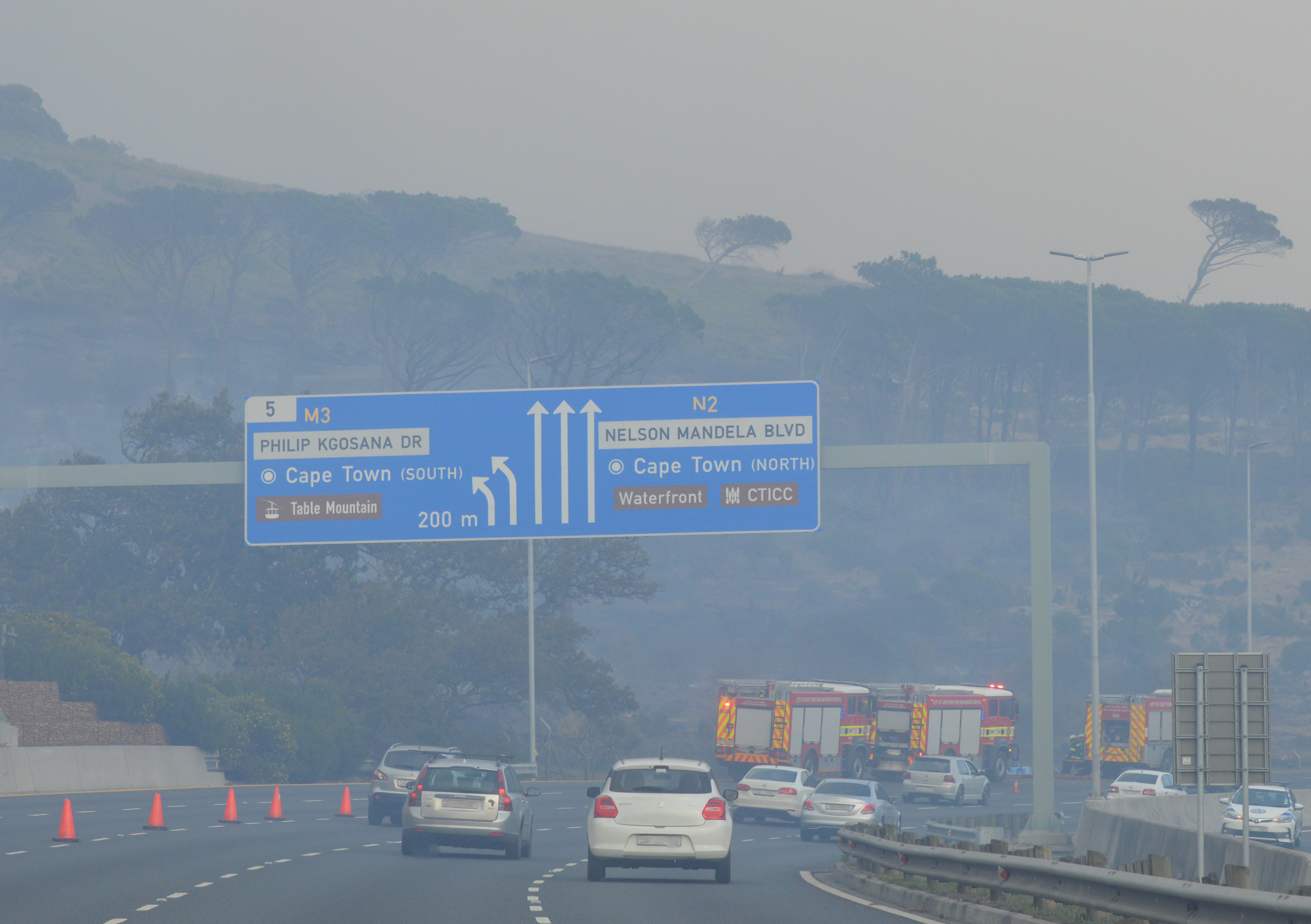
- Fire trucks on the Hospital Bend interchange going into the City Bowl on 19 April
- Date: 18 April 2021; 5 years ago; 08:45 SAST (06:45 UTC)
- Location: Table Mountain National Park and Southern Suburbs, Cape Town, South Africa

Statistics
- Burned area: at least 400 hectares (4.0 km^{2}; 1.5 mi^{2})
- Land use: National park, university, suburban area

Impacts
- Injuries: 5

The 2021 Table Mountain fire (also known as the Rhodes Memorial fire or Cape Town fire) was a major fire that started on 18 April 2021 in and around Table Mountain National Park and the neighbourhoods of Newlands, Rosebank, Mowbray and Rondebosch in Cape Town, South Africa. The damage to sites in the Table Mountain area included the Rhodes Memorial, where a restaurant burned down; the upper campus of the University of Cape Town (UCT), where the Special Collections library was gutted; and Mostert's Mill, a historic windmill that burned down. In addition, five firefighters were hospitalised.

== Fire and response ==
The wildfire started on the morning of 18 April 2021 near Rhodes Memorial, Devil's Peak in Table Mountain National Park. Firefighters were alerted at 08:45 SAST (06:45 UTC). The fire was reported to have been started by a vagrant, and spread through old pine trees and debris, generating its own wind, towards the university campus and city. There was an extreme fire danger alert on the same day, with high temperature and low humidity.

Initially, the resulting smoke and wind updrafts caused by the fire prevented aerial firefighting support from being deployed. Later, over 250 firefighters were involved in fighting the fire and four helicopters were used to drop water onto the fire.

By 14:10 SAST, students at the University of Cape Town were evacuated. Official warnings were issued for hikers in the Newlands Forest area of Table Mountain National Park to also evacuate. At 16:05 SAST, South African National Parks (SANParks) announced that the restaurant at Rhodes Memorial had been destroyed in the fire. The M3 road was also closed, with the fire spreading to the other side of it.

On 19 April 2021 (8:00 SAST) homes in the Vredehoek, Walmer Estate and University Estate area of Cape Town were evacuated as a precautionary measure. This included the evacuation of the Disa Park residential complex.

By 15:00 SAST on 19 April, firefighters reported that the fire had been "largely contained".

== Casualties and damage ==
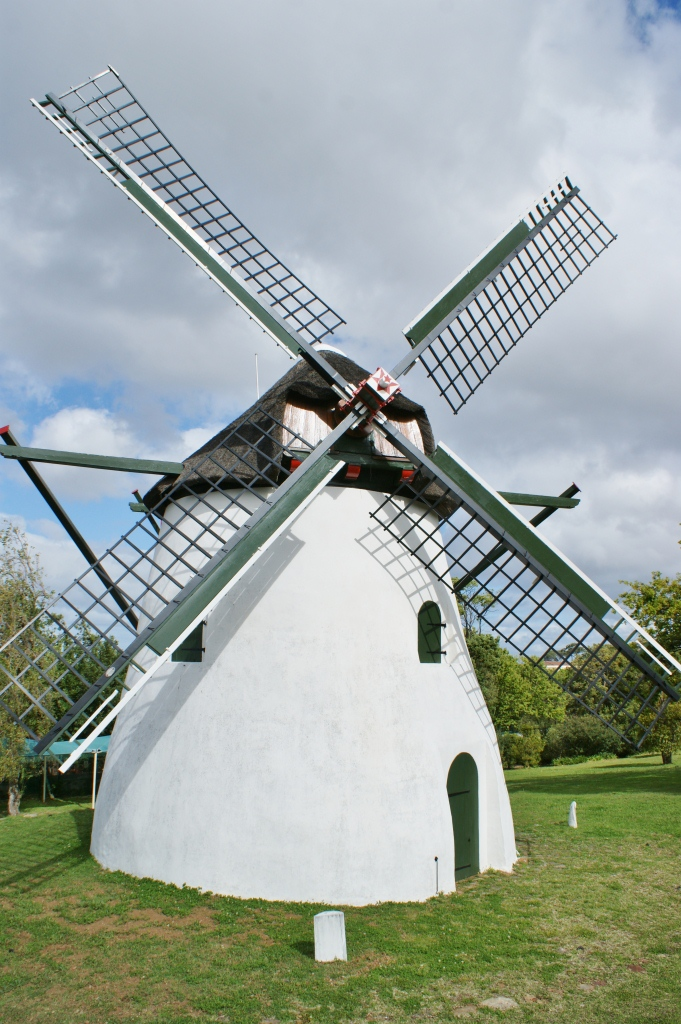
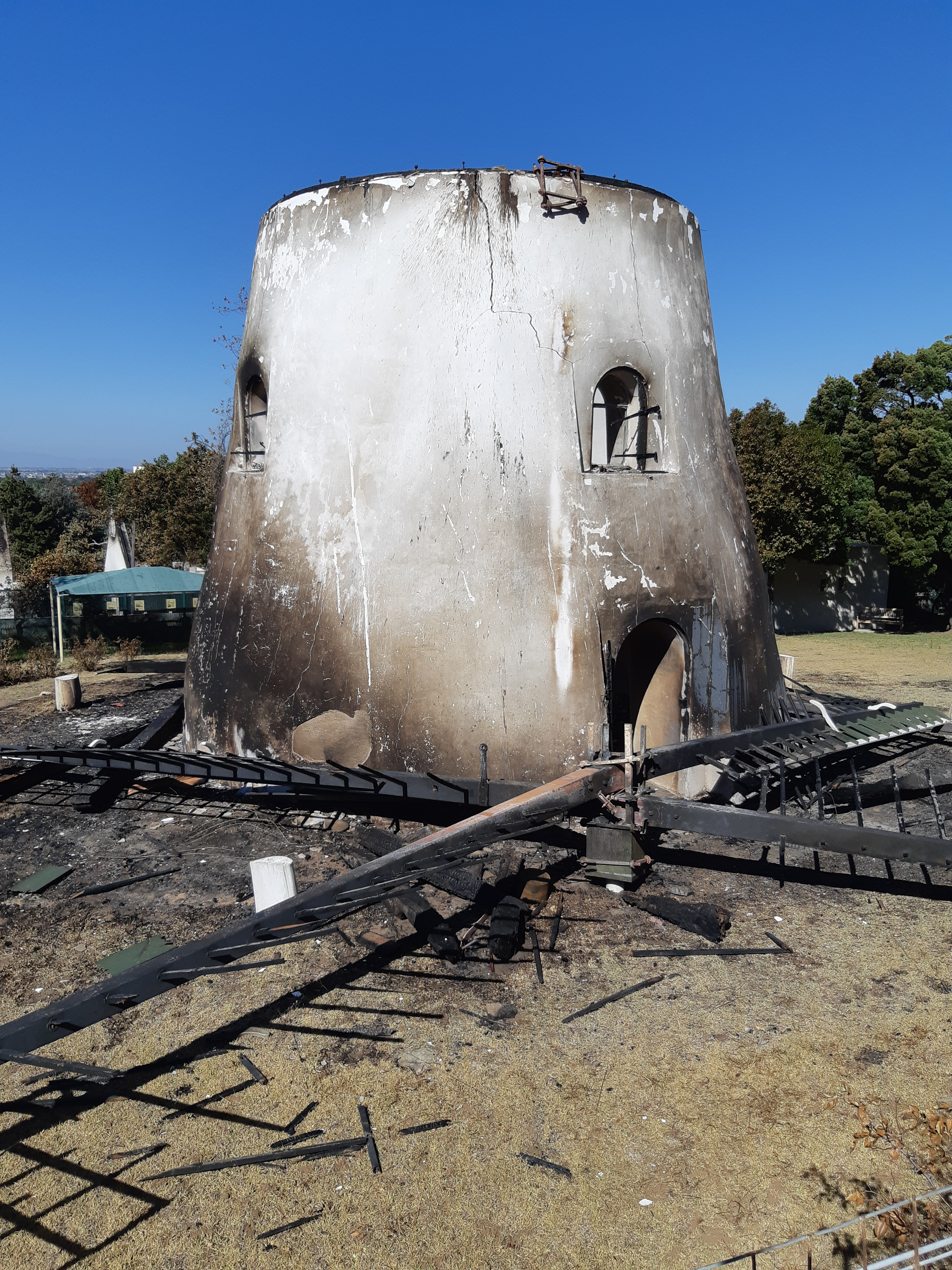
Mostert's Mill in 2012 and on 20 April 2021

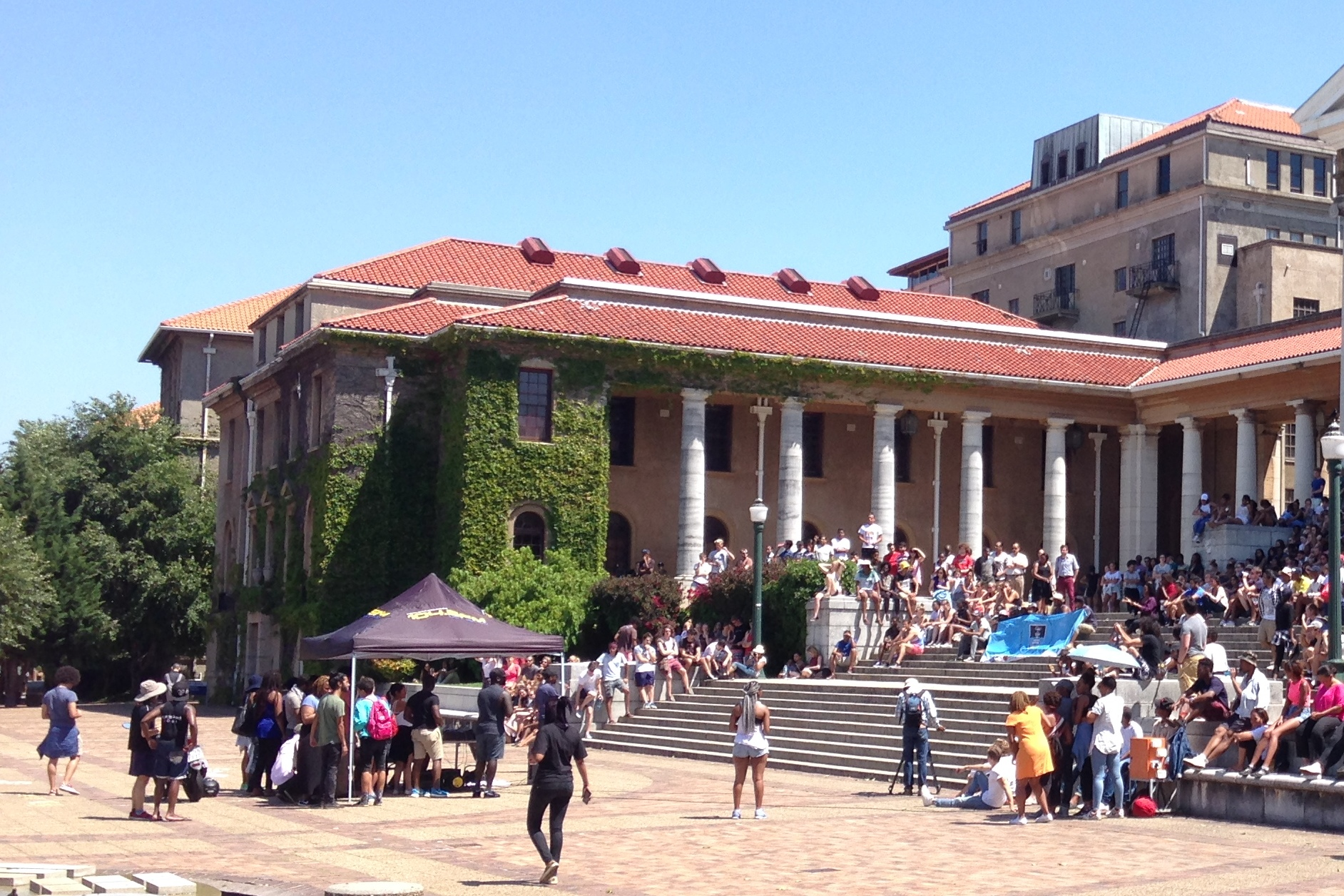
Jagger Library (which houses UCT's Special Collections) in 2015

=== Firefighters ===
On 19 April Western Cape Premier Alan Winde stated that a total of five firefighters were hospitalised. At least four of them were hospitalised due to burn injuries.

=== Rhodes Memorial ===
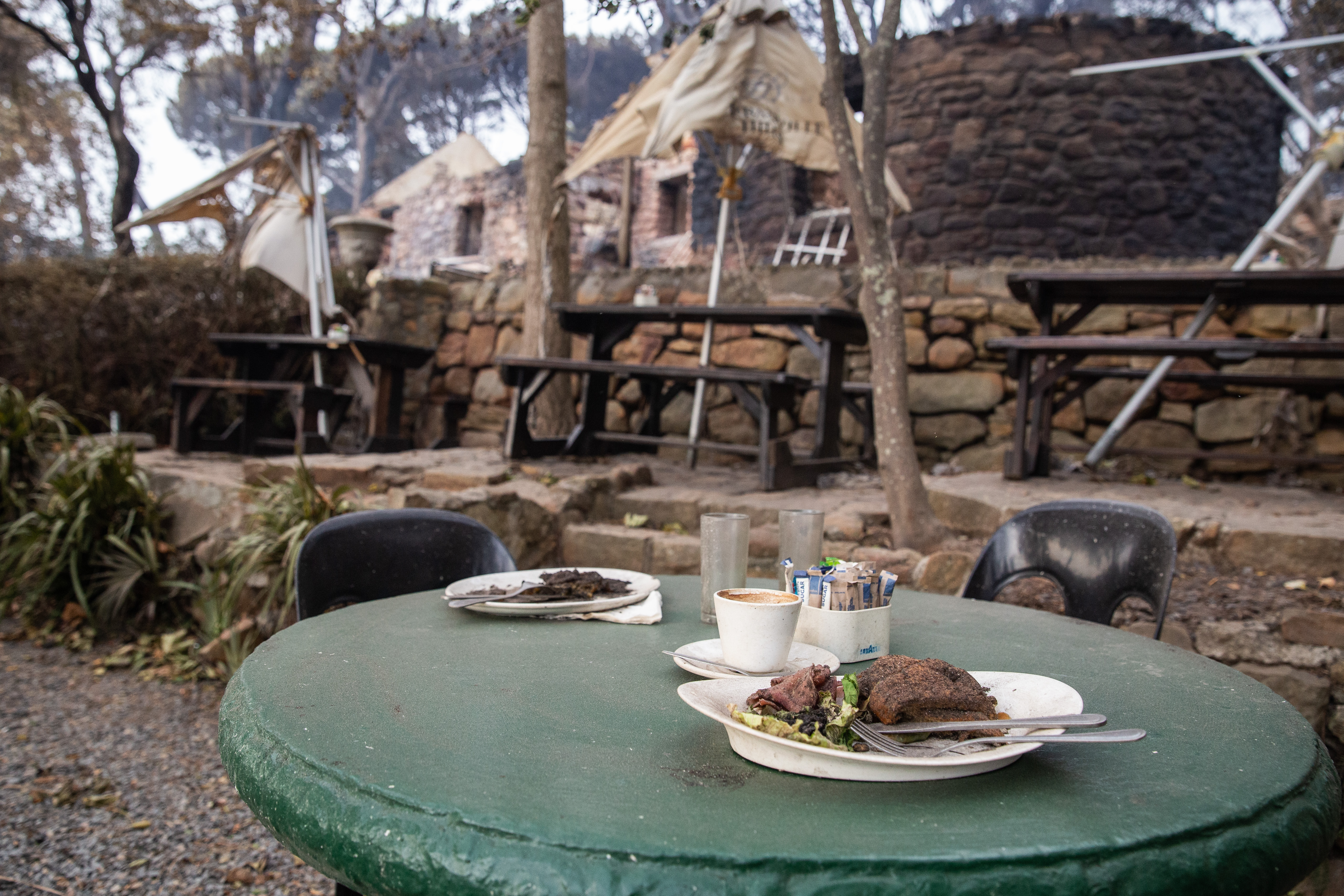
Food left behind at the Rhodes Memorial restaurant after it was evacuated

The fire burnt down a restaurant at the Rhodes Memorial and its adjoining chapel.

External images
- Remains of Jagger Reading Room
- Remains of Cadboll House
- The roof of the HW Pearson building burned.

=== University of Cape Town ===
More than six structures at the campus of the University of Cape Town suffered damage. Also affected was the special collections department of the UCT Libraries system, housed in Jagger Library, part of the research wing of UCT's main library. Although a fire detection system prevented the fire from reaching the rest of the main library, the reading room of Jagger Library was gutted by the flames, and some of the rare collections in the special collections department, which held over 1,300 collections and over 85,000 books and other items, were likely lost. A later assessment found that a vast majority of the African Studies Published Print Collection (about 70,000 items) and the entirety of the African Studies Film Collection DVDs (about 3,500 items) had been destroyed, along with documents relating to the university itself as well as any manuscripts or archives being kept in the Reading Room for digitization or after being digitized, but that the rare and antique collections kept underground, including significant documentation and works of the San and Khoi people who lived in the area in the 1870s, had been preserved.

The H.W. Pearson building caught on fire, although the Bolus Herbarium housed within narrowly escaped destruction and water damage. One of the damaged sections was the Plant Conservation Unit, which studies fossil pollen and compared historical photos of sites with the sites in the present day. Their photos are thought to have been digitized, and the sediment cores they were taken from were housed in a different area, but the fossil pollen lab itself was likely destroyed.

The fire also caused substantial damage to Cadbol House and La Grotta (administrative buildings) and to the Upper Campus student residences Smuts Hall and Fuller Hall. A number of other buildings suffered minor damage.

=== Mostert's Mill ===
The fire also destroyed the Mostert's Mill, the oldest working windmill in South Africa, built in 1796, and four thatched cottages behind it.

=== Newlands ===
The government reported that an unoccupied ministerial residence owned by the Department of Public Works and used by Labour Minister Thulas Nxesi had been “completely destroyed”.

== Aftermath ==
All academic activities at UCT were suspended for a week following the fire, with some student residences closed and students unable to return to their residences. Most students were able to return to Smuts and Fuller Halls on 7 May. As of 2023, a substantial programme is still ongoing to rescue and restore items damaged in the Jagger Library, and to restore the library itself.

Mostert's Mill was repaired by the Friends of Mostert's Mill, a non-profit organisation; by March 2023, it was reported that the mill had been almost completely restored. The Rhodes Memorial restaurant remained closed two years after the fire.

=== Investigation ===
On 18 April at 20:10 SAST, a 35-year-old man was arrested on suspicion of starting the blaze but later released due to a lack of evidence. An investigation into the cause of the fire by South African National Parks concluded that the fire was most likely started by arsonists in throwing a fire starting object out of a vehicle.

== See also ==
- Table Mountain fire (2000)
- Table Mountain fire (2006)
- Table Mountain fire (2009)
- 2015 Western Cape fire season
