= Jagger Library =

Library in Cape Town, South Africa

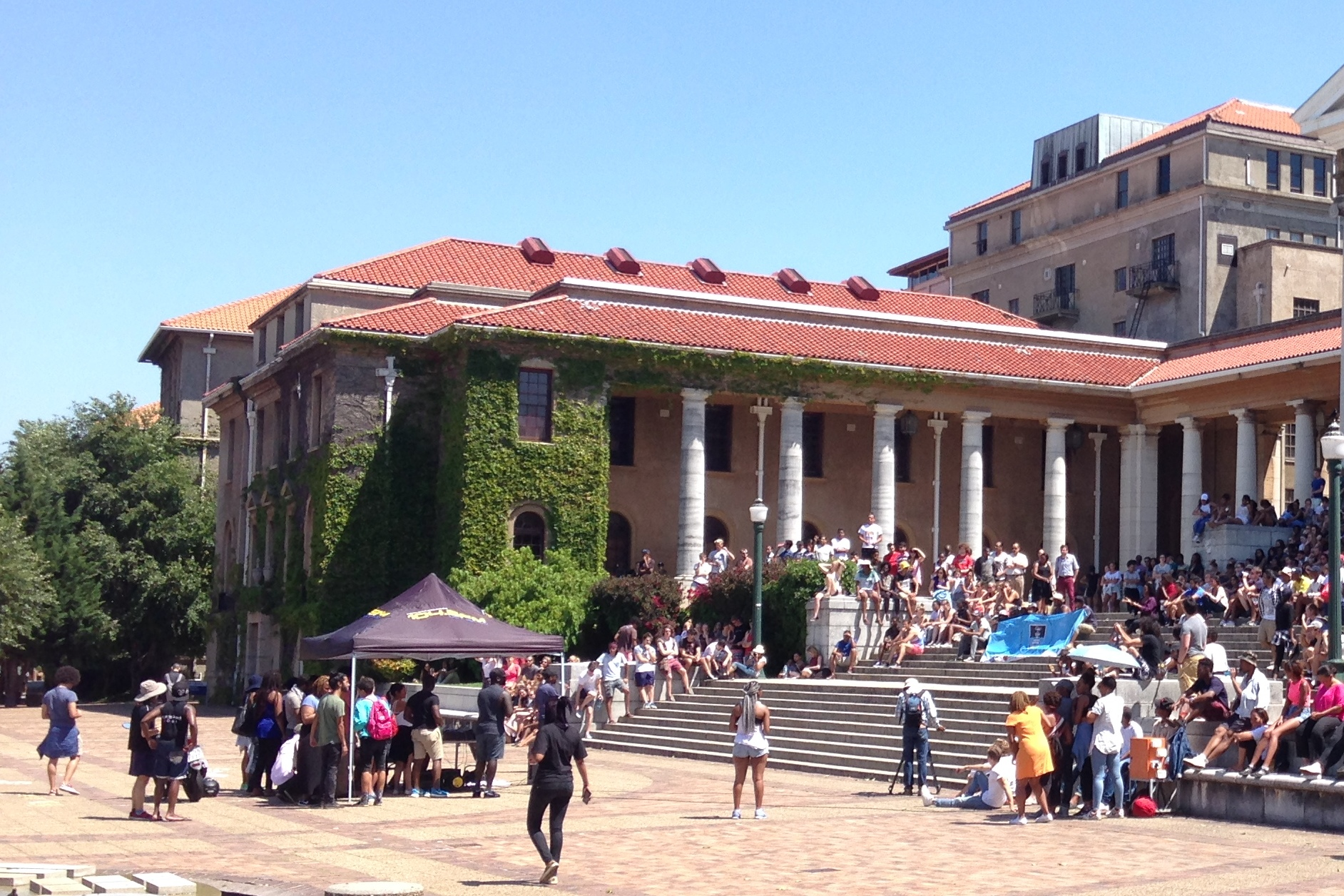
- The library as it appeared during a protest in 2015
- 33°57′29″S 18°27′39″E
- Location: Cape Town, South Africa
- Type: University library

Other information
- Website: www.specialcollections.uct.ac.za/jagger-reading-room

The Jagger Library (also known as the Jagger Reading Room, previously known as the J. W. Jagger Linear Library) was the main reading room of the University of Cape Town Libraries.

The building was constructed in the 1930s, named after John William Jagger, a major benefactor of the University of Cape Town Libraries. It served initially as the main library, then as a temporary lending center, and more recently, between 2000 and 2011, as the reading room for the African Studies Library.

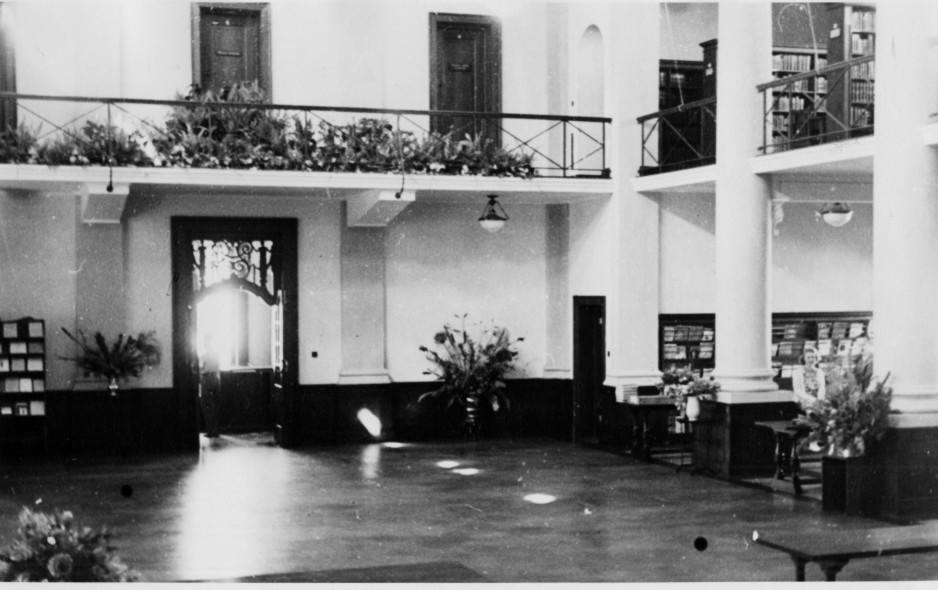
Entrance to Jagger Library with floral decorations in 1947

By 1980, the library was part of an eight-library complex at the University of Cape Town, and was the headquarters of the university's library service. It then contained 518,000 of the 741,000 volumes available in the library network, and could house 1280 readers in its reading rooms.

In 2011, the university began a project aimed at restoring the Jagger Library to its original condition. The walkways and balconies installed in the 1960s and 1970s were removed, and it was subsequently painted, refurnished, and had its original elements restored, becoming once again the main library of the University of Cape Town.

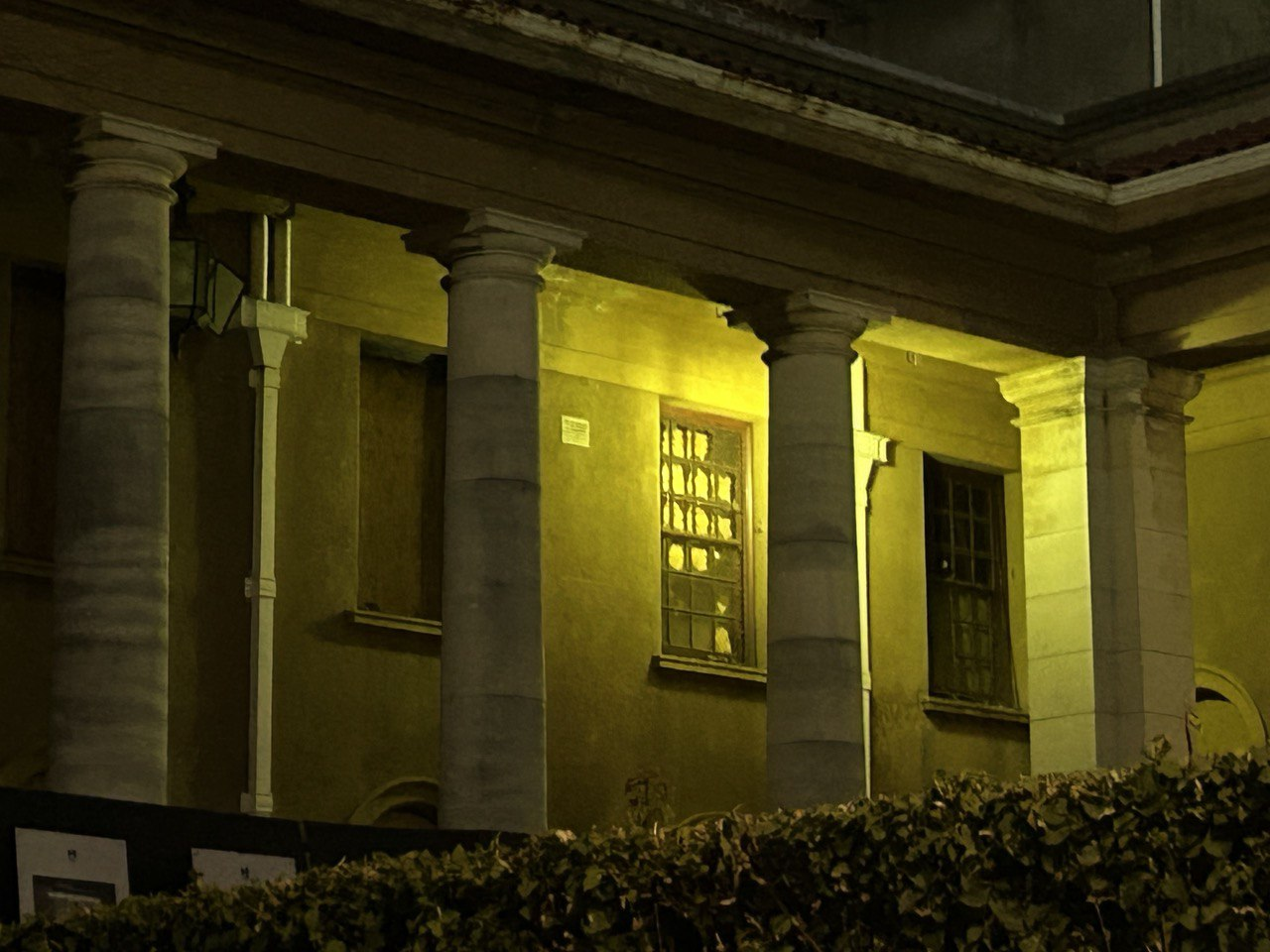
Windows damaged by the fire in 2021

It was partially destroyed by the April 2021 Table Mountain fire. However, the library's fire detection systems stopped the destruction of the entire collection. The salvage operation ended on 18 May. The collections are currently housed in temporary off-site storage.
