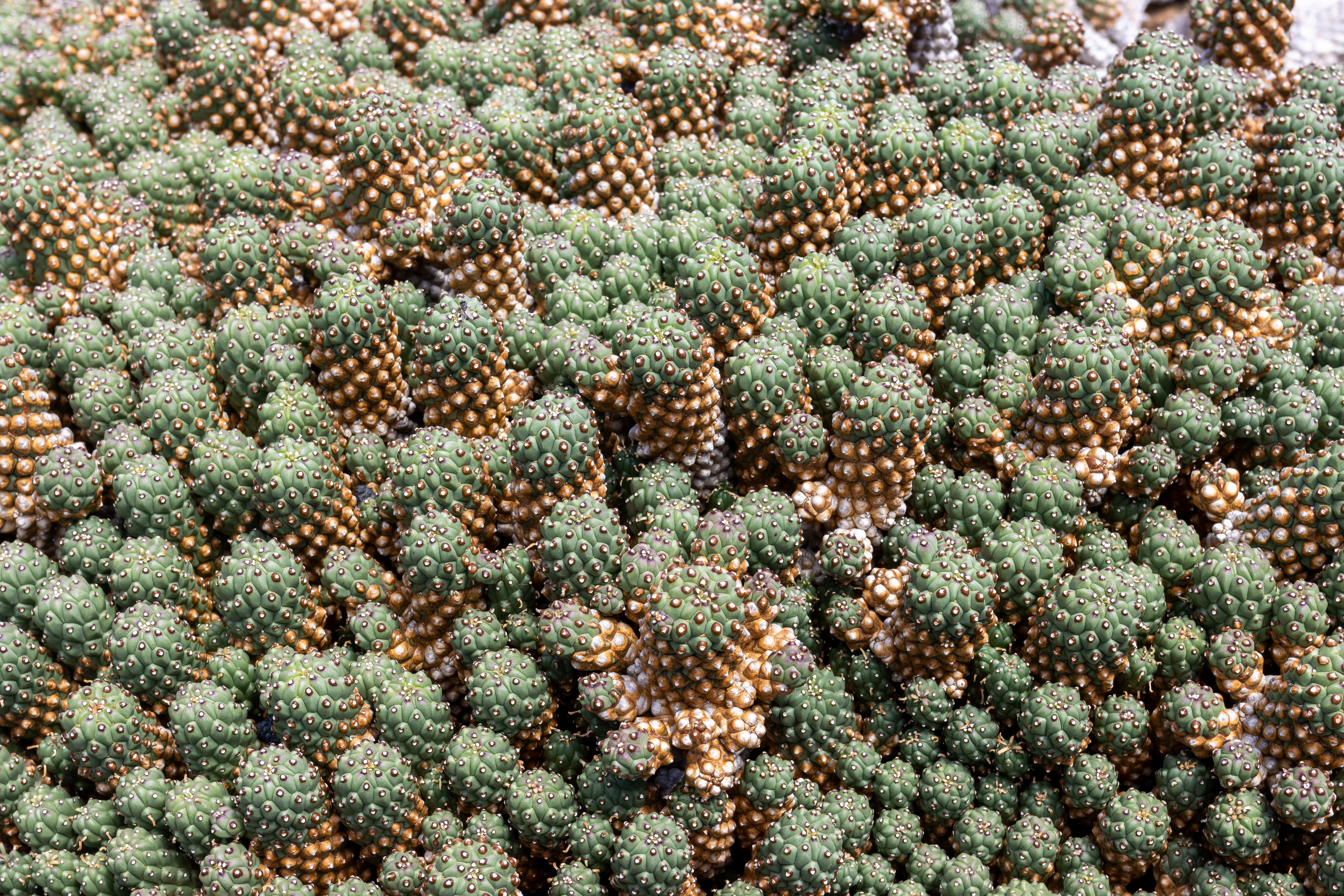
- CITES Appendix II

Scientific classification
- Kingdom: Plantae
- Clade: Embryophytes
- Clade: Tracheophytes
- Clade: Spermatophytes
- Clade: Angiosperms
- Clade: Eudicots
- Clade: Rosids
- Order: Malpighiales
- Family: Euphorbiaceae
- Tribe: Euphorbieae
- Subtribe: Euphorbiinae
- Genus: Euphorbia
- Species: E. caput-medusae

Binomial name
- Euphorbia caput-medusae L.

= Euphorbia caput-medusae =

Species of flowering plant in the spurge family

Euphorbia caput-medusae ("Medusa's Head") is a plant of the genus Euphorbia that occurs in and around Cape Town, South Africa.

== Description ==
This succulent resembles the head of Medusa, with many serpent-like stems arising from a short, central caudex. They sometimes exceed 1 metre (3 ft 3 in) in diameter, partly buried in the ground, covered with numerous crowded branches.

Euphorbia caput-medusae was introduced to the Netherlands around 1700 and was one of the early plants described by Linnaeus (Species Plantarum, 1753).

== Distribution ==
This species is primarily coastal, occurring along the western coast of South Africa, southwards to the Cape Peninsula. It is still common around Cape Town where it grows in deep sand or rocky outcrops on the coast. It is particularly common in the Peninsula Shale Renosterveld vegetation of Signal Hill.

It also occurs along the south coast of the Western Cape Province, from Cape Town the form previously known as muirii extends along the coast eastwards as far as Mossel Bay.
