= 2006 Table Mountain fire =

Large fire on Table Mountain, South Africa

Table Mountain Fire (2006)
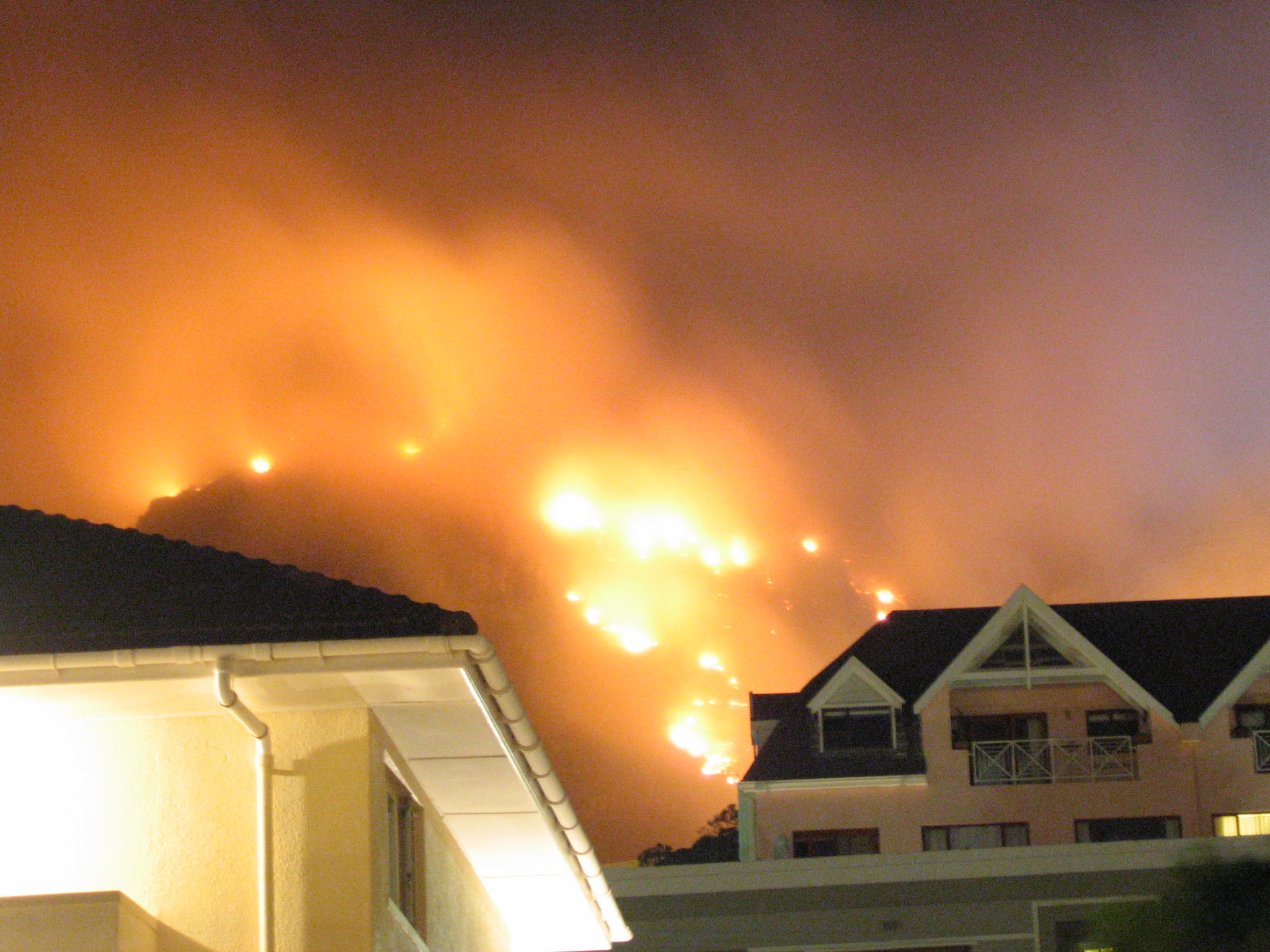
- Burning close to Vredehoek, 27 January
- Date: 26 January - 28 January 2006
- Location: Table Mountain National Park, South Africa
- Coordinates: 33°57′0″S 18°24′30″E

Map
- Location within South Africa

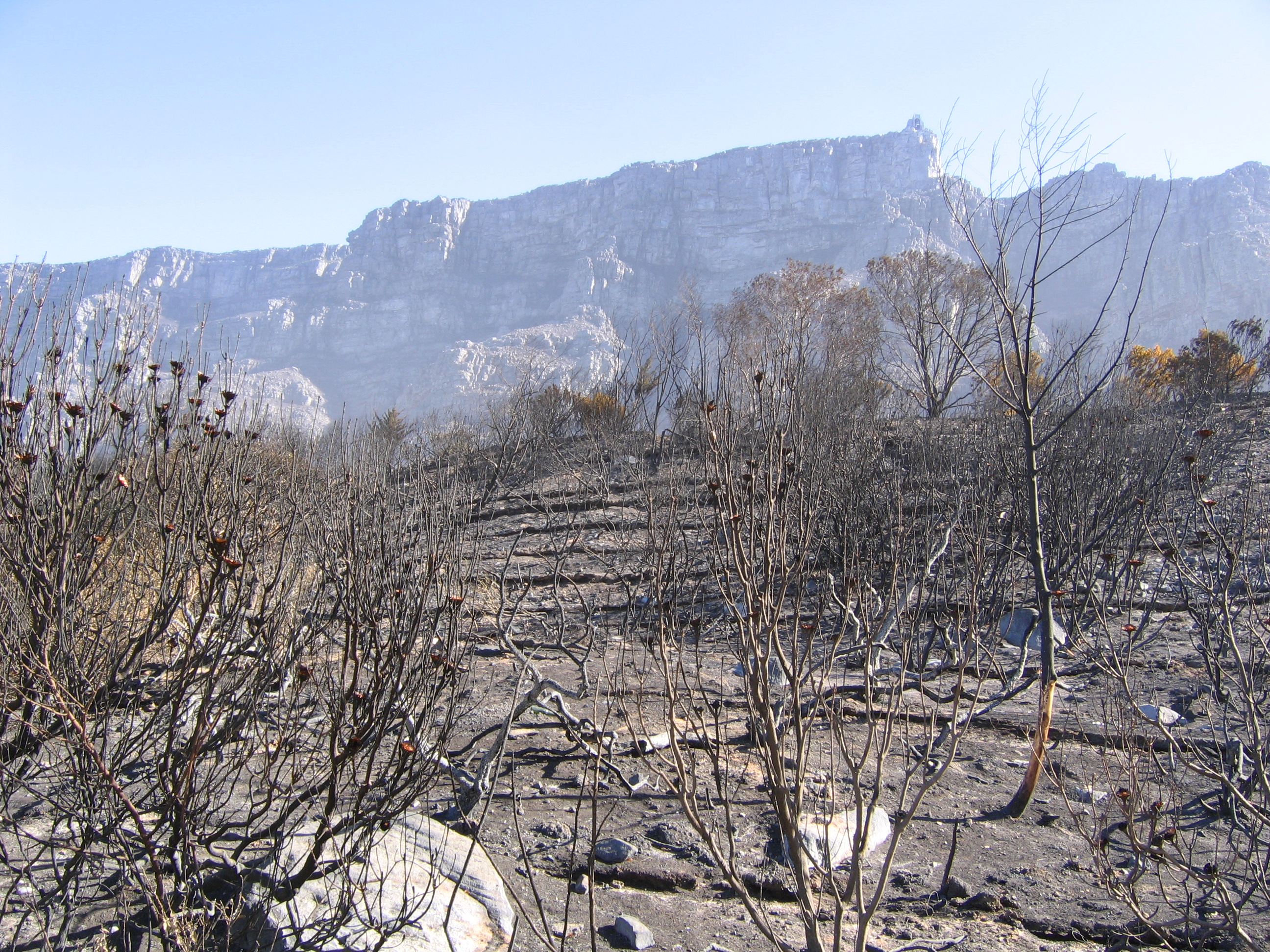
Aftermath of the fire, looking from the edge of Oranjezicht towards the mountain

The 2006 Table Mountain fire was a large fire in and around the Table Mountain National Park in Cape Town, South Africa. It broke out at approximately 4 p.m. on 26 January 2006 above Tafelberg Road, and spread quickly due to dry conditions and strong winds of up to 60 knots (110 km/h; 69 mph). It threatened to spread into the densely populated suburbs of Tamboerskloof, Oranjezicht, Vredehoek and Gardens on the north side, as well as Camps Bay and Bantry Bay on the south side.

Janet Chesworth, a 65-year-old British tourist, died from smoke inhalation while hiking near the lower cable station along with her daughter, Linda. A group of three German tourists were found unharmed on the mountain, and two tourists were also airlifted off the mountain while they waited on a rock near the upper cable car station. Up to sixteen hikers were also reportedly stranded on Table Mountain and Signal Hill. A number of homes were destroyed, as well as three cars along Tafelberg Road. An estimated 7 km^{2} of fynbos vegetation was destroyed on the first day of the blaze and, according to conservation officials, approximately 40 to 50% of the world's Silver leaf tree population — found only in Stellenbosch, Paarl, Lion's Head and the Kirstenbosch National Botanical Garden — had perished in the blaze.

Three helicopters from Working on Fire, a government-private poverty alleviation initiative, waterbombed the blaze for most of the afternoon of the 26th, but had to leave the area as darkness fell. At that time, the fire was being fought by 150 firefighters and twenty reserve firefighters as well as volunteer wildfire specialists from the Volunteer Wildfire Services. On the morning of 27 January, waterbombing by six helicopters aided by a spotter plane resumed when daylight returned, and the fire was seemingly under control by early morning. More than one hundred firefighters worked through the night to contain the blaze, with the abating winds helping speed the process.

However, in the early evening of the 27th the wind picked up, fanning hotspots still left over and by nightfall the mountain was ablaze, and, despite extra firefighters brought in from as far afield as Clanwilliam and Mpumalanga, a long night's work was predicted for emergency personnel.

Around 4:30 a.m. on the 28th the fire severed an electrical main line that supplied some of the higher-lying suburbs, leaving them without electricity until late the afternoon. By this time, firefighters also reported that the fire was completely under control. With the wind keeping low during the night, no additional flare-ups occurred.

Many citizens of Cape Town supported the firefighters with refreshments and in one case, fuel.

A 36-year-old British man, Anthony Cooper of Gowerton, was arrested on the 26th after allegedly causing the fire by discarding a burning cigarette butt from his car while stopped on the mountain. In addition to being charged with arson, he faced a potential culpable homicide charge after the death of the British tourist. The City of Cape Town noted its intention to pursue a civil claim against Cooper. On 23 May, after he failed to appear for an unrelated charge of driving under the influence two days before the fire, magistrate Ingrid Freitag issued a warrant for Cooper's arrest and provisionally forfeited his bail. Cooper claimed that he had phoned the national emergency number when he realized a fire had started, allegedly through his own actions. In January 2008, Cooper was found not guilty of causing the fire, on the basis of reasonable doubt.

== See also ==
- 2009 Table Mountain fire
