= Lion's Head (Cape Town) =

Mountain in Cape Town, South Africa

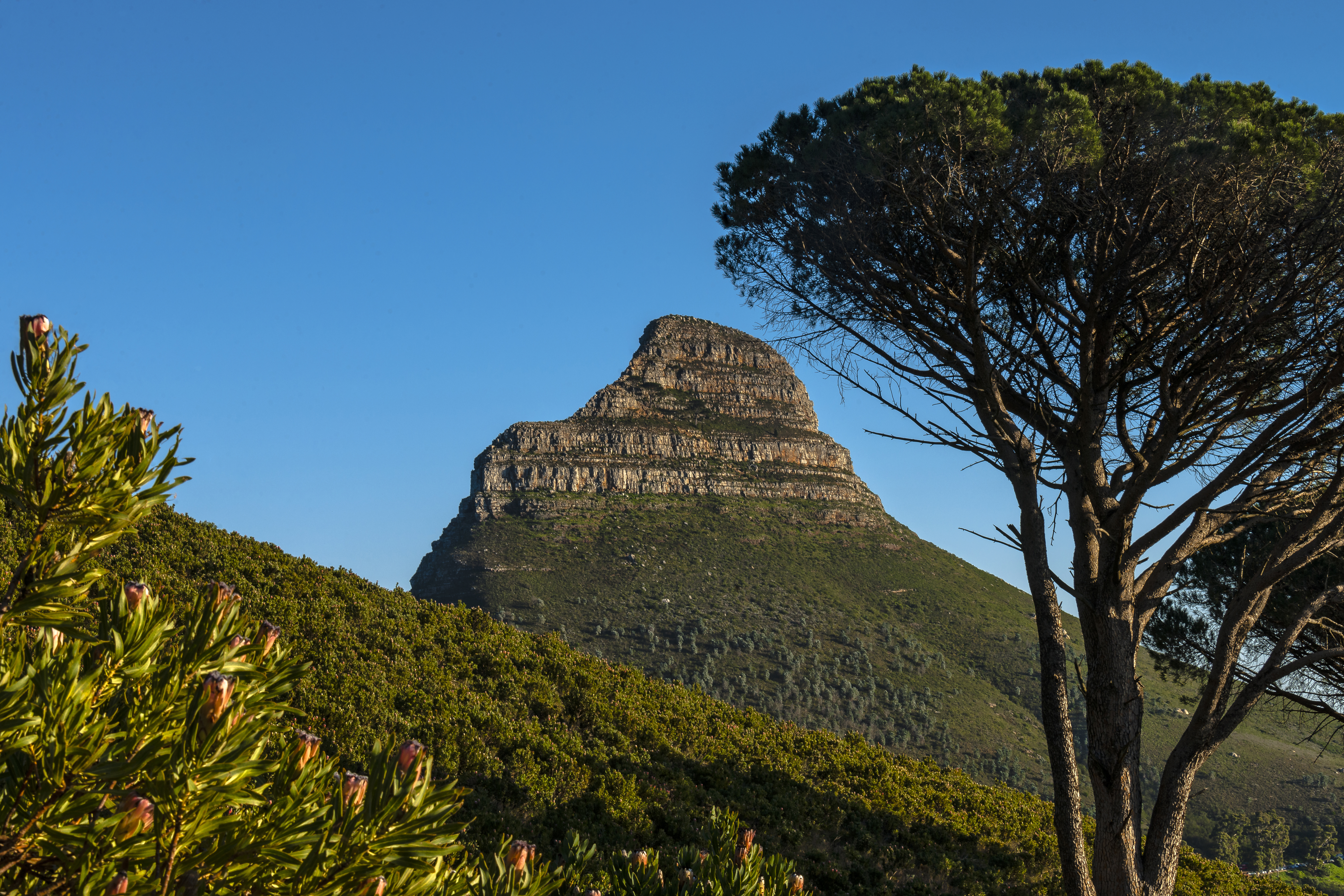
- Lion's Head from the slopes of Table Mountain

Highest point
- Elevation: 669 m (2,195 ft)
- Coordinates: 33°56′05″S 18°23′21″E

Geography
- Location: Western Cape, South Africa

Geology
- Rock age: Silurian / Ordovician

Climbing
- Easiest route: Hike

Lion's Head is a mountain in Cape Town, South Africa, between Table Mountain and Signal Hill. Lion's Head peaks at 669 metres (2,195 ft) above sea level. The peak forms part of a dramatic backdrop to the city of Cape Town and is part of the Table Mountain National Park.

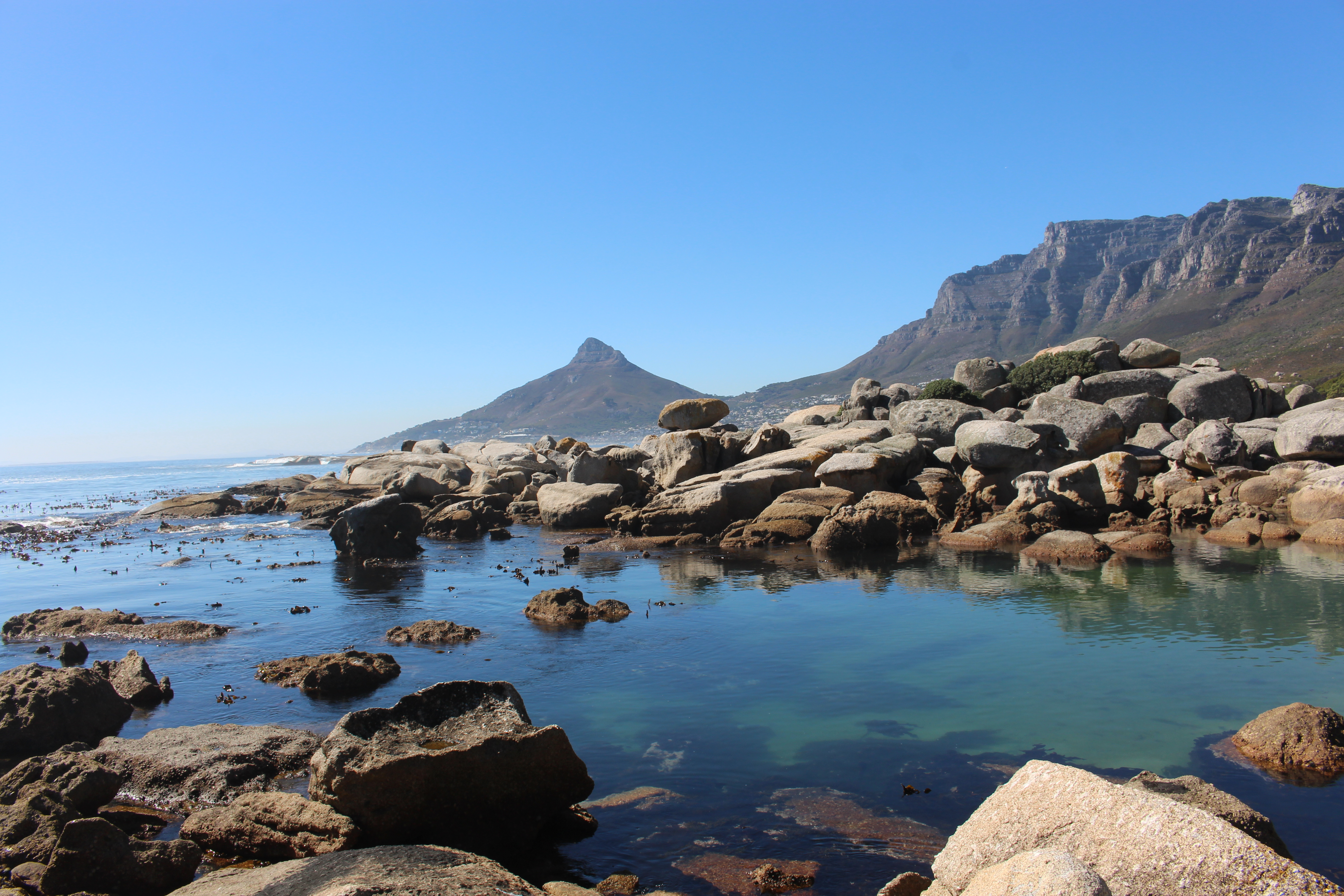
Lion's Head viewed from Oudekraal Beach

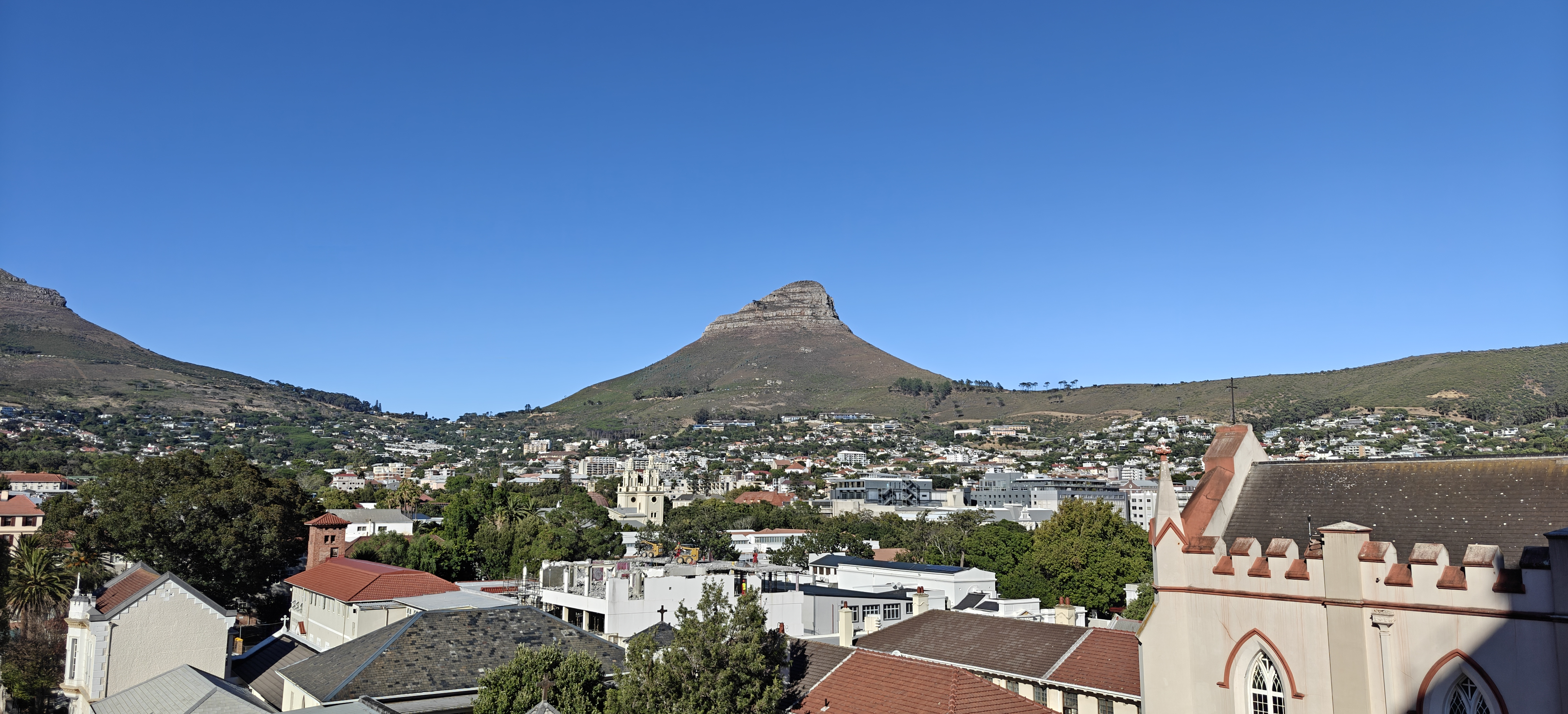
Lion's Head from Cape Town CBD

== Surrounding ==
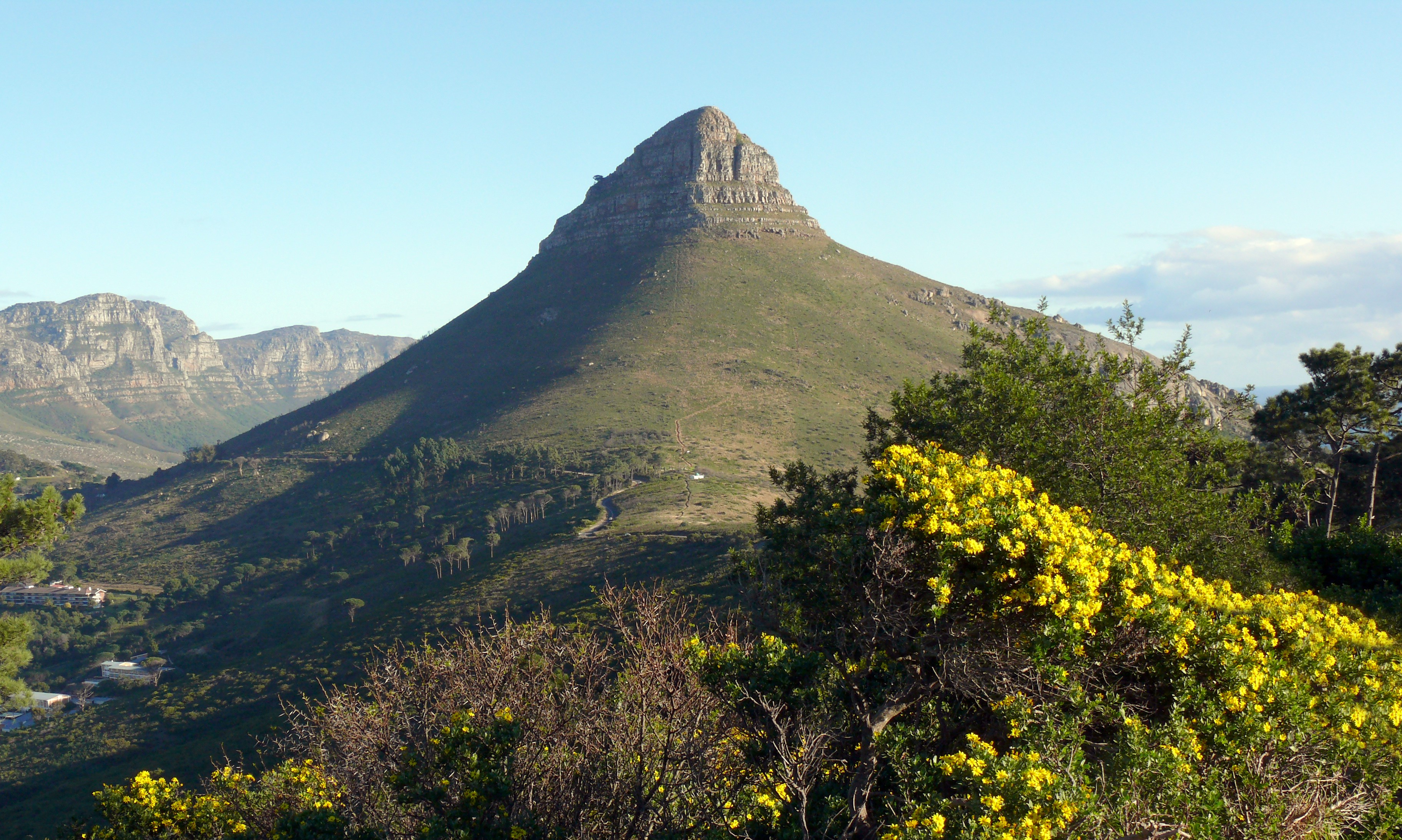
Lion's Head viewed from Signal Hill

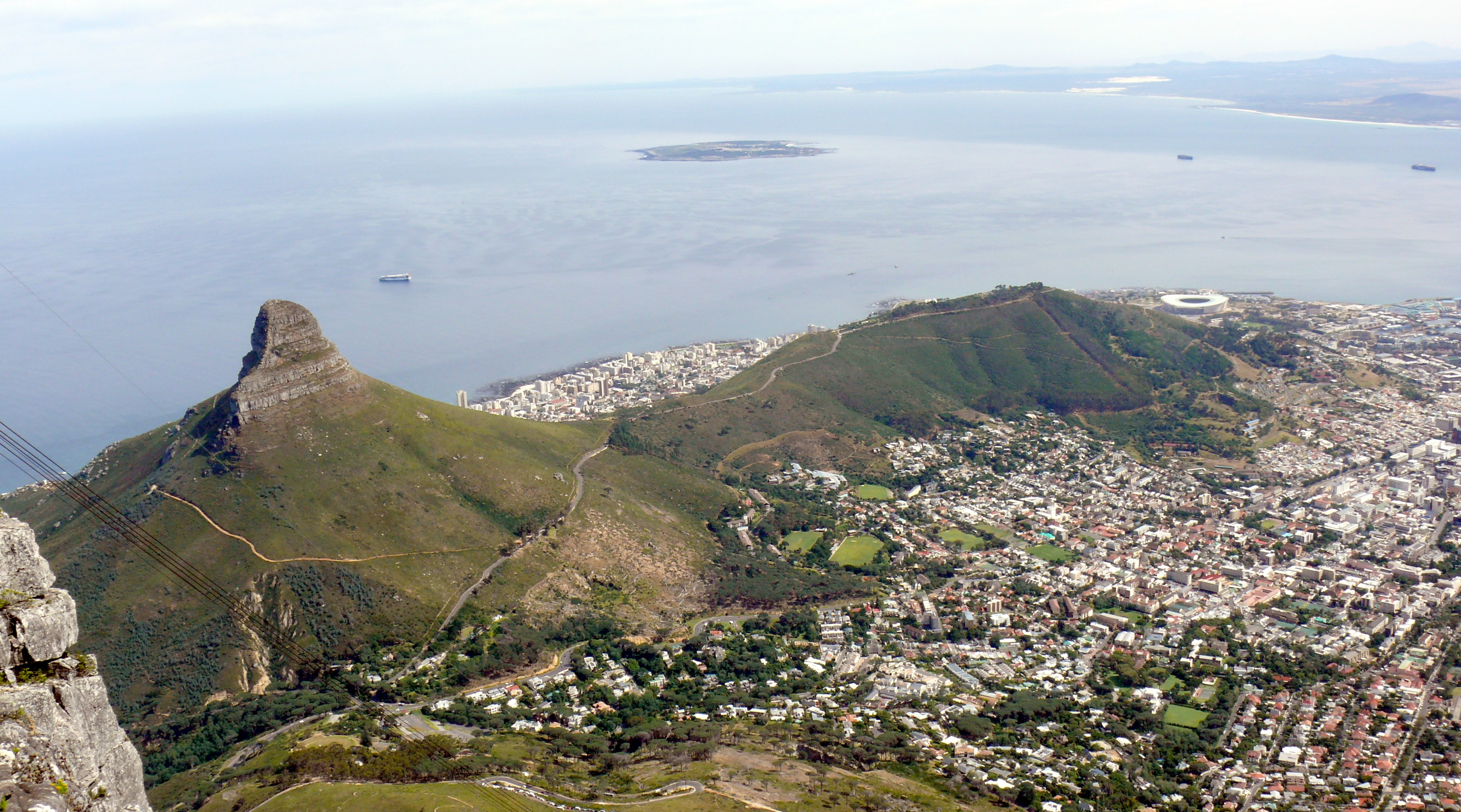
Lion's Head and Signal Hill from the Summit of Table Mountain, with Robben Island (top, middle) in Table Bay

The suburbs of the city surround the peak and Signal Hill on almost all sides, but strict management by city authorities has kept development of housing off the higher ground. The area is significant to the Cape Malay community, who historically lived in the Bo-Kaap quarter close to Lion's Head.

There are a number of historic graves and shrines (kramats) of Malay leaders on the lower slopes and on Signal Hill.

== History ==
In the 17th century the peak was known as Leeuwen Kop (Lion's Head) by the Dutch, and Signal Hill was known as Leeuwen Staart (Lion's Tail), as the shape resembles a crouching lion or a sphinx. The English in the 17th century called the peak Sugar Loaf.

In 1897 gold was discovered on Lion's Head. A company was floated and a shaft sunk to a depth of more than 30 metres. However, the grade was too low, and the mine closed in the following year. Subsequently, the shaft was filled in and a small depression is all that remains today.

== Activities ==
Lion's Head is known for its views of both the city and the Atlantic Seaboard, and the hour-long walk to the top is particularly popular during a full moon. Its slopes are also used as a launching point for paragliders.

Lion's Head and Table Mountain peek above clouds

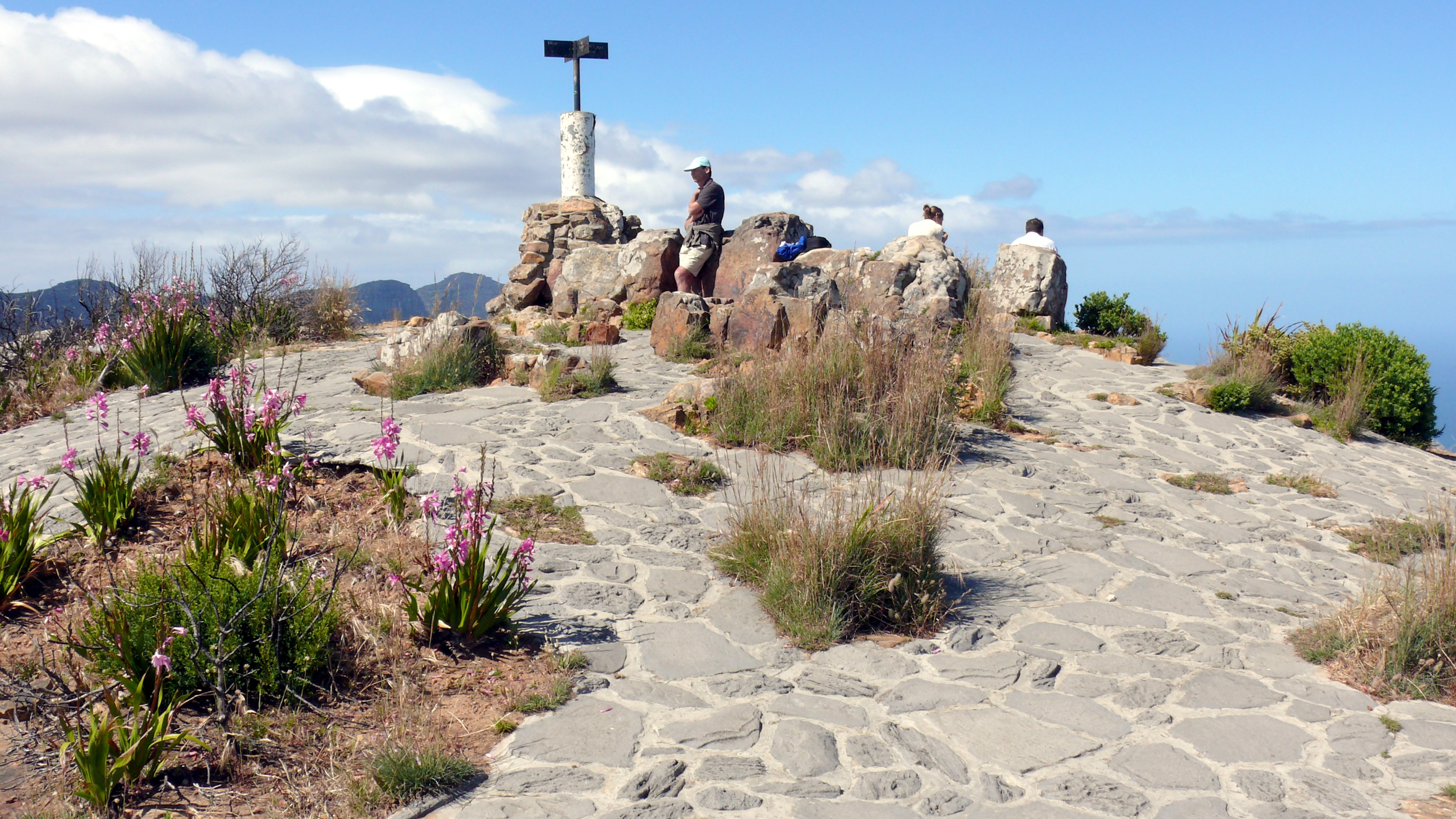
The summit of Lion's Head

== Geology, flora and fauna ==
The upper part of the peak consists of flat-lying Table Mountain sandstone and the lower slopes are formed by the Cape Granite and the Malmesbury formation, which are older Precambrian rocks.

Lion's Head is covered in fynbos (indigenous Cape vegetation), with an unusually rich biodiversity that supports a variety of small animals. Three main vegetation types can be found in this relatively small area. All three of them are endemic to the city of Cape Town and can be found nowhere else. Most of Lion's Head is covered in endangered Granite Fynbos, which fades into Peninsula Shale Renosterveld (critically endangered) on the lower slopes towards Signal Hill in the north. Right on the summit of Lion's Head however, is a tiny patch of endangered Sandstone Fynbos, a different ecosystem that is also found nearby on the top of Table Mountain.

== See also ==
- Signal Hill – Hill in Cape Town
- Table Mountain – Mountain overlooking Cape Town, South Africa
