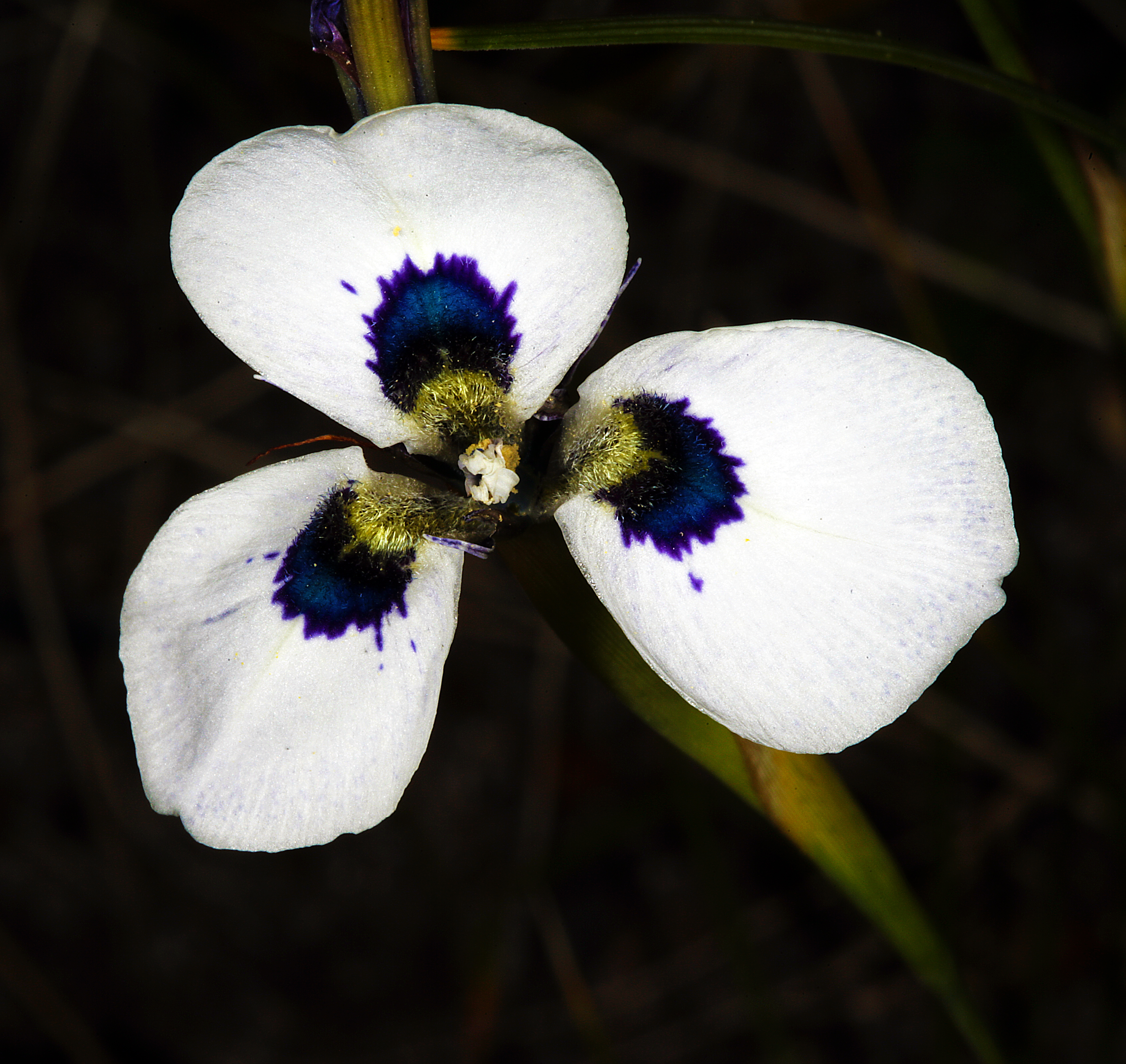

Scientific classification
- Kingdom: Plantae
- Clade: Embryophytes
- Clade: Tracheophytes
- Clade: Angiosperms
- Clade: Monocots
- Order: Asparagales
- Family: Iridaceae
- Genus: Moraea
- Species: M. aristata

Binomial name
- Moraea aristata (D.Delaroche) Asch. & Graebn.

Synonyms
- Ferraria ocellaris Salisb. Ferraria tricuspis Willd. Iris imberbis Ker Gawl. Iris pavonia Curtis; Iris tricuspis Willd. Moraea glaucopis (DC.) Drapiez; Vieusseuxia aristata D.Delaroche; Vieusseuxia glaucopis DC.

= Moraea aristata =

Species of flowering plant

Moraea aristata is a species of flowering plant in the family Iridaceae. It is referred to by the common names blue-eyed uintjie or Blouooguintjie in Afrikaans. It is endemic to the city of Cape Town and is considered to be critically endangered.

== Description ==
Moraea aristata is a winter-flowering bulb (geophyte) that produces large and striking flowers. It grows 25–35 cm (9.8–13.8 in) tall and sometimes branches once. It has one linear leaf growing from the base. It is usually longer than the stem, and often trails on the ground. The stem and leaf are hairless. The corms have a diameter of around 15 mm (0.59 in) and are covered in pale fibers.

Flowers are present in September. They grow on the end of the stem, or sometimes on short side branches. The outer petals are white, with a large spot of iridescent blue at the base of each one. The blue patches are outlined in violet, or sometimes yellow and have a broad, black, hairy base. The tepal claws are yellow and speckled with black or violet. The inner petals split into three lobes, with a long, straight central cusp. While each flower lasts only three days, several flowers are produced over a period of three to four weeks.

The seed capsules have an oblong shape and split open from the top. They contain light brown, angular seeds.

== Distribution and habitat ==
This plant naturally only occurs in Peninsula Shale Renosterveld vegetation in northern Cape Town. Due to the growth of the city, its habitat now mostly lies under urban sprawl. Until recently, it only naturally survived in the grounds of the South African Astronomical Observatory in the suburb of Observatory near the foot of Devil's Peak. This tiny, isolated population is not sustainable in the long term due to low genetic diversity and ongoing human disturbance. In 2017 and 2018, it was reintroduced to the Rondebosch Common, providing new hope for its survival in the wild. The species has also become naturalised in Australia.

== Ecology ==
The blue-eyed uintjie is pollinated by monkey beetles, which are drawn to the center of the flowers by the blue nectar guides on the petals.

Seed dispersal occurs through wind. Seeds are released when the seed capsules split open in summer.

== Conservation ==
This species is classified as being critically endangered by SANBI as it has lost most of its habitat to urbanisation. In spite of its extraordinary rarity in the wild, it is easy to cultivate in sunny gardens with sandy or clay soils.

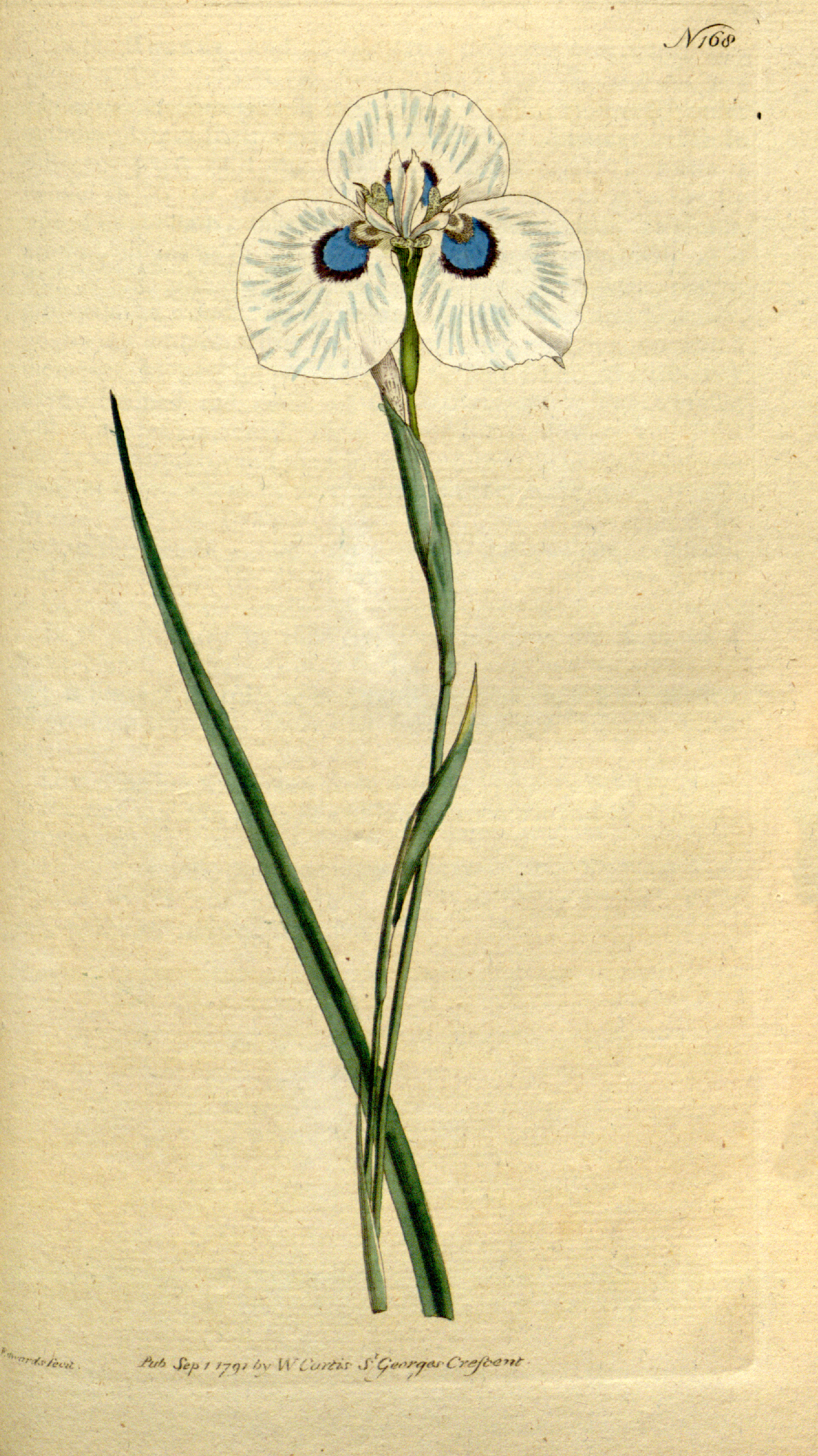

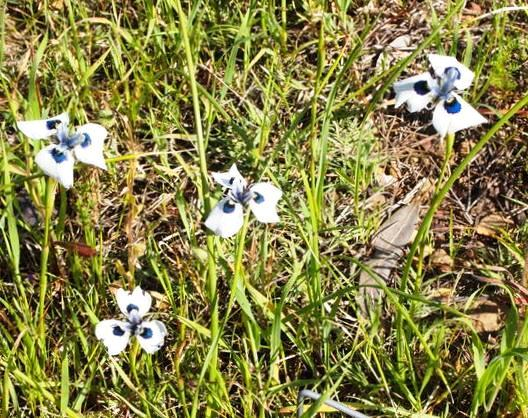
Plants photographed in the grounds of the South African Astronomical Observatory

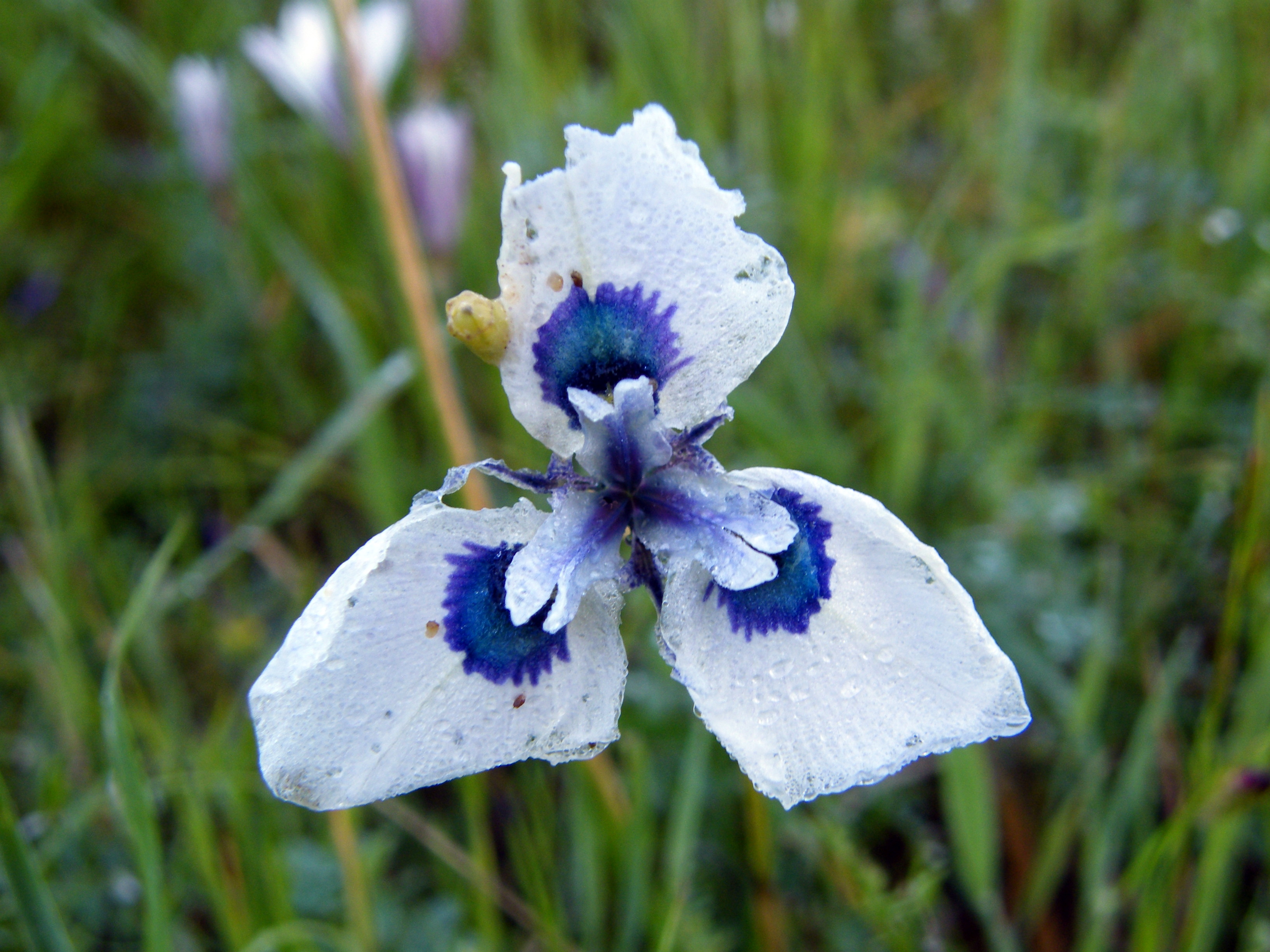
Detail of inflorescence
