= Peninsula Shale Renosterveld =

Vegetation type found only in South Africa

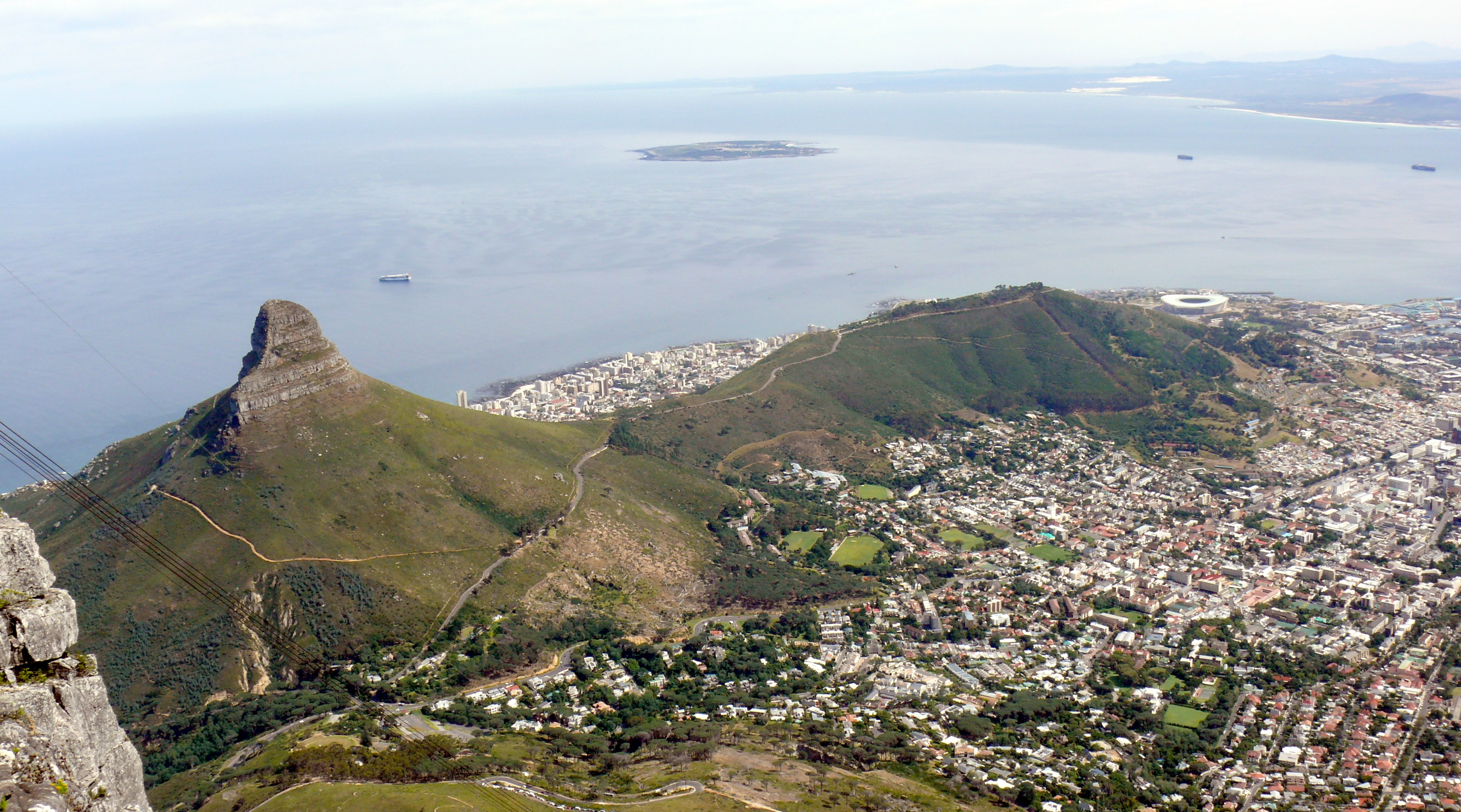
Signal Hill preserves one of the two last remnants of Peninsula Shale Renosterveld in the world.

Peninsula Shale Renosterveld (PSR) is a unique vegetation type that is endemic to the slopes of Signal Hill and Devil's Peak in Cape Town, South Africa. It is critically endangered.

== Habitat ==
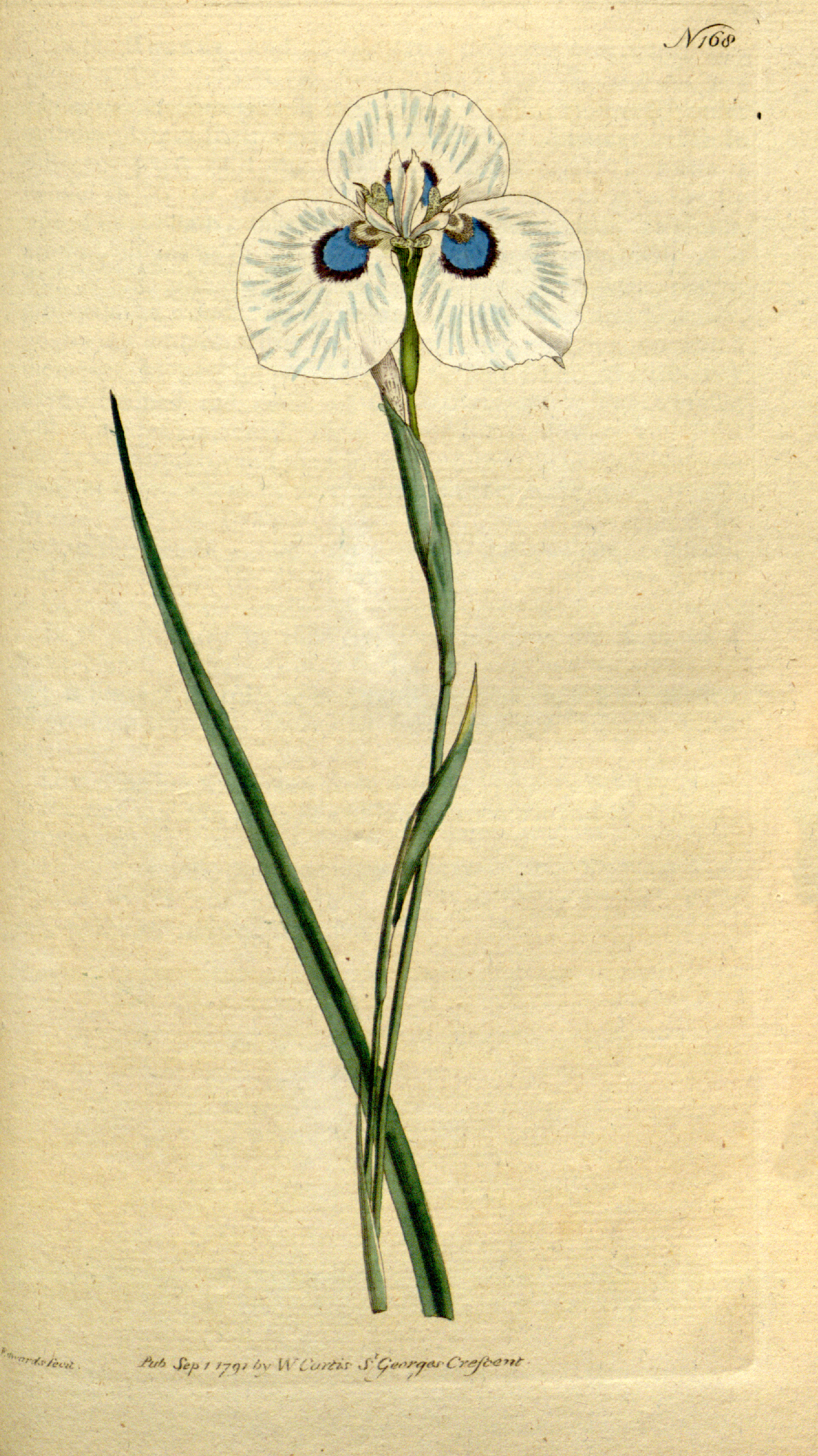
The critically endangered Moraea aristata flower exists only in Peninsula Shale Renosterveld.

This unique type of Renosterveld is indigenous and endemic to the Cape Town City Bowl but, due to the growth of this city, it now survives only on the slopes of Signal Hill and Devil's Peak.

It is subject to very frequent fires, and is therefore dominated by a wide variety of grass and bulb species. There are a large variety of tall shrubs such as the Wax Karee, but the Renosterbos bush (the signature plant of Renosterveld) is relatively less common. At its southern boundary, this vegetation type gradually merges into Fynbos.

The critically endangered blue-eyed uintjie (Moraea aristata) flower is totally endemic to this vegetation type and occurs nowhere else.

== Soils and climate ==
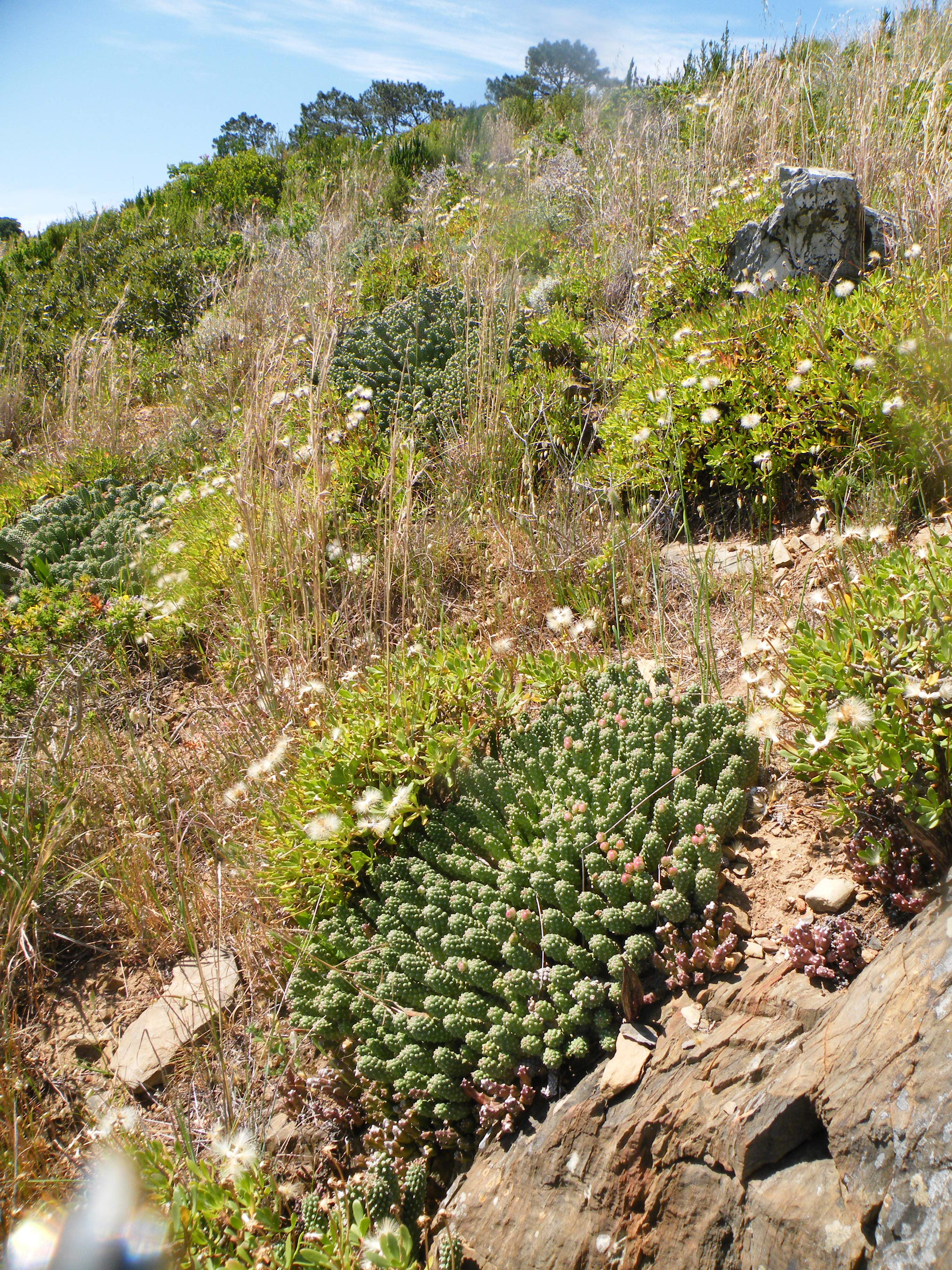
The north slope of Signal Hill, with Medusas-Head euphorbias visible

The soils in this area are composed predominantly of hard, fertile clay that originates from the older shales of the Malmesbury Group. Like most of the Cape, this is a winter-rainfall area, and Peninsula Shale Renosterveld is the wettest type of Renosterveld vegetation that exists.

== Threats and conservation ==
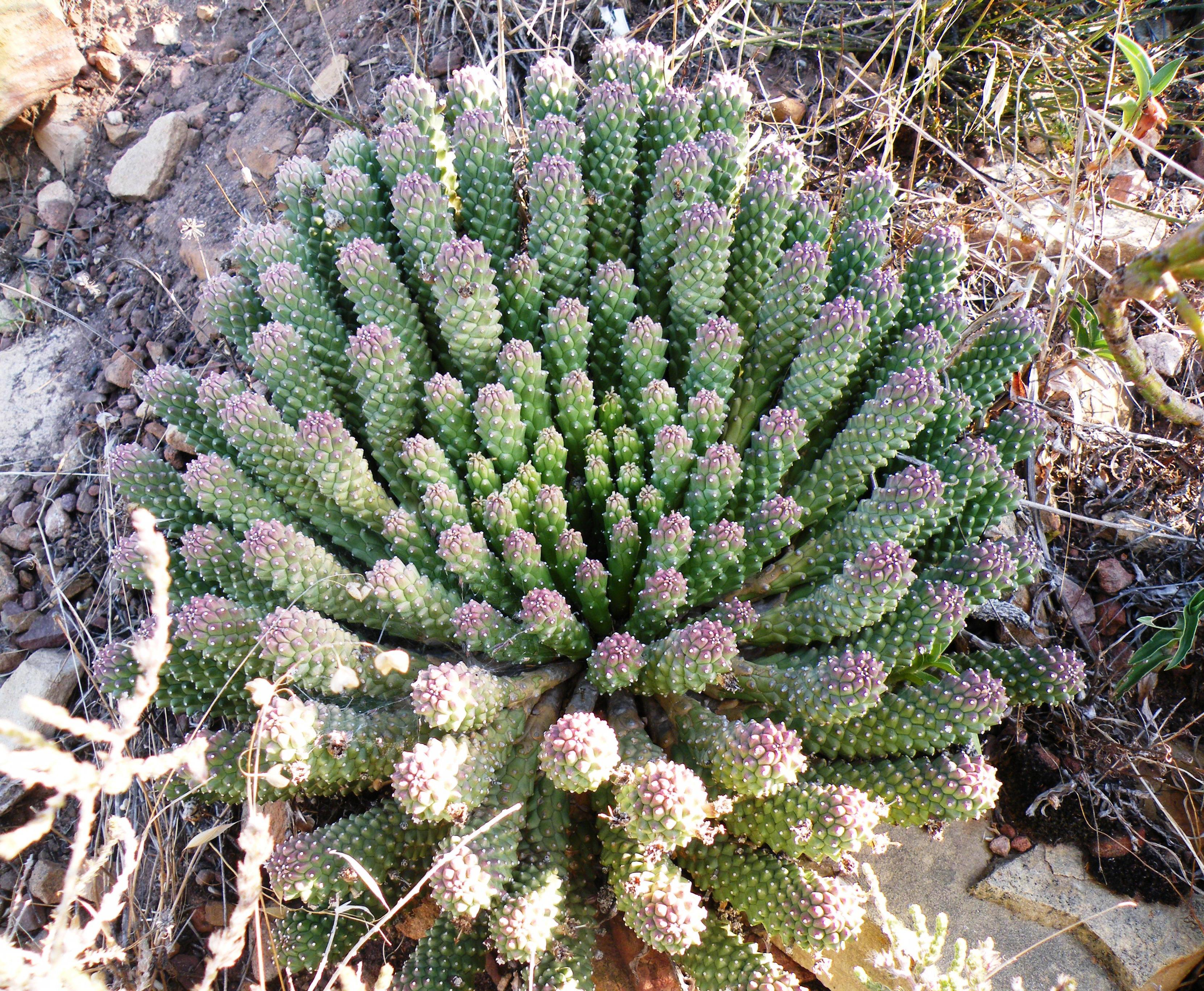
The Medusa's Head succulent grows naturally in this vegetation type.

In the past, this vegetation was incredibly productive, supporting large game animals such as rhinoceros, Eland and Cape lions. However, due to its being centred on what is now Cape Town’s city centre, the vast majority has been destroyed and replaced by urban development. Only 13 percent remains, and only 11 percent of it is protected from development. This is considerably below the national conservation target of 26%, and makes it critically endangered. The remaining patches are relatively healthy and host a variety of activities such as picnics, dog walking and hiking. The biggest threats are from invasive alien plants (especially wattle trees and invasive grasses), fire protection (this vegetation needs to burn about once every four years) and mowing (which kills all but the smallest and lowest plants). Due to urban sprawl as well as nutritional reasons, the two surviving patches of PSR are the only two areas in Cape Town where large game animals could feasibly be reintroduced.

== See also ==
- Biodiversity of Cape Town
- Swartland Shale Renosterveld
- Peninsula Granite Fynbos
- Renosterveld
- Table Mountain
