= University Estate =

Residential suburb of Cape Town, Western Cape, South Africa

- Interactive map of University Estate
- Coordinates: 33°56′20″S 18°27′5″E
- Country: South Africa
- Province: Western Cape
- Municipality: City of Cape Town

Area
  - Total: 0.27 km^{2} (0.10 sq mi)

Population (2011)
  - Total: 987
  - Density: 3,700/km^{2} (9,500/sq mi)

Racial makeup (2011)
  - Black African: 5.0%
  - Coloured: 29.8%
  - Indian/Asian: 10.9%
  - White: 44.4%
  - Other: 9.9%

First languages (2011)
  - English: 82.6%
  - Afrikaans: 9.0%
  - Other: 8.4%
- Time zone: UTC+2 (SAST)
- Postal code (street): 7925

University Estate is a mainly residential suburb of Cape Town located at the foot of Devil's Peak to the east of the city. University Estate has the postcode 7925.

== Relation to other suburbs ==
University Estate is bounded by the De Waal Drive to the south, the Eastern Boulevard to the north, and Mountain Road to the west. To the south lie the slopes of Devil's Peak within the Table Mountain National Park, to the north lie Woodstock and Salt River, and to the west lies District 6 ( Walmer Estate). Pedestrian access to Devil's Peak is possible via stairs to De Waal Drive on Kylemore Road and a short walkway on the median between the highway's inbound and outbound lanes. Upper Woodstock and Salt River are reachable from two pedestrian bridges across Eastern Boulevard.

== Demographics ==
Under the Apartheid Group Areas Act, University Estate was classed as an exclusively "white" area. Until the early 1990s when F.W. de Klerk's government repealed the Act in June 1991, the suburb was indeed inhabited solely by whites, a large number of the residents being from the Portuguese immigrant community. Over the following years the suburb became popular among wealthier families from previously excluded racial groups.

== Commerce ==
Since the suburb is zoned almost exclusively for residential use, there are few businesses in the area. Exceptions include 88 Roodebloem Road (a small factory complex adjacent to Eastern Boulevard), a small number of guest lodges scattered throughout the area and some low-impact home businesses. The Cape Town City Council has also approved the rezoning of and subsequent development plans for the premises of the old Rocklands site, but in early 2010 has had to intervene due to unauthorized demolition of the villa.

== Recreation ==
University Estate has a number of open spaces which are popular among children and dog owners. The play park at the intersection of Rhodes Avenue and Haig Road has see-saws, swings, a merry-go-round, a slide and a jungle gym, which attract younger children. Older children also socialize in this play park, but also make greater use of the undeveloped "quarry" field just south of the factory complex where they sometimes also ride around on quadbikes. Dog owners tend to prefer this "quarry" field or the field at the eastern end of the suburb for walking their pets, or may simply walk around the streets.

The "quarry" field and the open areas between the merging highways on the eastern side are also used by "Bergies" (as homeless people are commonly known in Cape Town) as their "home".
