= University of Cape Town Libraries =

Library system of the University of Cape Town

UCT Libraries
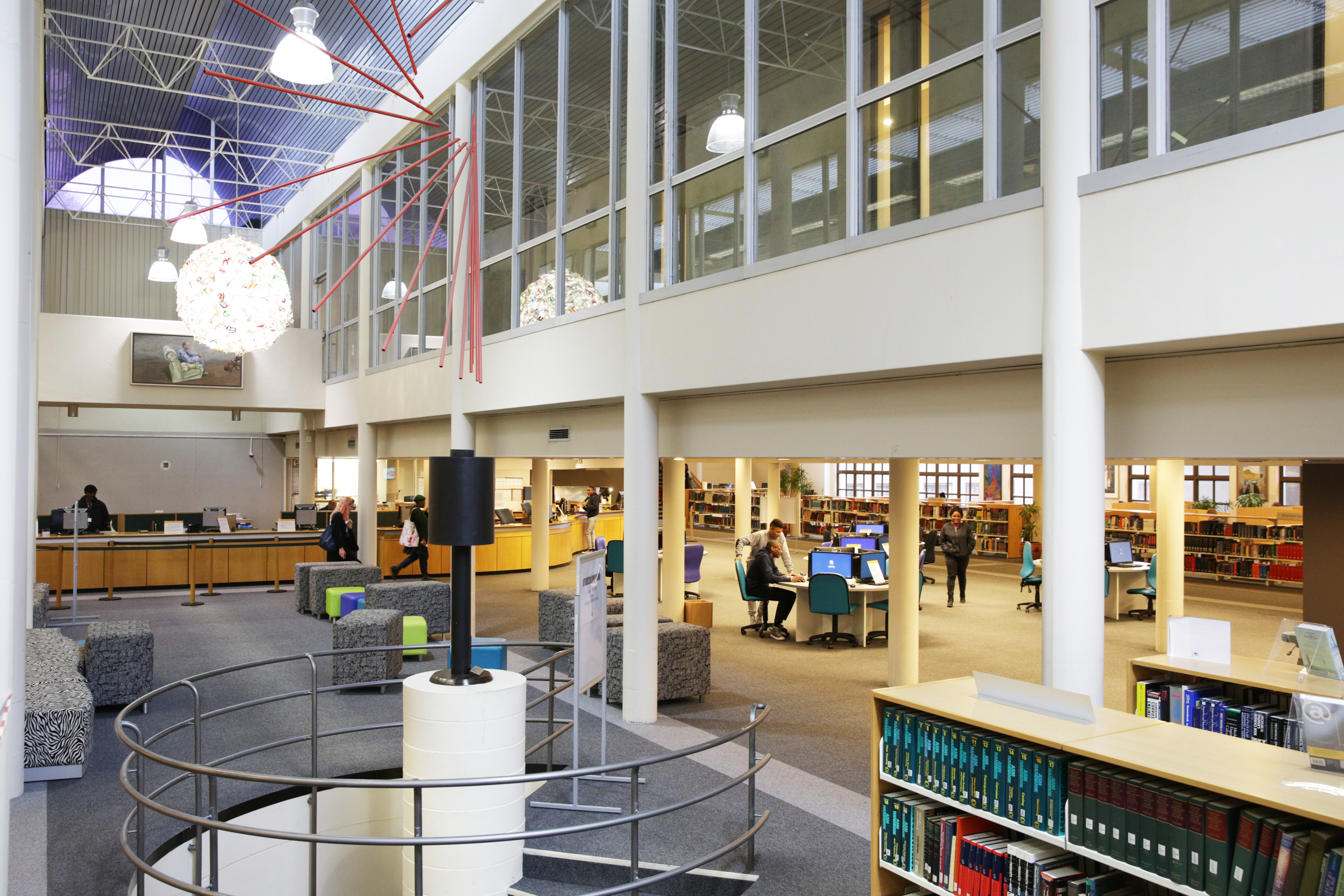
- The Hub in Chancellor Oppenheimer Library
- 33.957571°S 18.460347°E
- Location: Rondebosch, Cape Town, South Africa
- Type: Academic library
- Established: 1905
- Branches: 7

Collection
- Size: 1,2 million volumes, over 72,000 e-journals, over 28,500 print journals

Other information
- Director: Ujala Satgoor
- Website: UCT Libraries

University of Cape Town Libraries (UCT Libraries) is the library system of the University of Cape Town in Cape Town, South Africa.

The library system holds roughly 1.2 million print volumes and over 100,500 print and online journal subscriptions. An Africana research collection can be found in the Special Collections Division and consists of numerous monographs, periodicals, ephemera and multimedia sources.

UCT Libraries are specialists in subject areas including African Studies, Commerce, Centre for Higher Education Development, Engineering and the Built Environment, Government Publications, Health Sciences, Humanities, Law and Science.

== Libraries ==
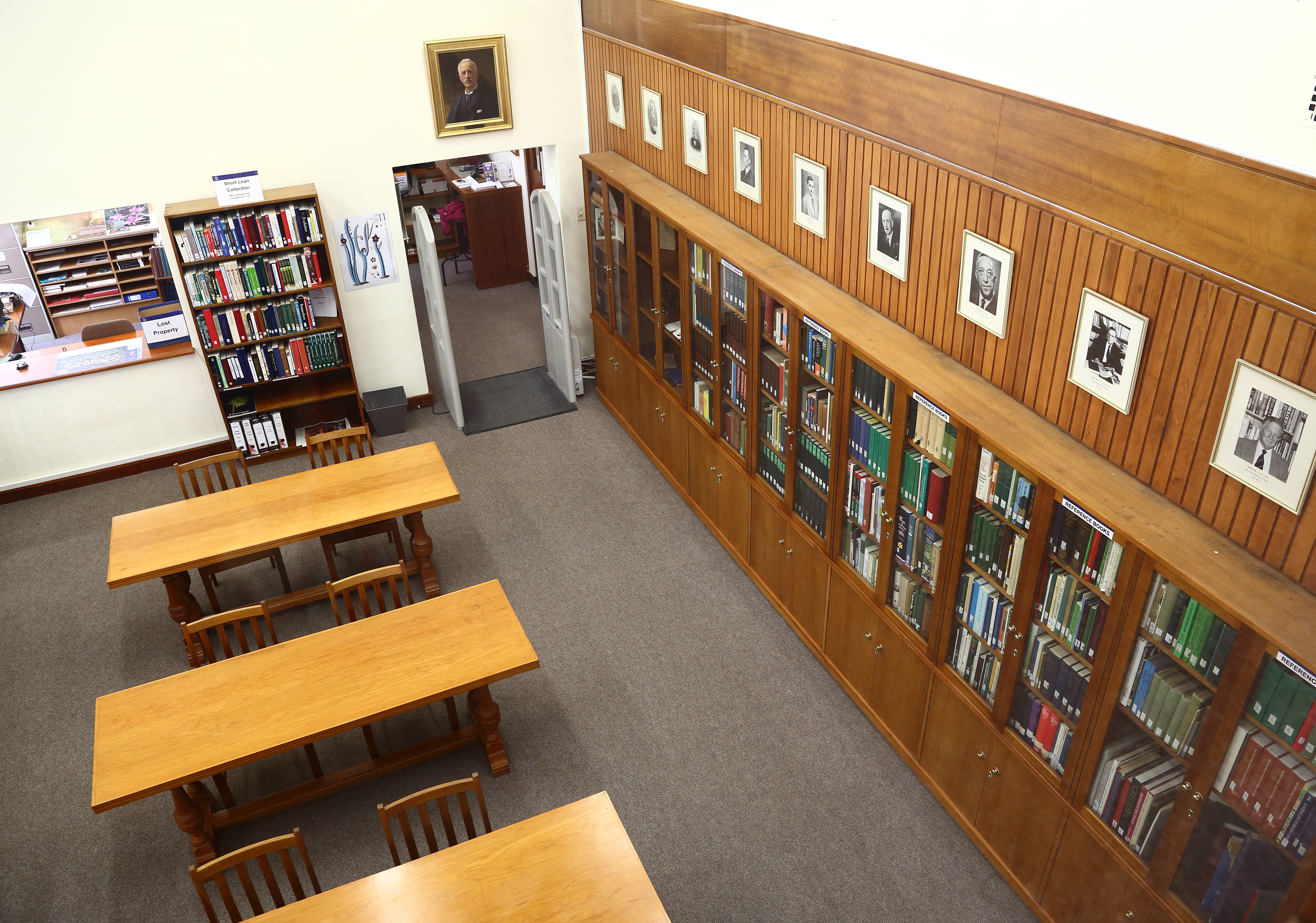
An aerial view of the Bolus Herbarium library in the Botany Building, Upper Campus, University of Cape Town

UCT Libraries comprises eight libraries located across various campuses of UCT. Chancellor Oppenheimer Library, also known as the "Main Library", is located in the centre of UCT's upper campus, serving the Science, Engineering, Commerce and Humanities faculties and the Centre for Higher Education Development. Branch libraries are found near to the faculties which they service.

- Chancellor Oppenheimer Library
- Bolus Herbarium Library
- Built Environment Library
- Bongani Mayosi Health Sciences Library
- Hiddingh Hall Library
- Institute of Child Health Library
- Brand van Zyl Law Library
- WH Bell Music Library

== History ==
The founders of the South African College expressed the need for a college library for their students in 1829. The establishment of the college library was made possible through donations from residents of Cape Town and prominent figures in the society of the time.

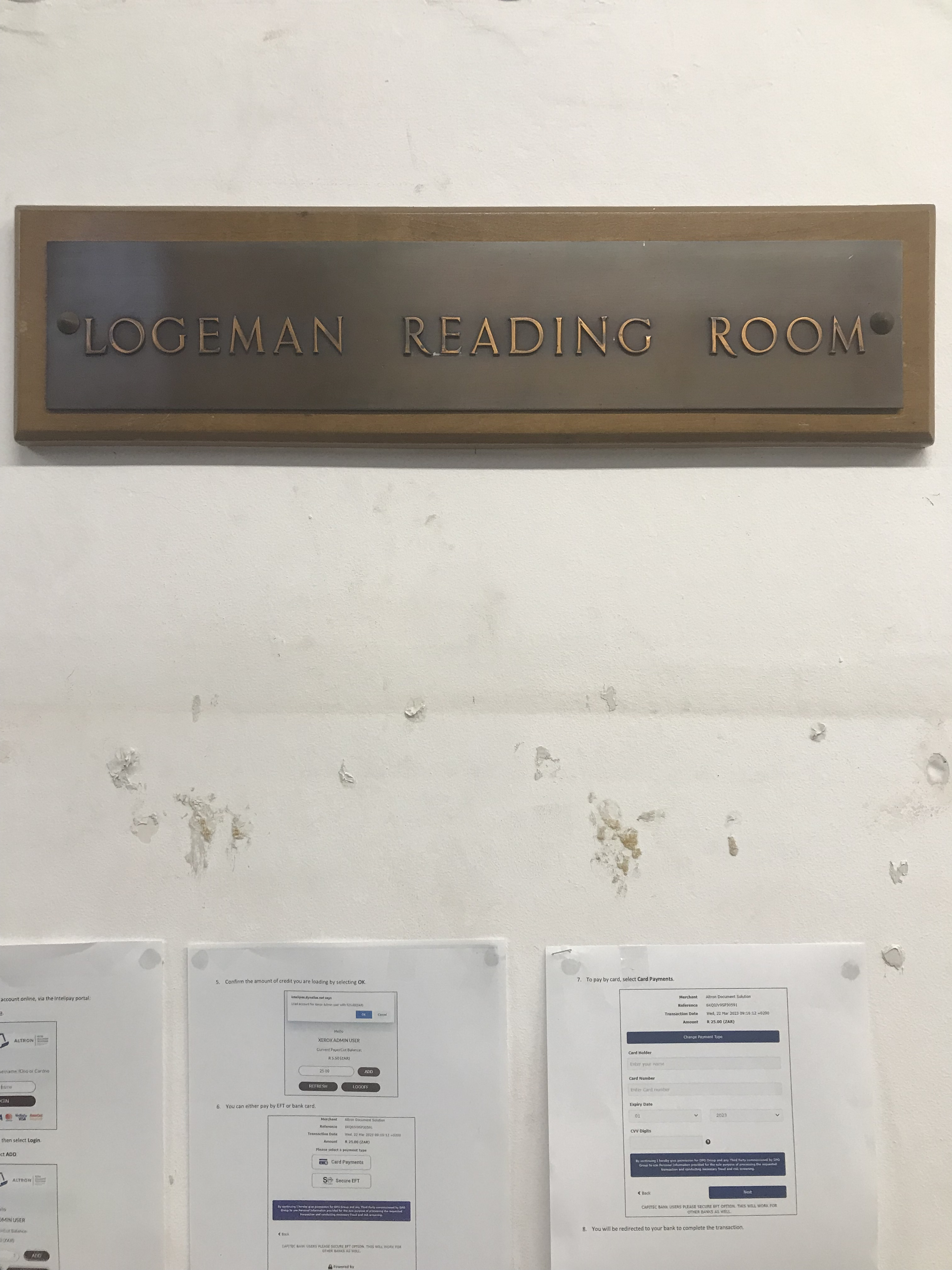
Logeman reading room - UCT

Professor W.S. Logeman, a multilingual philologist at the then South African College (SAC) was the founder of what became the University Library. From 1905 to 1920, Logeman was appointed Honorary Librarian and became the first chairman of the University Library. To commemorate his contribution in the founding of the university's library system, the Logeman Reading Room within the Hiddingh Hall Library was established in 1967.

When Hiddingh Memorial Hall opened in 1911, the ground floor became the home of the College Library, the first purpose-built library of the South African College. The Logeman Reading Room opened inside Hiddingh Hall Library in 1967 to commemorate Logeman's contribution to the founding of the university library.

In April 2021 the Special Collections Library was destroyed by a wildfire resulting in the loss of many of the 1,300 collections and over 85,000 books and other items held there.

== Repositories ==
- OpenUCT is the University of Cape Town's open access institutional repository. It houses scholarly outputs such as theses, dissertations, journal articles and other open educational resources. The platform was launched in 2014 and managed by UCT Libraries according to UCT's Open Access Policy. The Libraries' Digital Library Services department is involved in a retrospective digitisation project of all UCT theses. The aim is that all UCT's Master's and Doctoral theses, dating back to 1929, will be available via OpenUCT.
- ZivaHub is the University of Cape Town's institutional open access data repository. It houses scholarly outputs such as books, conference contributions, datasets, figures, journal contributions, media, online resources, posters, preprints, presentations, and software. The platform was launched in 2017 and is managed by UCT Libraries according to UCT's Open Access Policy and UCT's Research Data Management Policy. The Digital Library Services department (DLS), together with the UCT-wide network of Data Stewards that it convenes, actively curates the submissions to ZivaHub. The repository allows researchers to securely store and share research data supporting other scholarly outputs. Ziva is a Shona word meaning "to know".
- Ibali is the University of Cape Town's institutional showcasing repository for digital collections, hosted by UCT Libraries. Users are invited to explore an abundance of textual and audio-visual materials that reflect the diverse topics of UCT-based research. Ibali runs on a locally hosted Omeka S publishing server, in conjunction with locally installed iiif media and manifest servers. The name "Ibali" comes from the isiXhosa word for "story," encouraging users to experience many different stories while they explore the collections.

== Manuscript Collections ==
The Manuscripts and Archives Department collects primary source material of historical value for use by the academic community and other researchers. It was housed in the Jagger Reading Room of UCT Libraries which was destroyed by a wildfire on Sunday 18 April 2021. Since the Libraries are still assessing the damage and loss, the library holdings for Special Collections (African Studies Library, Government Publications, Rare Books and Manuscripts) may no longer be accurate.

=== Political Collections ===
- The Jack and Ray Simons Collection (BC1081)
- The Black Sash Collection (BC668)
- The Colin Legum Papers (BC 1329)

=== Literary Collections ===
- Richard Rive Collection
- Louis Leipoldt Collection

=== Architectural Collections ===
- Herbert Baker Collection
- Roelof Uytenbogaardt Collection

=== UCT History Collections ===
- Bleek and Lloyd Collection (BC151-156)
- René Immelman Collection
