= Volunteer Wildfire Services =

The Volunteer Wildfire Services is a group of volunteers in Cape Town, South Africa who assist local fire fighting agencies to suppress wildfires. Affiliated to the Table Mountain National Park, the VWS is the only unit of its kind in South Africa.

The VWS has three main functions:

- assist landowners with wildland fire suppression
- provide education and awareness programmes for school children, and
- provide training for private landowners in wildfire prevention and management techniques

Funding is secured through various projects that allow the Unit to operate independently and manage their own funds and resources. The VWS forms partnerships with companies in order to survive financially.

Fire fighters are on standby for 24 hours a day, for 365 days of the year. As with any volunteer organization, members are able to assist with wildfire suppression at various levels. While some are only available on weekends or after hours, others can assist at any time of the day or night.

There are various sections within the Unit, including Active Fire Fighters, Logistical Support (Drivers, Caterers, Medics, Technical Support teams), Planners, Admin, and other important groups who ensure that the organization runs smoothly throughout the year.

The VWS has provided thousands of hours of fire duty to the TMNP and other landowners at no charge, and will continue to do so as a sign of their commitment to assisting the citizens of Cape Town with the saving of lives and property, and the conservation of the Fynbos.

A new branch of the VWS was inaugurated in Jonkershoek, Stellenbosch in 2009. It provides volunteer firefighting services to CapeNature in the Jonkershoek, Kogelberg, Hottentots Holland and Limietberg nature reserves, an area of some 290 000 ha of montane fynbos. Since 2009 two more stations have been added to the group, South Peninsula (2012) and Grabouw (2015). There are currently a around 220 active volunteers within this highly organised non-profit organisation.
