= Signal Hill (Cape Town) =

Hill in Cape Town

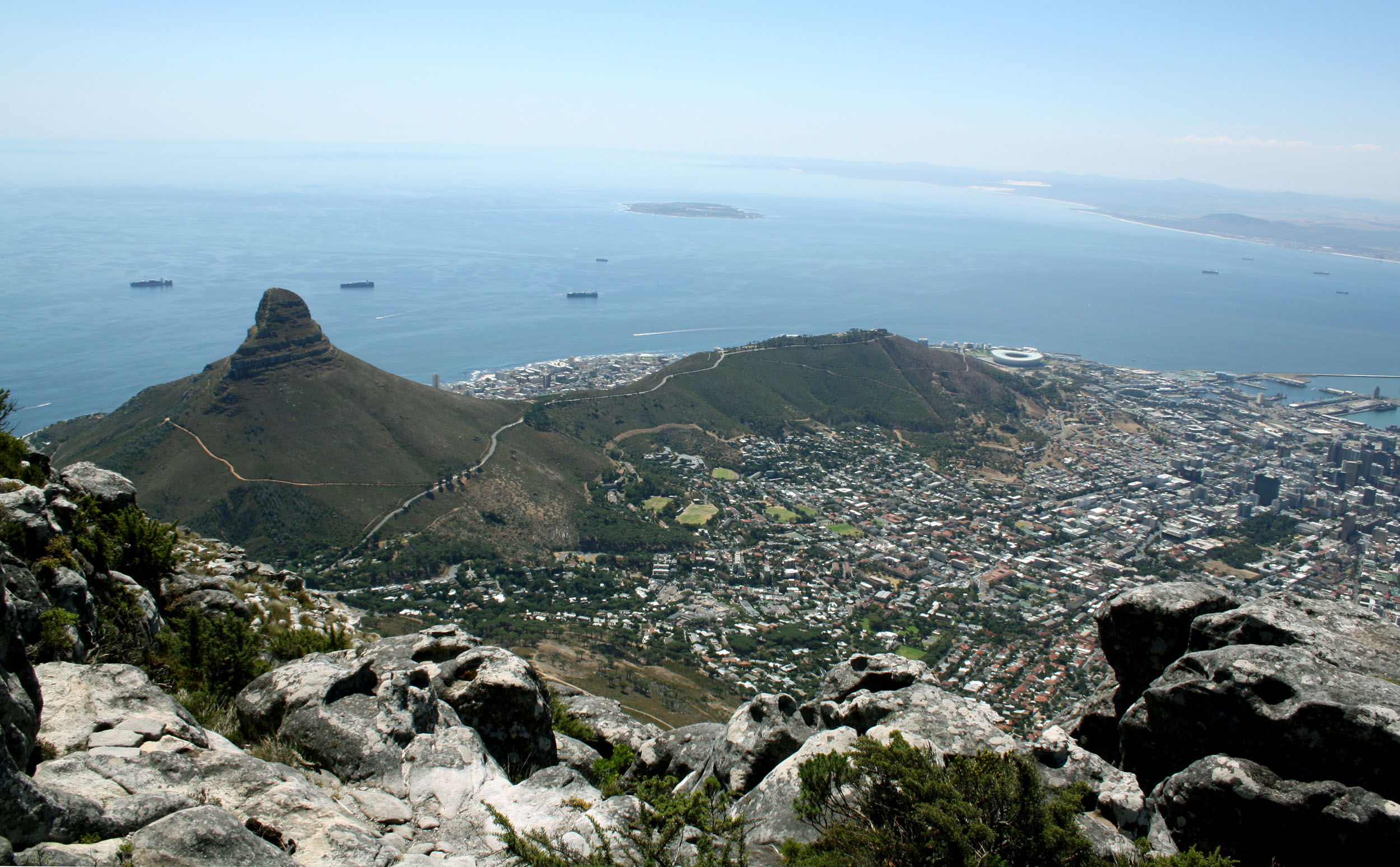
- Lion's Head and Signal Hill from the summit of Table Mountain with Robben Island in Table Bay.

Highest point
- Elevation: 350 m (1,150 ft)
- Coordinates: 33°55′4″S 18°24′10″E

Geography
- Location: Western Cape, South Africa

Geology
- Rock age: Late Precambrian

Climbing
- Easiest route: Signal Hill Rd

Signal Hill (Afrikaans: Seinheuwel), or Lion's Rump, is a landmark flat-topped hill located in Cape Town, next to Lion's Head and Table Mountain.

The hill was also known as "The Lion's Flank", a term now obsolete. Together with Lion's Head, Signal Hill looks like a lion sphinx.

== Signals ==
Signal flags were used to communicate weather warnings as well as anchoring instructions to visiting ships in order to ensure that they prepared adequately for stormy weather while in the bay. Similarly, ships could use flags to signal for assistance if, for example, an anchor line parted during a storm.

It is known for the Noon Gun that is operated there by the South African Navy and South African Astronomical Observatory. In 1836, a time ball was set up at the Cape Town observatory, however it was not visible to ships in the harbour, so a second time ball was erected on Signal Hill in order to relay the precise moment of 1pm Cape Mean Time. In this way ships in the bay were able to check their marine chronometers. The daily practice of dropping of the ball continued until 1934, when it was made redundant by radio signals.

The guns on Signal Hill were used to notify the public when a ship was in trouble and there was a possibility of casualties on the coast near Cape Town. Three guns would be fired from Chavonnes Battery, followed by a single gun in answer from Imhoff Battery.

== Structures ==
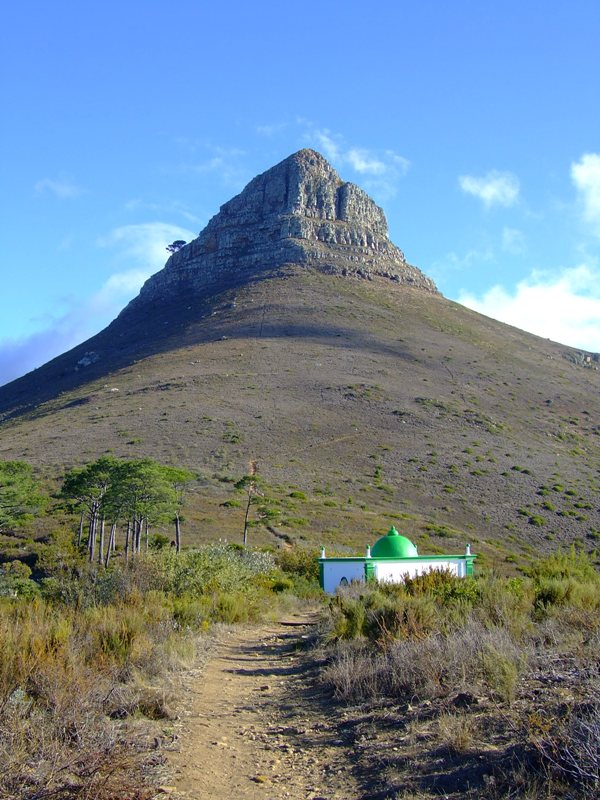
A view of the kramat (tomb for a Muslim) towards Lion's Head from the Signal Hill hiking trail

There is a road to the summit and that vantage point provides views over the Cape Town city centre and Atlantic Seaboard and surroundings, including at dawn and sunset. Along Signal Hill Road is the Appleton Scout Camp site, operated by Scouts South Africa.

There are several tombs, or kramats, on the hill for Muslim missionaries and religious leaders. The most conspicuous one, a white square building with a green dome, is for the sheikh Mohamed Hassen Ghaibie (Shah al-Qadri), a follower of Sheikh Yusuf. Other tombs consist of raised rectangles, decorated with satin. They are still visited by some local Muslim people.

There is a parking lot on top of Signal Hill. There are simple things to eat and mats provided for watching the sunset.

== Ecology ==
Signal Hill is one of the only places in the world where critically endangered Peninsula Shale Renosterveld vegetation can be found. Peninsula Shale Renosterveld used to be the dominant ecosystem of the Cape Town City Bowl, but was completely endemic, occurring nowhere else in the world.

Urban growth has now covered most of this ecosystem and - along with a tiny patch on Devil's Peak - Signal Hill has the only surviving sample of this vegetation in the world.

== See also ==
- Lion's Head
- Table Mountain
