= 2009 Table Mountain fire =

Large fire in and around the Table Mountain National Park in Cape Town, South Africa

Coordinates: 33°57′9″S 18°27′40″E

Table Mountain Fire
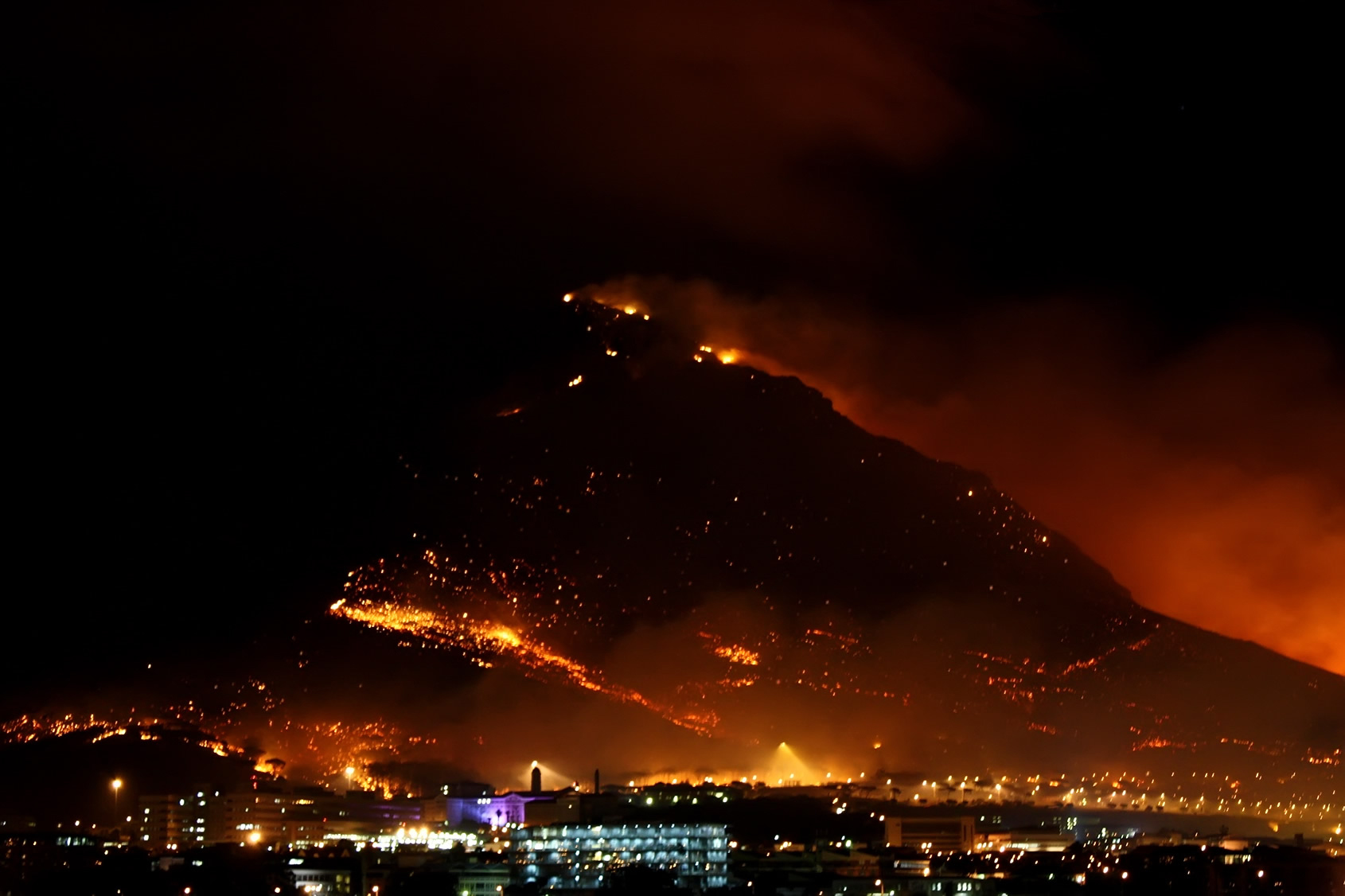
- View of Devil's Peak from the M5 in the early hours of Wednesday, 18 March
- Date: 17 March 2009

Statistics
- Burned area: 500 ha (5.0 km^{2}; 1.9 mi^{2})

Impacts
- Deaths: 1
- Injuries: 7

The 2009 Table Mountain fire was a large fire in and around the Table Mountain National Park in Cape Town, South Africa. It broke out at approximately 20:30 on 17 March 2009 in the vicinity of Rhodes Memorial and initial fears were that the fire would spread to UCT's Upper Campus. The Table Mountain National Park quickly deployed firefighting personnel on the mountain, but the fire spread due to the strong winds. At around 23:20 on Tuesday evening, the fire started moving up Devil's Peak and by 00:00 was at the tip and making its way around the mountain to the suburbs of Tamboerskloof, Oranjezicht, Vredehoek and Gardens on the north side. The flames were engulfing the mountain and the huge amounts of smoke made it hard for rescue and fire-fighting helicopters making their way to the fire. By 00:30, people from the aforementioned areas were told to evacuate due to the strong winds pushing the fire around the mountain. By this time, Fire & Rescue Services had deployed 29 fire engines and 90 firefighters who were assisted by 45 firefighters from the South African National Parks and volunteers of Disaster Management

The day following the fire, four helicopters, including a South African National Defence Force Atlas Oryx, were called in at dawn to water-bomb the fire, and to lift a team of firefighters high onto the mountain. Table Mountain National Park Fire Manager Philip Prins said about 500 hectares (1,200 acres) of park land had been burned: some fynbos, some renosterveld, some grass, and stands of pine trees.

== Evacuations ==
Loudhailers were used to order residents of High Cape to evacuate, as well as in the aforementioned areas. The fire had originally spread from the UCT and Rhodes Memorial area to the other end of the mountain within 2 hours. Hundreds of homeowners did not know that there was a massive fire raging and were woken up and told they had only minutes to flee before the fires would reach the houses. News report indicate that no houses were burnt down.

From around 06:00 on Wednesday 18 March 2009, people were allowed to return to their properties. Houses near the top of the building lines, were covered in ash.

== Deaths and Injuries ==
Only 7 people were injured as officials were quick to respond. 2 of them sustained 3rd degree burns. The first - and thus far only - death was that of fisherman Willem Simons. He was a shareholder in the Tuna Hake Fishing Corporation. Simons died from his injuries in hospital. He and his companion were critically injured in the blaze while they were sleeping in bushes in Oranjezicht on the slopes of the mountain. His companion remained in a critical condition.

== Road Closures ==
Firetrucks were positioned along De Waal Drive and the M3, as well as near UCT. The fire reached down to the M3's hospital bend, opposite Groote Schuur Hospital, thus causing traffic officials to close the road and re-route all incoming traffic onto Mowbray Main Road. Other roads which were closed include Tafelberg Road towards the Lower Cable Car Station and Signal Hill Road.

== See also ==
- 2006 Table Mountain fire
