= 2000 Table Mountain fire =

Numerous veld fires around Cape Town, South Africa

Table Mountain Fire
- Date: 16 January - 20 January 2000
- Location: Table Mountain National Park, South Africa
- Coordinates: 33°57′9″S 18°27′40″E

Statistics
- Total fires: Over 120
- Total area: 10,000 hectares (25,000 acres)

Impacts
- Cost: USD $3 Million in firefighting costs

Map
- Location in South Africa

The 2000 Table Mountain fire was a number of large veld fires that burned in and around the Table Mountain National Park in Cape Town, South Africa from 16 January to 20 January 2000. Over 120 fires were reported to have started around the Cape metropolitan area and spread rapidly due to dry and windy conditions on 16 January 2000.

By the time the last fire was put out on 20 January 2000 over 10,000 hectares (39 mi^{2}) had been burned across the Western Cape with 8,000 hectares (31 mi^{2}) burned in the South Peninsula alone. It is estimated that fire caused around US$500 million in insurance claims alone . Over 70 houses and 200 informal dwellings were damaged or destroyed. Over 1,200 firefighters and other official and volunteer personal were involved in fighting the fire at a cost of $3 million.
