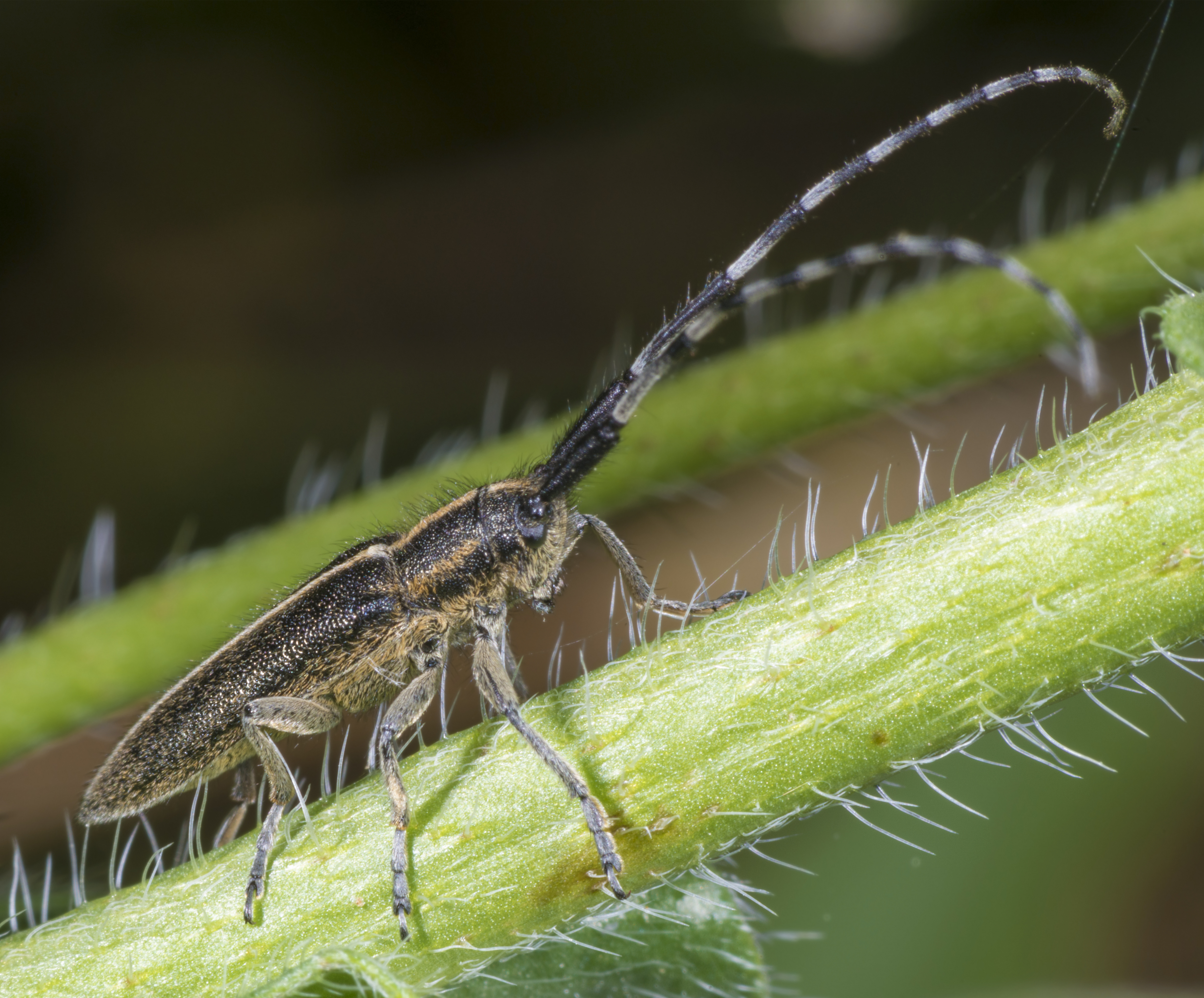
- Agapanthia cardui

Scientific classification
- Kingdom: Animalia
- Phylum: Arthropoda
- Class: Insecta
- Order: Coleoptera
- Suborder: Polyphaga
- Infraorder: Cucujiformia
- Family: Cerambycidae
- Subfamily: Lamiinae
- Tribe: Agapanthiini

= Agapanthiini =

Tribe of beetles

Agapanthiini is a tribe of longhorn beetles of the subfamily Lamiinae.

== Taxonomy ==
- Aegoprepes Pascoe, 1871
- Agapanthia Audinet-Serville, 1835
- Agapanthiola Ganglbauer, 1900
- Aliboron J. Thomson, 1864
- Amillarus Thomson, 1857
- Anandra J. Thomson, 1864
- Anauxesida Jordan, 1894
- Anauxesis Thomson, 1857
- Antennohyllisia Breuning, 1963
- Aprosopus Guérin-Méneville, 1844
- Aulaconotopsis Breuning, 1940
- Aulaconotus Thomson, 1864
- Calamobius Guerin-Ménéville, 1849
- Chionosticta Pesarini & Sabbadini, 2004
- Cleptometopus Thomson, 1864
- Coreocalamobius Hasegawa, Han & Oh, 2014
- Cribrohammus Breuning, 1966
- Cristhippopsis Breuning, 1977
- Cylindrophelipara Breuning, 1940
- Deremius Kolbe, 1894
- Ectinogramma J. Thomson, 1864
- Elongatopothyne Breuning, 1963
- Eohyllisia Breuning, 1942
- Eucomatocera White, 1846
- Falsohippopsicon Breuning, 1942
- Falsohyllisia Breuning, 1949
- Grammopsis Aurivillius, 1900
- Grammopsoides Breuning, 1940
- Granopothyne Breuning, 1959
- Helvina Thomson, 1864
- Hippocephala Aurivillius, 1920
- Hippopsicon Thomson, 1858
- Hippopsis Lepeletier & Audinet-Serville, 1825
- Hyllisia Pascoe, 1864
- Hyllisiopsis Breuning, 1956
- Hypamazso Barrion & Khan, 2003
- Ludwigia Pic, 1891
- Megacera Audinet-Serville, 1835
- Metopoplectus Gressitt, 1937
- Mimohippopsicon Breuning, 1940
- Mimohippopsis Breuning, 1940
- Mimohyllisia Breuning, 1948
- Mimonicarete Breuning, 1957
- Nemotragus Guérin-Méneville, 1844
- Neoamphion Monné, 2005
- Neocalamobius Breuning, 1943
- Pachypeza Audinet-Serville, 1835
- Paracalamobius Breuning, 1982
- Parahyllisia Breuning, 1942
- Paranandra Breuning, 1940
- Paranauxesis Breuning, 1940
- Parasmermus Breuning, 1969
- Parhippopsicon Breuning, 1942
- Parhippopsis Breuning, 1973
- Phelipara Pascoe, 1866
- Philotoceraeoides Breuning, 1957
- Philotoceraeus Fairmaire, 1896
- Pothyne Thomson, 1864
- Pseudauxa Breuning, 1966
- Pseudhippopsis Gestro, 1895
- Pseudocalamobius Kraatz, 1879
- Pseudogrammopsis Zajciw, 1960
- Pseudohyllisia Breuning, 1942
- Pseudopothyne Breuning, 1960
- Pseudosmermus Pic, 1934
- Setohyllisia Breuning, 1949
- Spalacopsis Newman, 1842
- Spinogramma Breuning, 1947
- Tetraglenes Newman, 1842
- Theophilea Pic, 1895
- Trichohippopsis Breuning, 1958
- Trichohyllisia Breuning, 1942
- Trichopothyne Breuning, 1942
- Typocaeta Thomson, 1864
- Vittatopothyne Breuning, 1968
- Zipoetes Fairmaire
- Zipoetopsis Breuning, 1950
