= A. barbatulus =

A. barbatulus may refer to:

- Acheilognathus barbatulus, a species of fish
- Amphileptus barbatulus, a species of ciliate
- Aprosopus barbatulus, a species of beetle
- Aturus barbatulus, a species of mite in the genus Aturus
