= Aegoprepes =

Scientific classification
- Kingdom: Animalia
- Phylum: Arthropoda
- Class: Insecta
- Order: Coleoptera
- Suborder: Polyphaga
- Infraorder: Cucujiformia
- Family: Cerambycidae
- Subfamily: Lamiinae
- Tribe: Agapanthiini
- Genus: Aegoprepes; Pascoe, 1871

Genus of beetles

Aegoprepes is a genus of beetles in the family Cerambycidae, containing the following species:

- Aegoprepes affinis Breuning, 1948
- Aegoprepes antennator Pascoe, 1871
