= Amillarus =

Scientific classification
- Domain: Eukaryota
- Kingdom: Animalia
- Phylum: Arthropoda
- Class: Insecta
- Order: Coleoptera
- Suborder: Polyphaga
- Infraorder: Cucujiformia
- Family: Cerambycidae
- Tribe: Agapanthiini
- Genus: Amillarus

Genus of beetles

Amillarus is a genus of beetles in the family Cerambycidae, containing the following species:

- Amillarus apicalis Thomson, 1861
- Amillarus ruficollis (Breuning, 1948)
- Amillarus secundus (Tippmann, 1951)
- Amillarus singularis (Aurivillius, 1922)
