= Pachypeza marginata =

Scientific classification
- Domain: Eukaryota
- Kingdom: Animalia
- Phylum: Arthropoda
- Class: Insecta
- Order: Coleoptera
- Suborder: Polyphaga
- Infraorder: Cucujiformia
- Family: Cerambycidae
- Genus: Pachypeza
- Species: P. marginata

Binomial name
- Pachypeza marginata Pascoe, 1888

Species of beetle

Pachypeza marginata is a species of beetle in the family Cerambycidae. It was described by Pascoe 1888.
