= Pachypeza joda =

Scientific classification
- Domain: Eukaryota
- Kingdom: Animalia
- Phylum: Arthropoda
- Class: Insecta
- Order: Coleoptera
- Suborder: Polyphaga
- Infraorder: Cucujiformia
- Family: Cerambycidae
- Genus: Pachypeza
- Species: P. joda

Binomial name
- Pachypeza joda Dillon & Dillon, 1945

Species of beetle

Pachypeza joda is a species of beetle in the family Cerambycidae. It was described by Dillon and Dillon in 1945.
