= Aulaconotus incorrugatus =

Scientific classification
- Domain: Eukaryota
- Kingdom: Animalia
- Phylum: Arthropoda
- Class: Insecta
- Order: Coleoptera
- Suborder: Polyphaga
- Infraorder: Cucujiformia
- Family: Cerambycidae
- Genus: Aulaconotus
- Species: A. incorrugatus

Binomial name
- Aulaconotus incorrugatus Gressitt, 1939

Species of beetle

Aulaconotus incorrugatus is a species of beetle in the family Cerambycidae. It was described by Gressitt in 1939.
