= Phelipara sabahensis =

Scientific classification
- Kingdom: Animalia
- Phylum: Arthropoda
- Class: Insecta
- Order: Coleoptera
- Suborder: Polyphaga
- Infraorder: Cucujiformia
- Family: Cerambycidae
- Genus: Phelipara
- Species: P. sabahensis

Binomial name
- Phelipara sabahensis Hüdepohl, 1995

Species of beetle

Phelipara sabahensis is a species of beetle in the family Cerambycidae. It was described by Hüdepohl in 1995.
