= Grammopsoides =

Scientific classification
- Kingdom: Animalia
- Phylum: Arthropoda
- Class: Insecta
- Order: Coleoptera
- Suborder: Polyphaga
- Infraorder: Cucujiformia
- Family: Cerambycidae
- Subfamily: Lamiinae
- Tribe: Agapanthiini
- Genus: Grammopsoides; Breuning, 1940

Genus of beetles

Grammopsoides is a genus of beetles in the family Cerambycidae, containing the following species:

- Grammopsoides picta Galileo & Martins, 1995
- Grammopsoides tenuicornis (Casey, 1913)
