= Grammopsoides tenuicornis =

Scientific classification
- Kingdom: Animalia
- Phylum: Arthropoda
- Class: Insecta
- Order: Coleoptera
- Suborder: Polyphaga
- Infraorder: Cucujiformia
- Family: Cerambycidae
- Genus: Grammopsoides
- Species: G. tenuicornis

Binomial name
- Grammopsoides tenuicornis (Casey, 1913)

Species of beetle

Grammopsoides tenuicornis is a species of beetle in the family Cerambycidae. It was described by Casey in 1913.
