= Parhippopsicon clarkei =

Scientific classification
- Kingdom: Animalia
- Phylum: Arthropoda
- Class: Insecta
- Order: Coleoptera
- Suborder: Polyphaga
- Infraorder: Cucujiformia
- Family: Cerambycidae
- Genus: Parhippopsicon
- Species: P. clarkei

Binomial name
- Parhippopsicon clarkei Breuning, 1976

Species of beetle

Parhippopsicon clarkei is a species of beetle in the family Cerambycidae. It was described by Breuning in 1976.
