= Hippocephala argentistriata =

Scientific classification
- Kingdom: Animalia
- Phylum: Arthropoda
- Class: Insecta
- Order: Coleoptera
- Suborder: Polyphaga
- Infraorder: Cucujiformia
- Family: Cerambycidae
- Genus: Hippocephala
- Species: H. argentistriata

Binomial name
- Hippocephala argentistriata Holzschuh, 2006

Species of beetle

Hippocephala argentistriata is a species of beetle in the family Cerambycidae. It was described by Holzschuh in 2006.
