= Philotoceraeus visendus =

Scientific classification
- Kingdom: Animalia
- Phylum: Arthropoda
- Class: Insecta
- Order: Coleoptera
- Suborder: Polyphaga
- Infraorder: Cucujiformia
- Family: Cerambycidae
- Genus: Philotoceraeus
- Species: P. visendus

Binomial name
- Philotoceraeus visendus Fairmaire, 1896

Species of beetle

Philotoceraeus visendus is a species of beetle in the family Cerambycidae. It was described by Léon Fairmaire in 1896.
