= Theophilea cylindricollis =

Scientific classification
- Kingdom: Animalia
- Phylum: Arthropoda
- Class: Insecta
- Order: Coleoptera
- Suborder: Polyphaga
- Infraorder: Cucujiformia
- Family: Cerambycidae
- Genus: Theophilea
- Species: T. cylindricollis

Binomial name
- Theophilea cylindricollis Pic, 1895

Species of beetle

Theophilea cylindricollis is a species of beetle in the family Cerambycidae. It was described by Pic in 1895.
