= Hippocephala fuscostriata =

Scientific classification
- Kingdom: Animalia
- Phylum: Arthropoda
- Class: Insecta
- Order: Coleoptera
- Suborder: Polyphaga
- Infraorder: Cucujiformia
- Family: Cerambycidae
- Genus: Hippocephala
- Species: H. fuscostriata

Binomial name
- Hippocephala fuscostriata Breuning, 1940

Species of beetle

Hippocephala fuscostriata is a species of beetle in the family Cerambycidae. It was described by Breuning in 1940. It is reported from Bhutan.
