= Pachypeza panamensis =

Scientific classification
- Domain: Eukaryota
- Kingdom: Animalia
- Phylum: Arthropoda
- Class: Insecta
- Order: Coleoptera
- Suborder: Polyphaga
- Infraorder: Cucujiformia
- Family: Cerambycidae
- Genus: Pachypeza
- Species: P. panamensis

Binomial name
- Pachypeza panamensis Giesbert, 1987

Species of beetle

Pachypeza panamensis is a species of beetle in the family Cerambycidae. It was described by P. Giesbert in 1987.
