= Pachypeza borealis =

Scientific classification
- Domain: Eukaryota
- Kingdom: Animalia
- Phylum: Arthropoda
- Class: Insecta
- Order: Coleoptera
- Suborder: Polyphaga
- Infraorder: Cucujiformia
- Family: Cerambycidae
- Genus: Pachypeza
- Species: P. borealis

Binomial name
- Pachypeza borealis Hovore & Giesbert, 1998

Species of beetle

Pachypeza borealis is a species of beetle in the family Cerambycidae. It was described by Hovore and Giesbert in 1998.
