= Neoamphion =

Scientific classification
- Domain: Eukaryota
- Kingdom: Animalia
- Phylum: Arthropoda
- Class: Insecta
- Order: Coleoptera
- Suborder: Polyphaga
- Infraorder: Cucujiformia
- Family: Cerambycidae
- Tribe: Agapanthiini
- Genus: Neoamphion; Monné, 2005

Synonyms
- Amphion Reiche, 1839 (Preocc.)

Genus of beetles

Neoamphion is a genus of beetles in the family Cerambycidae, containing the following species:

- Neoamphion triangulifer (Aurivillius, 1908)
- Neoamphion vittatus (Reiche, 1839)
