= Trichopothyne =

Scientific classification
- Kingdom: Animalia
- Phylum: Arthropoda
- Class: Insecta
- Order: Coleoptera
- Suborder: Polyphaga
- Infraorder: Cucujiformia
- Family: Cerambycidae
- Tribe: Agapanthiini
- Genus: Trichopothyne

Genus of beetles

Trichopothyne is a genus of beetles in the family Cerambycidae, containing the following species:

- Trichopothyne hindostani Breuning, 1950
- Trichopothyne rondoni Breuning, 1964
- Trichopothyne strandiella Breuning, 1942
