= Hippocephala guangdongensis =

Scientific classification
- Kingdom: Animalia
- Phylum: Arthropoda
- Class: Insecta
- Order: Coleoptera
- Suborder: Polyphaga
- Infraorder: Cucujiformia
- Family: Cerambycidae
- Genus: Hippocephala
- Species: H. guangdongensis

Binomial name
- Hippocephala guangdongensis Hua, 1991

Species of beetle

Hippocephala guangdongensis is a species of beetle in the family Cerambycidae. It was described by Hua in 1991.
