= Deremius leptus =

Scientific classification
- Kingdom: Animalia
- Phylum: Arthropoda
- Class: Insecta
- Order: Coleoptera
- Suborder: Polyphaga
- Infraorder: Cucujiformia
- Family: Cerambycidae
- Genus: Deremius
- Species: D. leptus

Binomial name
- Deremius leptus Kolbe, 1894

Species of beetle

Deremius leptus is a species of beetle in the family Cerambycidae. It was described by Kolbe in 1894.
