= Metopoplectus similaris =

Scientific classification
- Kingdom: Animalia
- Phylum: Arthropoda
- Class: Insecta
- Order: Coleoptera
- Suborder: Polyphaga
- Infraorder: Cucujiformia
- Family: Cerambycidae
- Genus: Metopoplectus
- Species: M. similaris

Binomial name
- Metopoplectus similaris Gressitt, 1945

Species of beetle

Metopoplectus similaris is a species of beetle in the family Cerambycidae. It was first described by Gressitt in 1945.
