= Grammopsoides picta =

Scientific classification
- Kingdom: Animalia
- Phylum: Arthropoda
- Class: Insecta
- Order: Coleoptera
- Suborder: Polyphaga
- Infraorder: Cucujiformia
- Family: Cerambycidae
- Genus: Grammopsoides
- Species: G. picta

Binomial name
- Grammopsoides picta Galileo & Martins, 1995

Species of beetle

Grammopsoides picta is a species of beetle in the family Cerambycidae. It was described by Galileo and Martins in 1995.
