= Anandra albomarginata =

Scientific classification
- Kingdom: Animalia
- Phylum: Arthropoda
- Class: Insecta
- Order: Coleoptera
- Suborder: Polyphaga
- Infraorder: Cucujiformia
- Family: Cerambycidae
- Genus: Anandra
- Species: A. albomarginata

Binomial name
- Anandra albomarginata (Pic, 1927)

Species of beetle

Anandra albomarginata is a species of beetle in the family Cerambycidae. It was described by Maurice Pic in 1927.
