= Amillarus ruficollis =

Scientific classification
- Kingdom: Animalia
- Phylum: Arthropoda
- Class: Insecta
- Order: Coleoptera
- Suborder: Polyphaga
- Infraorder: Cucujiformia
- Family: Cerambycidae
- Genus: Amillarus
- Species: A. ruficollis

Binomial name
- Amillarus ruficollis (Breuning, 1948)

Species of beetle

Amillarus ruficollis is a species of beetle in the family Cerambycidae. It was described by Stephan von Breuning in 1948.
