= Cribrohammus fragosus =

Scientific classification
- Kingdom: Animalia
- Phylum: Arthropoda
- Class: Insecta
- Order: Coleoptera
- Suborder: Polyphaga
- Infraorder: Cucujiformia
- Family: Cerambycidae
- Genus: Cribrohammus
- Species: C. fragosus

Binomial name
- Cribrohammus fragosus Holzschuh, 1998

Species of beetle

Cribrohammus fragosus is a species of beetle in the family Cerambycidae. It was described by Holzschuh in 1998.
