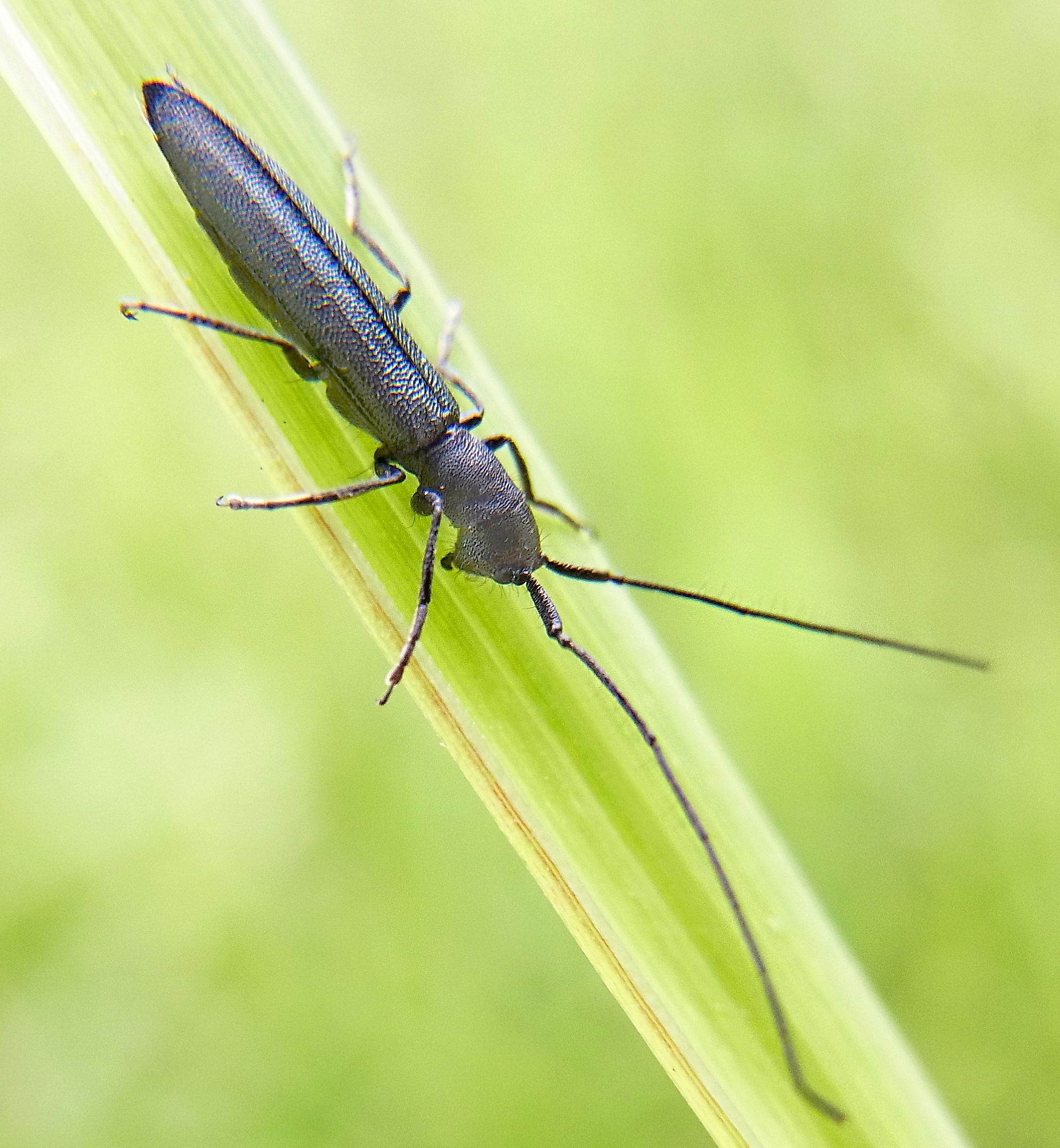

Scientific classification
- Kingdom: Animalia
- Phylum: Arthropoda
- Class: Insecta
- Order: Coleoptera
- Suborder: Polyphaga
- Infraorder: Cucujiformia
- Family: Cerambycidae
- Genus: Theophilea
- Species: T. subcylindricollis

Binomial name
- Theophilea subcylindricollis Hladil, 1988

= Theophilea subcylindricollis =

Species of beetle

Theophilea subcylindricollis is a species of beetle in the family Cerambycidae. It was described by Hladil in 1988.
