= Anandra strandi =

Scientific classification
- Kingdom: Animalia
- Phylum: Arthropoda
- Class: Insecta
- Order: Coleoptera
- Suborder: Polyphaga
- Infraorder: Cucujiformia
- Family: Cerambycidae
- Genus: Anandra
- Species: A. strandi

Binomial name
- Anandra strandi Breuning, 1940

Species of beetle

Anandra strandi is a species of beetle in the family Cerambycidae. It was described by Stephan von Breuning in 1940.
