= Trichohippopsis unicolor =

Scientific classification
- Domain: Eukaryota
- Kingdom: Animalia
- Phylum: Arthropoda
- Class: Insecta
- Order: Coleoptera
- Suborder: Polyphaga
- Infraorder: Cucujiformia
- Family: Cerambycidae
- Genus: Trichohippopsis
- Species: T. unicolor

Binomial name
- Trichohippopsis unicolor Galileo & Martins, 2007

Species of beetle

Trichohippopsis unicolor is a species of beetle in the family Cerambycidae. It was described by Galileo and Martins in 2007.
