= Megacera =

Scientific classification
- Kingdom: Animalia
- Phylum: Arthropoda
- Class: Insecta
- Order: Coleoptera
- Suborder: Polyphaga
- Infraorder: Cucujiformia
- Family: Cerambycidae
- Subfamily: Lamiinae
- Tribe: Agapanthiini
- Genus: Megacera; Audinet-Serville, 1835

Genus of beetles

Megacera is a genus of beetles in the family Cerambycidae, containing the following species:

- Megacera acuminata Galileo & Martins, 2006
- Megacera praelata Bates, 1866
- Megacera rigidula Bates, 1866
- Megacera vittata Audinet-Serville, 1835
