= Helvina howdenorum =

Scientific classification
- Kingdom: Animalia
- Phylum: Arthropoda
- Class: Insecta
- Order: Coleoptera
- Suborder: Polyphaga
- Infraorder: Cucujiformia
- Family: Cerambycidae
- Genus: Helvina
- Species: H. howdenorum

Binomial name
- Helvina howdenorum Hovore & Giesbert, 1998

Species of beetle

Helvina howdenorum is a species of beetle in the family Cerambycidae. It was described by Hovore and Giesbert in 1998.
