= Parhippopsicon =

Scientific classification
- Kingdom: Animalia
- Phylum: Arthropoda
- Class: Insecta
- Order: Coleoptera
- Suborder: Polyphaga
- Infraorder: Cucujiformia
- Family: Cerambycidae
- Subfamily: Lamiinae
- Tribe: Agapanthiini
- Genus: Parhippopsicon; Breuning, 1942

Genus of beetles

Parhippopsicon is a genus of beetles in the family Cerambycidae, containing the following species:

- Parhippopsicon albicans Breuning, 1942
- Parhippopsicon albosuturale Breuning, 1971
- Parhippopsicon albovittatum Breuning, 1978
- Parhippopsicon clarkei Breuning, 1976
- Parhippopsicon flavicans Breuning, 1970
- Parhippopsicon vittipenne Breuning, 1970
