= Parahyllisia indica =

Scientific classification
- Kingdom: Animalia
- Phylum: Arthropoda
- Class: Insecta
- Order: Coleoptera
- Suborder: Polyphaga
- Infraorder: Cucujiformia
- Family: Cerambycidae
- Genus: Parahyllisia
- Species: P. indica

Binomial name
- Parahyllisia indica Breuning, 1974

Species of beetle

Parahyllisia indica is a species of beetle in the family Cerambycidae. It was described by Breuning in 1974.
