= Pachypeza =

Scientific classification
- Domain: Eukaryota
- Kingdom: Animalia
- Phylum: Arthropoda
- Class: Insecta
- Order: Coleoptera
- Suborder: Polyphaga
- Infraorder: Cucujiformia
- Family: Cerambycidae
- Tribe: Agapanthiini
- Genus: Pachypeza

Genus of beetles

Pachypeza is a genus of beetles in the family Cerambycidae, containing the following species:

- Pachypeza borealis Hovore & Giesbert, 1998
- Pachypeza ferruginea Martins, Galileo & de-Oliveira, 2009
- Pachypeza joda Dillon & Dillon, 1945
- Pachypeza marginata Pascoe, 1888
- Pachypeza panamensis Giesbert, 1987
- Pachypeza pennicornis (Germar, 1824)
- Pachypeza phegea Dillon & Dillon, 1945
- Pachypeza teres Pascoe, 1888
