= Zipoetes (beetle) =

Scientific classification
- Kingdom: Animalia
- Phylum: Arthropoda
- Class: Insecta
- Order: Coleoptera
- Suborder: Polyphaga
- Infraorder: Cucujiformia
- Family: Cerambycidae
- Tribe: Agapanthiini
- Genus: Zipoetes

Genus of beetles

Zipoetes is a genus of beetles in the family Cerambycidae, containing the following species:

subgenus Athyllus

- Zipoetes lineatus (Distant, 1898)

subgenus Zipoetes

- Zipoetes grisescens Fairmaire, 1897
- Zipoetes rufescens Breuning, 1940
