= Paranandra ceylonica =

Scientific classification
- Kingdom: Animalia
- Phylum: Arthropoda
- Class: Insecta
- Order: Coleoptera
- Suborder: Polyphaga
- Infraorder: Cucujiformia
- Family: Cerambycidae
- Genus: Paranandra
- Species: P. ceylonica

Binomial name
- Paranandra ceylonica Breuning, 1950

Species of beetle

Paranandra ceylonica is a species of beetle in the family Cerambycidae. It was described by Breuning in 1950.
