= Helvina lanuginosa =

Scientific classification
- Kingdom: Animalia
- Phylum: Arthropoda
- Class: Insecta
- Order: Coleoptera
- Suborder: Polyphaga
- Infraorder: Cucujiformia
- Family: Cerambycidae
- Genus: Helvina
- Species: H. lanuginosa

Binomial name
- Helvina lanuginosa (Bates, 1865)

Species of beetle

Helvina lanuginosa is a species of beetle in the family Cerambycidae. It was described by Bates in 1865.
