= Metopoplectus orientalis =

Scientific classification
- Kingdom: Animalia
- Phylum: Arthropoda
- Class: Insecta
- Order: Coleoptera
- Suborder: Polyphaga
- Infraorder: Cucujiformia
- Family: Cerambycidae
- Genus: Metopoplectus
- Species: M. orientalis

Binomial name
- Metopoplectus orientalis (Mitono, 1934)

Species of beetle

Metopoplectus orientalis is a species of beetle in the family Cerambycidae. It was described by Mitono in 1934.
