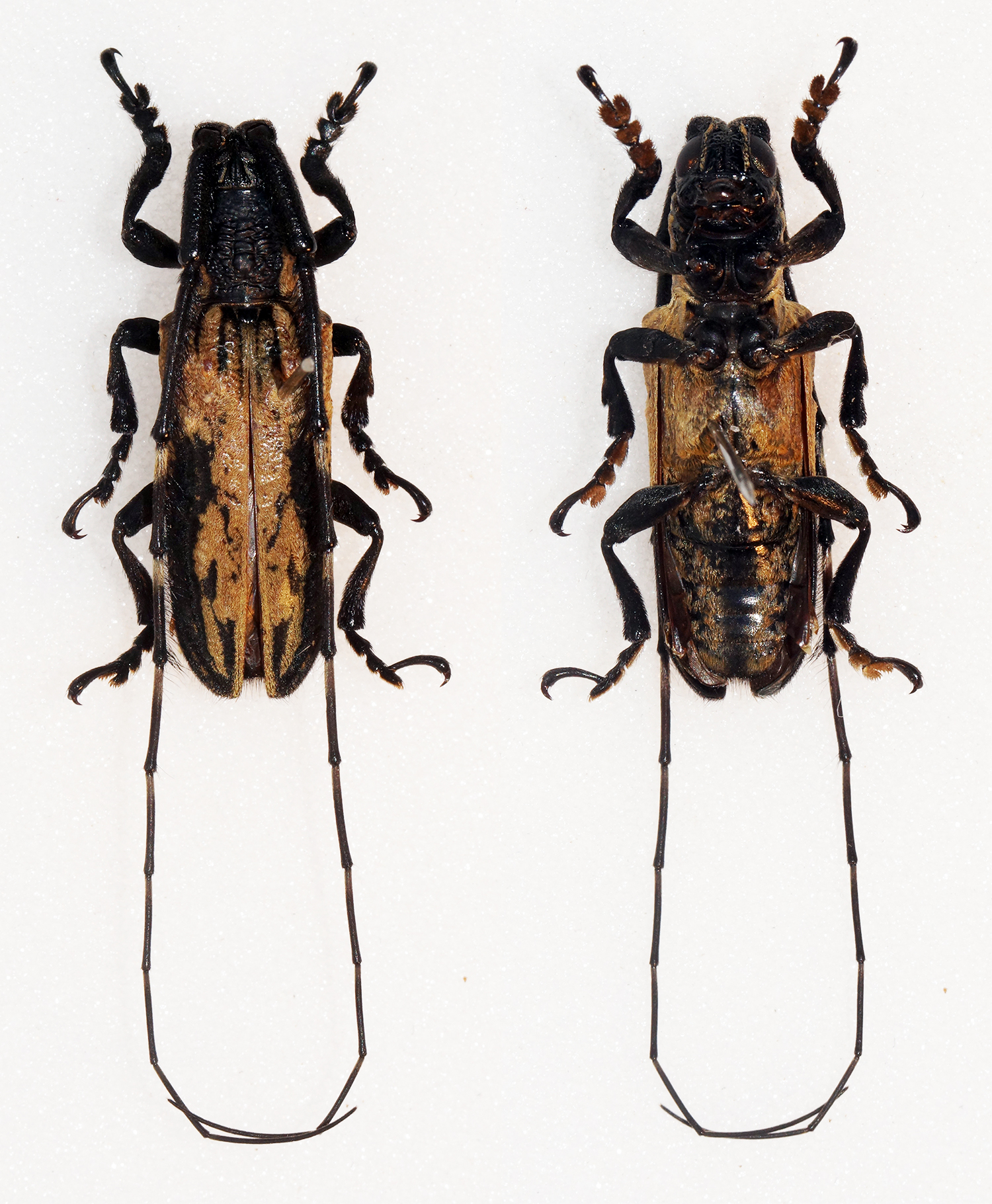

Scientific classification
- Kingdom: Animalia
- Phylum: Arthropoda
- Class: Insecta
- Order: Coleoptera
- Suborder: Polyphaga
- Infraorder: Cucujiformia
- Family: Cerambycidae
- Genus: Aulaconotus
- Species: A. atronotatus

Binomial name
- Aulaconotus atronotatus Pic, 1927

= Aulaconotus atronotatus =

Species of beetle

Aulaconotus atronotatus is a species of beetle in the family Cerambycidae. It was described by Maurice Pic in 1927.
