= Metopoplectus minor =

Scientific classification
- Kingdom: Animalia
- Phylum: Arthropoda
- Class: Insecta
- Order: Coleoptera
- Suborder: Polyphaga
- Infraorder: Cucujiformia
- Family: Cerambycidae
- Genus: Metopoplectus
- Species: M. minor

Binomial name
- Metopoplectus minor Gressitt, 1937

Species of beetle

Metopoplectus minor is a species of beetle in the family Cerambycidae. It was described by Gressitt in 1937.
