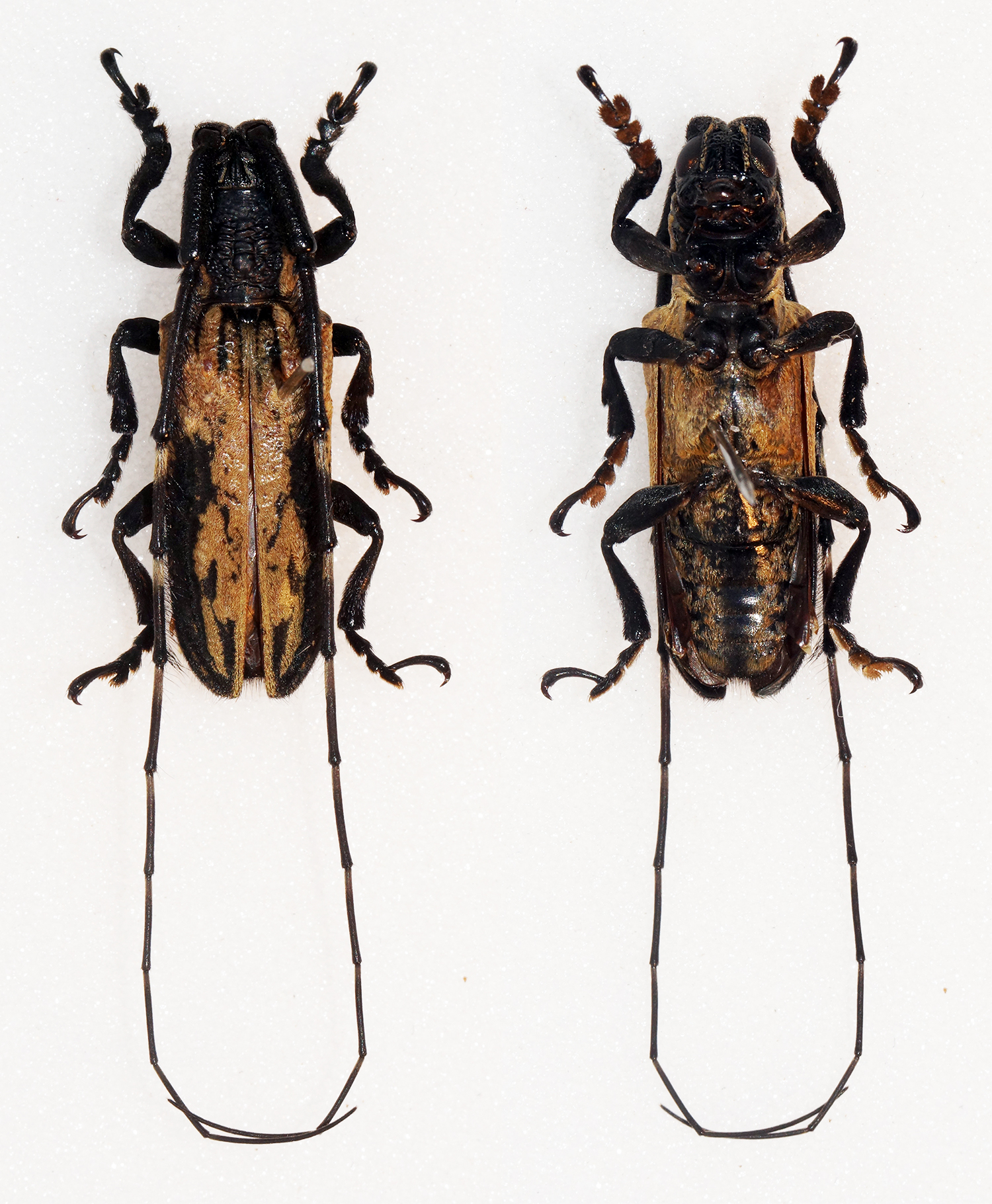
- Aulaconotus atronotatus

Scientific classification
- Domain: Eukaryota
- Kingdom: Animalia
- Phylum: Arthropoda
- Class: Insecta
- Order: Coleoptera
- Suborder: Polyphaga
- Infraorder: Cucujiformia
- Family: Cerambycidae
- Tribe: Agapanthiini
- Genus: Aulaconotus

= Aulaconotus =

Genus of beetles

Aulaconotus is a genus of beetles in the family Cerambycidae, containing the following species:

- Aulaconotus atronotatus Pic, 1927
- Aulaconotus gracilicornis Makihara & A. Saito, 1985
- Aulaconotus grammopterus Breuning, 1940
- Aulaconotus incorrugatus Gressitt, 1939
- Aulaconotus pachypezoides Thomson, 1864
- Aulaconotus satoi Hasegawa, 2003
- Aulaconotus semiaulaconotus (Hayashi, 1966)
- Aulaconotus szetschuanus Breuning, 1969
