= Aulaconotus semiaulaconotus =

Scientific classification
- Kingdom: Animalia
- Phylum: Arthropoda
- Class: Insecta
- Order: Coleoptera
- Suborder: Polyphaga
- Infraorder: Cucujiformia
- Family: Cerambycidae
- Genus: Aulaconotus
- Species: A. semiaulaconotus

Binomial name
- Aulaconotus semiaulaconotus (Hayashi, 1966)

Species of beetle

Aulaconotus semiaulaconotus is a species of beetle in the family Cerambycidae. It was described by Hayashi in 1966.
