= Pachypeza pennicornis =

Scientific classification
- Domain: Eukaryota
- Kingdom: Animalia
- Phylum: Arthropoda
- Class: Insecta
- Order: Coleoptera
- Suborder: Polyphaga
- Infraorder: Cucujiformia
- Family: Cerambycidae
- Genus: Pachypeza
- Species: P. pennicornis

Binomial name
- Pachypeza pennicornis (Germar, 1824)

Species of beetle

Pachypeza pennicornis is a species of beetle in the family Cerambycidae. It was described by Ernst Friedrich Germar in 1824.
