= Philotoceraeus descarpentriesi =

Scientific classification
- Kingdom: Animalia
- Phylum: Arthropoda
- Class: Insecta
- Order: Coleoptera
- Suborder: Polyphaga
- Infraorder: Cucujiformia
- Family: Cerambycidae
- Genus: Philotoceraeus
- Species: P. descarpentriesi

Binomial name
- Philotoceraeus descarpentriesi Breuning, 1975

Species of beetle

Philotoceraeus descarpentriesi is a species of beetle in the family Cerambycidae. It was described by Breuning in 1975.
