= Anandra capriciosa =

Scientific classification
- Domain: Eukaryota
- Kingdom: Animalia
- Phylum: Arthropoda
- Class: Insecta
- Order: Coleoptera
- Suborder: Polyphaga
- Infraorder: Cucujiformia
- Family: Cerambycidae
- Genus: Anandra
- Species: A. capriciosa

Binomial name
- Anandra capriciosa J. Thomson, 1864

Species of beetle

Anandra capriciosa is a species of beetle in the family Cerambycidae. It was described by J. Thomson in 1864.
