= Zipoetes grisescens =

Scientific classification
- Kingdom: Animalia
- Phylum: Arthropoda
- Class: Insecta
- Order: Coleoptera
- Suborder: Polyphaga
- Infraorder: Cucujiformia
- Family: Cerambycidae
- Genus: Zipoetes
- Species: Z. grisescens

Binomial name
- Zipoetes grisescens Fairmaire, 1897

Species of beetle

Zipoetes grisescens is a species of beetle in the family Cerambycidae. It was described by Fairmaire in 1897.
