= Pseudhippopsis filicornis =

Scientific classification
- Kingdom: Animalia
- Phylum: Arthropoda
- Class: Insecta
- Order: Coleoptera
- Suborder: Polyphaga
- Infraorder: Cucujiformia
- Family: Cerambycidae
- Genus: Pseudhippopsis
- Species: P. filicornis

Binomial name
- Pseudhippopsis filicornis Gestro, 1895

Species of beetle

Pseudhippopsis filicornis is a species of beetle in the family Cerambycidae. It was described by Gestro in 1895.
