= Cribrohammus =

Scientific classification
- Kingdom: Animalia
- Phylum: Arthropoda
- Class: Insecta
- Order: Coleoptera
- Suborder: Polyphaga
- Infraorder: Cucujiformia
- Family: Cerambycidae
- Tribe: Agapanthiini
- Genus: Cribrohammus; Breuning, 1966

Genus of beetles

Cribrohammus is a genus of beetles in the family Cerambycidae, containing the following species:

- Cribrohammus chinensis Breuning, 1966
- Cribrohammus fragosus Holzschuh, 1998
