= Aegoprepes antennator =

Scientific classification
- Kingdom: Animalia
- Phylum: Arthropoda
- Class: Insecta
- Order: Coleoptera
- Suborder: Polyphaga
- Infraorder: Cucujiformia
- Family: Cerambycidae
- Genus: Aegoprepes
- Species: A. antennator

Binomial name
- Aegoprepes antennator Pascoe, 1871

Species of beetle

Aegoprepes antennator is a species of beetle in the family Cerambycidae, found in Thailand, the Malayan Peninsula, and Borneo. It was described by Francis Polkinghorne Pascoe in 1871.
