= Pseudohyllisia bremeri =

Scientific classification
- Kingdom: Animalia
- Phylum: Arthropoda
- Class: Insecta
- Order: Coleoptera
- Suborder: Polyphaga
- Infraorder: Cucujiformia
- Family: Cerambycidae
- Genus: Pseudohyllisia
- Species: P. bremeri

Binomial name
- Pseudohyllisia bremeri Breuning, 1981

Species of beetle

Pseudohyllisia bremeri is a species of beetle in the family Cerambycidae. It was described by Breuning in 1981.
