= Helvina =

Scientific classification
- Kingdom: Animalia
- Phylum: Arthropoda
- Class: Insecta
- Order: Coleoptera
- Suborder: Polyphaga
- Infraorder: Cucujiformia
- Family: Cerambycidae
- Subfamily: Lamiinae
- Tribe: Agapanthiini
- Genus: Helvina; Thomson, 1864

Genus of beetles

Helvina is a genus of beetles in the family Cerambycidae, containing the following species:

- Helvina howdenorum Hovore & Giesbert, 1998
- Helvina lanuginosa (Bates, 1865)
- Helvina strandi (Breuning, 1942)
- Helvina uncinata Thomson, 1864
