= Pseudosmermus =

Scientific classification
- Kingdom: Animalia
- Phylum: Arthropoda
- Class: Insecta
- Order: Coleoptera
- Suborder: Polyphaga
- Infraorder: Cucujiformia
- Family: Cerambycidae
- Tribe: Agapanthiini
- Genus: Pseudosmermus

Genus of beetles

Pseudosmermus is a genus of beetles in the family Cerambycidae, containing the following species:

- Pseudosmermus grisescens Pic, 1934
- Pseudosmermus tonkinensis Breuning, 1969
- Pseudosmermus viridescens Breuning, 1974
