= Anandra =

Scientific classification
- Domain: Eukaryota
- Kingdom: Animalia
- Phylum: Arthropoda
- Class: Insecta
- Order: Coleoptera
- Suborder: Polyphaga
- Infraorder: Cucujiformia
- Family: Cerambycidae
- Tribe: Agapanthiini
- Genus: Anandra

Genus of beetles

Anandra is a genus of beetles in the family Cerambycidae, containing the following species:

- Anandra albomarginata (Pic, 1927)
- Anandra albovittata Breuning, 1940
- Anandra basilana Breuning, 1974
- Anandra bilineaticeps Pic, 1939
- Anandra capriciosa J. Thomson, 1864
- Anandra celebensis Breuning, 1966
- Anandra griseipennis Breuning, 1956
- Anandra laterialba Breuning, 1943
- Anandra latevittata Breuning, 1959
- Anandra pseudovittata Breuning, 1961
- Anandra strandi Breuning, 1940
