= Philotoceraeus =

Scientific classification
- Kingdom: Animalia
- Phylum: Arthropoda
- Class: Insecta
- Order: Coleoptera
- Suborder: Polyphaga
- Infraorder: Cucujiformia
- Family: Cerambycidae
- Subfamily: Lamiinae
- Tribe: Agapanthiini
- Genus: Philotoceraeus; Fairmaire, 1896

Genus of beetles

Philotoceraeus is a genus of beetles in the family Cerambycidae, containing the following species:

- Philotoceraeus descarpentriesi Breuning, 1975
- Philotoceraeus visendus Fairmaire, 1896
