= Falsohyllisia kivuensis =

Scientific classification
- Kingdom: Animalia
- Phylum: Arthropoda
- Class: Insecta
- Order: Coleoptera
- Suborder: Polyphaga
- Infraorder: Cucujiformia
- Family: Cerambycidae
- Genus: Falsohyllisia
- Species: F. kivuensis

Binomial name
- Falsohyllisia kivuensis (Breuning, 1952)

Species of beetle

Falsohyllisia kivuensis is a species of beetle in the family Cerambycidae. It was described by Breuning in 1952.
