= Zipoetopsis =

Scientific classification
- Kingdom: Animalia
- Phylum: Arthropoda
- Class: Insecta
- Order: Coleoptera
- Suborder: Polyphaga
- Infraorder: Cucujiformia
- Family: Cerambycidae
- Tribe: Agapanthiini
- Genus: Zipoetopsis

Genus of beetles

Zipoetopsis is a genus of beetles in the family Cerambycidae, containing the following species:

- Zipoetopsis dissimilis Galileo & Martins, 1995
- Zipoetopsis unicolor Breuning, 1950
