= Megacera vittata =

Scientific classification
- Kingdom: Animalia
- Phylum: Arthropoda
- Class: Insecta
- Order: Coleoptera
- Suborder: Polyphaga
- Infraorder: Cucujiformia
- Family: Cerambycidae
- Genus: Megacera
- Species: M. vittata

Binomial name
- Megacera vittata Audinet-Serville, 1835

Species of beetle

Megacera vittata is a species of beetle in the family Cerambycidae. It was described by Audinet-Serville in 1835.
