= Pseudhippopsis brunneipes =

Scientific classification
- Kingdom: Animalia
- Phylum: Arthropoda
- Clade: Pancrustacea
- Class: Insecta
- Order: Coleoptera
- Suborder: Polyphaga
- Infraorder: Cucujiformia
- Family: Cerambycidae
- Genus: Pseudhippopsis
- Species: P. brunneipes

Binomial name
- Pseudhippopsis brunneipes Aurivillius, 1914

Species of beetle

Pseudhippopsis brunneipes is a species of longhorn beetle in the family Cerambycidae. It was described by Per Olof Christopher Aurivillius in 1914.
