= Pseudhippopsis =

Scientific classification
- Kingdom: Animalia
- Phylum: Arthropoda
- Class: Insecta
- Order: Coleoptera
- Suborder: Polyphaga
- Infraorder: Cucujiformia
- Family: Cerambycidae
- Subfamily: Lamiinae
- Tribe: Agapanthiini
- Genus: Pseudhippopsis; Gestro, 1895

Genus of beetles

Pseudhippopsis is a genus of beetles in the family Cerambycidae, containing the following species:

- Pseudhippopsis albescens Breuning, 1940
- Pseudhippopsis albolateralis Breuning, 1940
- Pseudhippopsis allardi Breuning, 1958
- Pseudhippopsis brunneipes Aurivillius, 1914
- Pseudhippopsis filicornis Gestro, 1895
- Pseudhippopsis filiformis (Olivier, 1795)
- Pseudhippopsis gracilis (Fahraeus, 1872)
- Pseudhippopsis ituriensis Breuning, 1971
- Pseudhippopsis latifrons Breuning, 1940
