= Hippocephala dimorpha =

Scientific classification
- Kingdom: Animalia
- Phylum: Arthropoda
- Class: Insecta
- Order: Coleoptera
- Suborder: Polyphaga
- Infraorder: Cucujiformia
- Family: Cerambycidae
- Genus: Hippocephala
- Species: H. dimorpha

Binomial name
- Hippocephala dimorpha Gressitt, 1937

Species of beetle

Hippocephala dimorpha is a species of beetle in the family Cerambycidae. It was described by Gressitt in 1937.
