= Phelipara balteata =

Scientific classification
- Kingdom: Animalia
- Phylum: Arthropoda
- Class: Insecta
- Order: Coleoptera
- Suborder: Polyphaga
- Infraorder: Cucujiformia
- Family: Cerambycidae
- Genus: Phelipara
- Species: P. balteata

Binomial name
- Phelipara balteata Aurivillius, 1913

Species of beetle

Phelipara balteata is a species of beetle in the family Cerambycidae. It was described by Per Olof Christopher Aurivillius in 1913.
