= Eohyllisia =

Scientific classification
- Kingdom: Animalia
- Phylum: Arthropoda
- Class: Insecta
- Order: Coleoptera
- Suborder: Polyphaga
- Infraorder: Cucujiformia
- Family: Cerambycidae
- Subfamily: Lamiinae
- Tribe: Agapanthiini
- Genus: Eohyllisia; Breuning, 1942

Genus of beetles

Eohyllisia is a genus of beetles in the family Cerambycidae, containing the following species:

- Eohyllisia albolineata Breuning, 1942
- Eohyllisia allardi Breuning, 1958
- Eohyllisia luluensis Breuning, 1948
- Eohyllisia strandi Breuning, 1943
