= Falsohippopsicon =

Scientific classification
- Kingdom: Animalia
- Phylum: Arthropoda
- Class: Insecta
- Order: Coleoptera
- Suborder: Polyphaga
- Infraorder: Cucujiformia
- Family: Cerambycidae
- Subfamily: Lamiinae
- Tribe: Agapanthiini
- Genus: Falsohippopsicon; Breuning, 1942

Genus of beetles

Falsohippopsicon is a genus of beetles in the family Cerambycidae, containing the following species:

- Falsohippopsicon albosternale Breuning, 1942
- Falsohippopsicon brunneum Breuning, 1956
