= Granopothyne =

Scientific classification
- Kingdom: Animalia
- Phylum: Arthropoda
- Class: Insecta
- Order: Coleoptera
- Suborder: Polyphaga
- Infraorder: Cucujiformia
- Family: Cerambycidae
- Subfamily: Lamiinae
- Tribe: Agapanthiini
- Genus: Granopothyne; Breuning, 1959

Genus of beetles

Granopothyne is a genus of beetles in the family Cerambycidae, containing the following species:

- Granopothyne granifrons Breuning, 1959
- Granopothyne palawana Vives, 2009
