= Aprosopus =

Scientific classification
- Domain: Eukaryota
- Kingdom: Animalia
- Phylum: Arthropoda
- Class: Insecta
- Order: Coleoptera
- Suborder: Polyphaga
- Infraorder: Cucujiformia
- Family: Cerambycidae
- Tribe: Agapanthiini
- Genus: Aprosopus d’Orbigny, 1842

Genus of beetles

Aprosopus is a genus of beetles in the family Cerambycidae, first described by Alcide d'Orbigny in 1842.

== Species ==
Aprosopus contains the following species:

- Aprosopus barbatulus (Martins & Galileo, 2013)
- Aprosopus buqueti d'Orbigny, 1842
