= Pachypeza teres =

Scientific classification
- Kingdom: Animalia
- Phylum: Arthropoda
- Clade: Pancrustacea
- Class: Insecta
- Order: Coleoptera
- Suborder: Polyphaga
- Infraorder: Cucujiformia
- Family: Cerambycidae
- Genus: Pachypeza
- Species: P. teres

Binomial name
- Pachypeza teres Pascoe, 1888

Species of beetle

Pachypeza teres is a species of beetle in the family Cerambycidae. It was described by Pascoe in 1888. It is found in French Guiana, Brazil (Pará, Bahia, Minas Gerais, Espírito Santo, Rio de Janeiro, São Paulo, Paraná, Santa Catarina), Paraguay and Argentina (Misiones).
