= Pseudosmermus grisescens =

Scientific classification
- Kingdom: Animalia
- Phylum: Arthropoda
- Class: Insecta
- Order: Coleoptera
- Suborder: Polyphaga
- Infraorder: Cucujiformia
- Family: Cerambycidae
- Genus: Pseudosmermus
- Species: P. grisescens

Binomial name
- Pseudosmermus grisescens Pic, 1934

Species of beetle

Pseudosmermus grisescens is a species of beetle in the family Cerambycidae. It was described by Pic in 1934.
