= Megacera acuminata =

Scientific classification
- Kingdom: Animalia
- Phylum: Arthropoda
- Class: Insecta
- Order: Coleoptera
- Suborder: Polyphaga
- Infraorder: Cucujiformia
- Family: Cerambycidae
- Genus: Megacera
- Species: M. acuminata

Binomial name
- Megacera acuminata Galileo & Martins, 2006

Species of beetle

Megacera acuminata is a species of beetle in the family Cerambycidae. It was described by Galileo and Martins in 2006.
