= Phelipara assamana =

Scientific classification
- Kingdom: Animalia
- Phylum: Arthropoda
- Class: Insecta
- Order: Coleoptera
- Suborder: Polyphaga
- Infraorder: Cucujiformia
- Family: Cerambycidae
- Genus: Phelipara
- Species: P. assamana

Binomial name
- Phelipara assamana Breuning, 1967

Species of beetle

Phelipara assamana is a species of beetle in the family Cerambycidae. It was described by Breuning in 1967.
