= Deremius =

Scientific classification
- Kingdom: Animalia
- Phylum: Arthropoda
- Class: Insecta
- Order: Coleoptera
- Suborder: Polyphaga
- Infraorder: Cucujiformia
- Family: Cerambycidae
- Subfamily: Lamiinae
- Tribe: Agapanthiini
- Genus: Deremius; Kolbe, 1893

Genus of beetles

Deremius is a genus of beetles in the family Cerambycidae, containing the following species:

- Deremius fuscotibialis Breuning, 1981
- Deremius leptus Kolbe, 1894
- Deremius matilei Breuning, 1981
