= Pachypeza phegea =

Scientific classification
- Domain: Eukaryota
- Kingdom: Animalia
- Phylum: Arthropoda
- Class: Insecta
- Order: Coleoptera
- Suborder: Polyphaga
- Infraorder: Cucujiformia
- Family: Cerambycidae
- Genus: Pachypeza
- Species: P. phegea

Binomial name
- Pachypeza phegea Dillon & Dillon, 1945

Species of beetle

Pachypeza phegea is a species of beetle in the family Cerambycidae. It was described by Dillon and Dillon in 1945.
