= Zipoetes lineatus =

Scientific classification
- Kingdom: Animalia
- Phylum: Arthropoda
- Class: Insecta
- Order: Coleoptera
- Suborder: Polyphaga
- Infraorder: Cucujiformia
- Family: Cerambycidae
- Genus: Zipoetes
- Species: Z. lineatus

Binomial name
- Zipoetes lineatus (Distant, 1898)

Species of beetle

Zipoetes lineatus is a species of beetle in the family Cerambycidae. It was described by William Lucas Distant in 1898.
