= Pseudohyllisia =

Scientific classification
- Kingdom: Animalia
- Phylum: Arthropoda
- Class: Insecta
- Order: Coleoptera
- Suborder: Polyphaga
- Infraorder: Cucujiformia
- Family: Cerambycidae
- Tribe: Agapanthiini
- Genus: Pseudohyllisia

Genus of beetles

Pseudohyllisia is a genus of beetles in the family Cerambycidae, containing the following species:

- Pseudohyllisia bremeri Breuning, 1981
- Pseudohyllisia laosensis Breuning, 1964
- Pseudohyllisia madurensis Breuning, 1942
