= Phelipara clarior =

Scientific classification
- Kingdom: Animalia
- Phylum: Arthropoda
- Class: Insecta
- Order: Coleoptera
- Suborder: Polyphaga
- Infraorder: Cucujiformia
- Family: Cerambycidae
- Genus: Phelipara
- Species: P. clarior

Binomial name
- Phelipara clarior Breuning, 1973

Species of beetle

Phelipara clarior is a species of beetle in the family Cerambycidae. It was described by Breuning in 1973.
