= Hippocephala =

Scientific classification
- Kingdom: Animalia
- Phylum: Arthropoda
- Class: Insecta
- Order: Coleoptera
- Suborder: Polyphaga
- Infraorder: Cucujiformia
- Family: Cerambycidae
- Subfamily: Lamiinae
- Tribe: Agapanthiini
- Genus: Hippocephala; Aurivillius, 1920

Genus of beetles

Hippocephala is a genus of beetles in the family Cerambycidae, containing the following species:

subgenus Hippocephala

- Hippocephala argentistriata Holzschuh, 2006
- Hippocephala dimorpha Gressitt, 1937
- Hippocephala lineaticollis Pic, 1924
- Hippocephala lineolata Aurivillius, 1926
- Hippocephala minor Pic, 1927
- Hippocephala proxima Breuning, 1940
- Hippocephala suturalis Aurivillius, 1920

subgenus Mimosmermus

- Hippocephala albosuturalis Breuning, 1954
- Hippocephala fuscolineata Breuning, 1947
- Hippocephala fuscostriata Breuning, 1940

subgenus incertae sedis

- Hippocephala guangdongensis Hua, 1991
