= Phelipara subvittata =

Scientific classification
- Kingdom: Animalia
- Phylum: Arthropoda
- Class: Insecta
- Order: Coleoptera
- Suborder: Polyphaga
- Infraorder: Cucujiformia
- Family: Cerambycidae
- Genus: Phelipara
- Species: P. subvittata

Binomial name
- Phelipara subvittata Blair, 1933

Species of beetle

Phelipara subvittata is a species of beetle in the family Cerambycidae. It was described by Blair in 1933.
