= Megacera praelata =

Scientific classification
- Kingdom: Animalia
- Phylum: Arthropoda
- Class: Insecta
- Order: Coleoptera
- Suborder: Polyphaga
- Infraorder: Cucujiformia
- Family: Cerambycidae
- Genus: Megacera
- Species: M. praelata

Binomial name
- Megacera praelata Bates, 1866

Species of beetle

Megacera praelata is a species of beetle in the family Cerambycidae. It was described by Henry Walter Bates in 1866.
