= Spinogramma ruficollis =

Scientific classification
- Kingdom: Animalia
- Phylum: Arthropoda
- Class: Insecta
- Order: Coleoptera
- Suborder: Polyphaga
- Infraorder: Cucujiformia
- Family: Cerambycidae
- Genus: Spinogramma
- Species: S. ruficollis

Binomial name
- Spinogramma ruficollis Breuning, 1959

Species of beetle

Spinogramma ruficollis is a species of beetle in the family Cerambycidae. It was described by Breuning in 1959.
