= Falsohippopsicon albosternale =

Scientific classification
- Kingdom: Animalia
- Phylum: Arthropoda
- Class: Insecta
- Order: Coleoptera
- Suborder: Polyphaga
- Infraorder: Cucujiformia
- Family: Cerambycidae
- Genus: Falsohippopsicon
- Species: F. albosternale

Binomial name
- Falsohippopsicon albosternale Breuning, 1942

Species of beetle

Falsohippopsicon albosternale is a species of beetle in the family Cerambycidae. The species was described by Breuning in 1942.
