= Cribrohammus chinensis =

Scientific classification
- Kingdom: Animalia
- Phylum: Arthropoda
- Class: Insecta
- Order: Coleoptera
- Suborder: Polyphaga
- Infraorder: Cucujiformia
- Family: Cerambycidae
- Genus: Cribrohammus
- Species: C. chinensis

Binomial name
- Cribrohammus chinensis Breuning, 1966

Species of beetle

Cribrohammus chinensis is a species of beetle in the family Cerambycidae. It was described by Breuning in 1966.
