= Neoamphion vittatus =

Scientific classification
- Domain: Eukaryota
- Kingdom: Animalia
- Phylum: Arthropoda
- Class: Insecta
- Order: Coleoptera
- Suborder: Polyphaga
- Infraorder: Cucujiformia
- Family: Cerambycidae
- Genus: Neoamphion
- Species: N. vittatus

Binomial name
- Neoamphion vittatus (Reiche, 1839)

Species of beetle

Neoamphion vittatus is a species of beetle in the family Cerambycidae. It was described by Reiche in 1839.
