= Phelipara moringae =

Scientific classification
- Kingdom: Animalia
- Phylum: Arthropoda
- Class: Insecta
- Order: Coleoptera
- Suborder: Polyphaga
- Infraorder: Cucujiformia
- Family: Cerambycidae
- Genus: Phelipara
- Species: P. moringae

Binomial name
- Phelipara moringae (Aurivillius, 1925)

Species of beetle

Phelipara moringae is a species of beetle in the family Cerambycidae. It was described by Per Olof Christopher Aurivillius in 1925.
