= Aulaconotus gracilicornis =

Scientific classification
- Domain: Eukaryota
- Kingdom: Animalia
- Phylum: Arthropoda
- Class: Insecta
- Order: Coleoptera
- Suborder: Polyphaga
- Infraorder: Cucujiformia
- Family: Cerambycidae
- Genus: Aulaconotus
- Species: A. gracilicornis

Binomial name
- Aulaconotus gracilicornis Makihara & A. Saito, 1985

Species of beetle

Aulaconotus gracilicornis is a species of beetle in the family Cerambycidae. It was described by Makihara and A. Saito in 1985.
