= Spinogramma ochreovittata =

Scientific classification
- Kingdom: Animalia
- Phylum: Arthropoda
- Class: Insecta
- Order: Coleoptera
- Suborder: Polyphaga
- Infraorder: Cucujiformia
- Family: Cerambycidae
- Genus: Spinogramma
- Species: S. ochreovittata

Binomial name
- Spinogramma ochreovittata Breuning, 1947

Species of beetle

Spinogramma ochreovittata is a species of beetle in the family Cerambycidae. It was described by Breuning in 1947.
