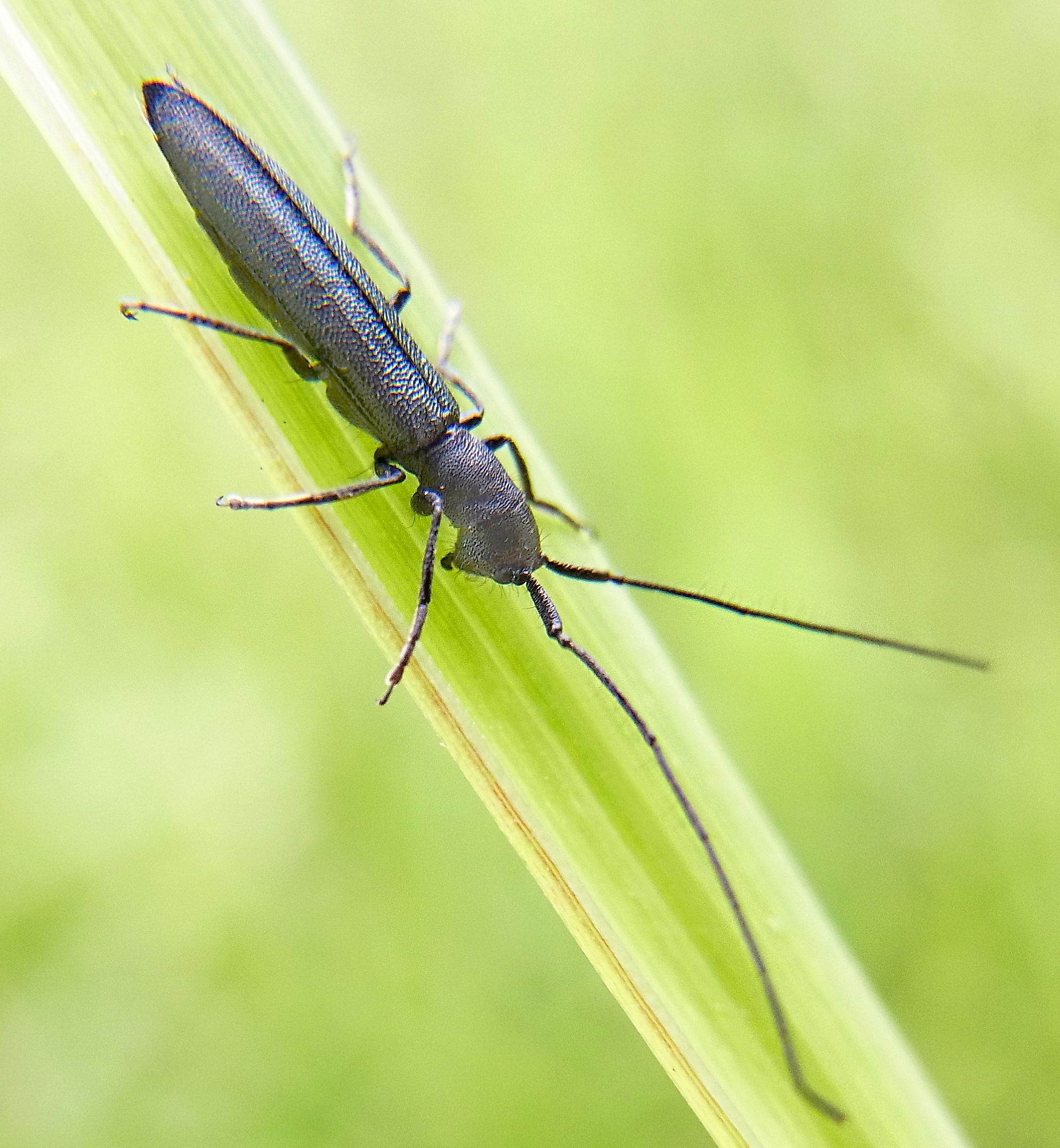
- Theophilea subcylindricollis

Scientific classification
- Kingdom: Animalia
- Phylum: Arthropoda
- Class: Insecta
- Order: Coleoptera
- Suborder: Polyphaga
- Infraorder: Cucujiformia
- Family: Cerambycidae
- Tribe: Agapanthiini
- Genus: Theophilea

= Theophilea =

Genus of beetles

Theophilea is a genus of beetles in the family Cerambycidae, containing the following species:

- Theophilea cylindricollis Pic, 1895
- Theophilea subcylindricollis Hladil, 1988
