= Metopoplectus =

Scientific classification
- Kingdom: Animalia
- Phylum: Arthropoda
- Class: Insecta
- Order: Coleoptera
- Suborder: Polyphaga
- Infraorder: Cucujiformia
- Family: Cerambycidae
- Tribe: Agapanthiini
- Genus: Metopoplectus; Gressitt, 1936

Genus of beetles

Metopoplectus is a genus of beetles in the family Cerambycidae, containing the following species:

- Metopoplectus minor Gressitt, 1937
- Metopoplectus orientalis (Mitono, 1934)
- Metopoplectus similaris Gressitt, 1945
- Metopoplectus taiwanensis Gressitt, 1936
