= Phelipara =

Scientific classification
- Kingdom: Animalia
- Phylum: Arthropoda
- Class: Insecta
- Order: Coleoptera
- Suborder: Polyphaga
- Infraorder: Cucujiformia
- Family: Cerambycidae
- Subfamily: Lamiinae
- Tribe: Agapanthiini
- Genus: Phelipara; Pascoe, 1866

Genus of beetles

Phelipara is a genus of beetles in the family Cerambycidae, containing the following species:

subgenus Balteophelipara

- Phelipara balteata Aurivillius, 1913
- Phelipara flavovittata Breuning, 1964

subgenus Laophelipara

- Phelipara laosensis Breuning, 1964

subgenus Phelipara

- Phelipara affinis Breuning, 1940
- Phelipara assamana Breuning, 1967
- Phelipara clarior Breuning, 1973
- Phelipara confusa Schwarzer, 1931
- Phelipara estanleyi Vives, 2009
- Phelipara indica (Breuning, 1940)
- Phelipara lineata (Schwarzer, 1930)
- Phelipara marmorata Pascoe, 1866
- Phelipara mindanaonis (Breuning, 1980)
- Phelipara mindorana Vives, 2009
- Phelipara minor Breuning, 1940
- Phelipara moringae (Aurivillius, 1925)
- Phelipara nebulosa (Aurivillius, 1922)
- Phelipara pseudomarmorata Breuning, 1968
- Phelipara sabahensis Hüdepohl, 1995
- Phelipara saigonensis Breuning, 1943
- Phelipara submarmorata Breuning, 1960
- Phelipara subvittata Blair, 1933
