= Parahyllisia =

Scientific classification
- Domain: Eukaryota
- Kingdom: Animalia
- Phylum: Arthropoda
- Class: Insecta
- Order: Coleoptera
- Suborder: Polyphaga
- Infraorder: Cucujiformia
- Family: Cerambycidae
- Tribe: Agapanthiini
- Genus: Parahyllisia

Genus of beetles

Parahyllisia is a genus of beetles belonging to the family Cerambycidae, containing the following species:

- Parahyllisia annamensis Breuning, 1942
- Parahyllisia indica Breuning, 1974
