= Trichohippopsis suturalis =

Scientific classification
- Domain: Eukaryota
- Kingdom: Animalia
- Phylum: Arthropoda
- Class: Insecta
- Order: Coleoptera
- Suborder: Polyphaga
- Infraorder: Cucujiformia
- Family: Cerambycidae
- Genus: Trichohippopsis
- Species: T. suturalis

Binomial name
- Trichohippopsis suturalis Martins & Carvalho, 1983

Species of beetle

Trichohippopsis suturalis is a species of beetle in the family Cerambycidae. It was described by Martins and Carvalho in 1983.
