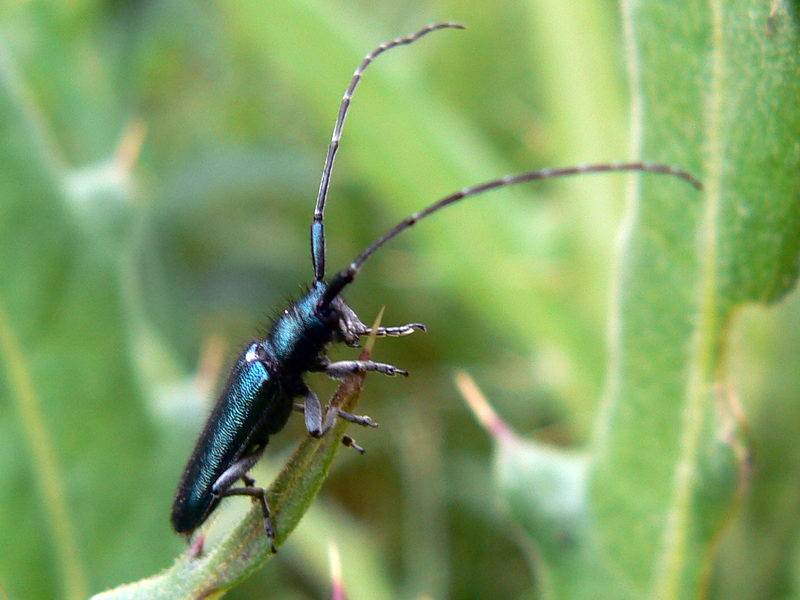

Scientific classification
- Kingdom: Animalia
- Phylum: Arthropoda
- Class: Insecta
- Order: Coleoptera
- Suborder: Polyphaga
- Infraorder: Cucujiformia
- Family: Cerambycidae
- Genus: Agapanthiola
- Species: A. leucaspis

Binomial name
- Agapanthiola leucaspis (Steven, 1817)

= Agapanthiola leucaspis =

Species of beetle

Agapanthiola leucaspis is a species of beetle in the family Cerambycidae. It was described by Steven in 1817.
