= Granopothyne palawana =

Scientific classification
- Kingdom: Animalia
- Phylum: Arthropoda
- Class: Insecta
- Order: Coleoptera
- Suborder: Polyphaga
- Infraorder: Cucujiformia
- Family: Cerambycidae
- Genus: Granopothyne
- Species: G. palawana

Binomial name
- Granopothyne palawana Vives, 2009

Species of beetle

Granopothyne palawana is a species of beetle in the family Cerambycidae. It was described by Vives in 2009.
