= Megacera rigidula =

Scientific classification
- Kingdom: Animalia
- Phylum: Arthropoda
- Class: Insecta
- Order: Coleoptera
- Suborder: Polyphaga
- Infraorder: Cucujiformia
- Family: Cerambycidae
- Genus: Megacera
- Species: M. rigidula

Binomial name
- Megacera rigidula Bates, 1866

Species of beetle

Megacera rigidula is a species of beetle in the family Cerambycidae. It was described by Bates in 1866.
