= Pseudhippopsis gracilis =

Scientific classification
- Kingdom: Animalia
- Phylum: Arthropoda
- Class: Insecta
- Order: Coleoptera
- Suborder: Polyphaga
- Infraorder: Cucujiformia
- Family: Cerambycidae
- Genus: Pseudhippopsis
- Species: P. gracilis

Binomial name
- Pseudhippopsis gracilis (Fahraeus, 1872)

Species of beetle

Pseudhippopsis gracilis is a species of beetle in the family Cerambycidae. It was described by Fahraeus in 1872.
