= Trichohippopsis gilmouri =

Scientific classification
- Kingdom: Animalia
- Phylum: Arthropoda
- Class: Insecta
- Order: Coleoptera
- Suborder: Polyphaga
- Infraorder: Cucujiformia
- Family: Cerambycidae
- Genus: Trichohippopsis
- Species: T. gilmouri

Binomial name
- Trichohippopsis gilmouri (Breuning, 1962)

Species of beetle

Trichohippopsis gilmouri is a species of beetle in the family Cerambycidae. It was described by Stephan von Breuning in 1962.
