= Amillarus secundus =

Scientific classification
- Domain: Eukaryota
- Kingdom: Animalia
- Phylum: Arthropoda
- Class: Insecta
- Order: Coleoptera
- Suborder: Polyphaga
- Infraorder: Cucujiformia
- Family: Cerambycidae
- Genus: Amillarus
- Species: A. secundus

Binomial name
- Amillarus secundus (Tippmann, 1951)

Species of beetle

Amillarus secundus is a species of beetle in the family Cerambycidae. It was described by Tippmann in 1951.
