= Anandra bilineaticeps =

Scientific classification
- Kingdom: Animalia
- Phylum: Arthropoda
- Class: Insecta
- Order: Coleoptera
- Suborder: Polyphaga
- Infraorder: Cucujiformia
- Family: Cerambycidae
- Genus: Anandra
- Species: A. bilineaticeps

Binomial name
- Anandra bilineaticeps Pic, 1939

Species of beetle

Anandra bilineaticeps is a species of beetle in the family Cerambycidae. It was described by Maurice Pic in 1939.
