= Phelipara mindorana =

Scientific classification
- Kingdom: Animalia
- Phylum: Arthropoda
- Class: Insecta
- Order: Coleoptera
- Suborder: Polyphaga
- Infraorder: Cucujiformia
- Family: Cerambycidae
- Genus: Phelipara
- Species: P. mindorana

Binomial name
- Phelipara mindorana Vives, 2009

Species of beetle

Phelipara mindorana is a species of beetle in the family Cerambycidae. It was described by Vives in 2009.
