= Grammopsis fallax =

Scientific classification
- Kingdom: Animalia
- Phylum: Arthropoda
- Class: Insecta
- Order: Coleoptera
- Suborder: Polyphaga
- Infraorder: Cucujiformia
- Family: Cerambycidae
- Genus: Grammopsis
- Species: G. fallax

Binomial name
- Grammopsis fallax (Lameere, 1893)

Species of beetle

Grammopsis fallax is a species of beetle in the family Cerambycidae. It was described by Lameere in 1893.
