= Grammopsis parvula =

Scientific classification
- Kingdom: Animalia
- Phylum: Arthropoda
- Class: Insecta
- Order: Coleoptera
- Suborder: Polyphaga
- Infraorder: Cucujiformia
- Family: Cerambycidae
- Genus: Grammopsis
- Species: G. parvula

Binomial name
- Grammopsis parvula (Newman, 1840)

Species of beetle

Grammopsis parvula is a species of beetle in the family Cerambycidae. It was described by Newman in 1840.
