= Spinogramma =

Scientific classification
- Kingdom: Animalia
- Phylum: Arthropoda
- Class: Insecta
- Order: Coleoptera
- Suborder: Polyphaga
- Infraorder: Cucujiformia
- Family: Cerambycidae
- Tribe: Agapanthiini
- Genus: Spinogramma

Genus of beetles

Spinogramma is a genus of beetles in the family Cerambycidae, containing the following species:

- Spinogramma ochreovittata Breuning, 1947
- Spinogramma ruficollis Breuning, 1959
