= Trichohyllisia strandi =

Scientific classification
- Kingdom: Animalia
- Phylum: Arthropoda
- Class: Insecta
- Order: Coleoptera
- Suborder: Polyphaga
- Infraorder: Cucujiformia
- Family: Cerambycidae
- Genus: Trichohyllisia
- Species: T. strandi

Binomial name
- Trichohyllisia strandi Breuning, 1942

Species of beetle

Trichohyllisia strandi is a species of beetle in the family Cerambycidae. It was described by Breuning in 1942.
