= Anandra pseudovittata =

Scientific classification
- Kingdom: Animalia
- Phylum: Arthropoda
- Class: Insecta
- Order: Coleoptera
- Suborder: Polyphaga
- Infraorder: Cucujiformia
- Family: Cerambycidae
- Genus: Anandra
- Species: A. pseudovittata

Binomial name
- Anandra pseudovittata Breuning, 1961

Species of beetle

Anandra pseudovittata is a species of beetle in the family Cerambycidae. It was described by Breuning in 1961.
