= Granopothyne granifrons =

Scientific classification
- Kingdom: Animalia
- Phylum: Arthropoda
- Class: Insecta
- Order: Coleoptera
- Suborder: Polyphaga
- Infraorder: Cucujiformia
- Family: Cerambycidae
- Genus: Granopothyne
- Species: G. granifrons

Binomial name
- Granopothyne granifrons Breuning, 1959

Species of beetle

Granopothyne granifrons is a species of beetle in the family Cerambycidae. It was described by Breuning in 1959.
