= Parhippopsicon albosuturale =

Scientific classification
- Kingdom: Animalia
- Phylum: Arthropoda
- Class: Insecta
- Order: Coleoptera
- Suborder: Polyphaga
- Infraorder: Cucujiformia
- Family: Cerambycidae
- Genus: Parhippopsicon
- Species: P. albosuturale

Binomial name
- Parhippopsicon albosuturale Breuning, 1971

Synonyms
- Hyllisia leucosuturata m. multialbovittata

Species of beetle

Parhippopsicon albosuturale is a species of beetle in the family Cerambycidae. It was described by Stephan von Breuning in 1971. The species was first described from the area of Skukuza, Kruger National Park, South Africa in 1971. Its synonym Hyllisia leucosuturata m. multialbovittata was named 10 years later from the Pongola area in the Transvaal.
