= Phelipara pseudomarmorata =

Scientific classification
- Kingdom: Animalia
- Phylum: Arthropoda
- Class: Insecta
- Order: Coleoptera
- Suborder: Polyphaga
- Infraorder: Cucujiformia
- Family: Cerambycidae
- Genus: Phelipara
- Species: P. pseudomarmorata

Binomial name
- Phelipara pseudomarmorata Breuning, 1968

Species of beetle

Phelipara pseudomarmorata is a species of beetle in the family Cerambycidae. It was described by Breuning in 1968.
