= Grammopsis =

Scientific classification
- Kingdom: Animalia
- Phylum: Arthropoda
- Class: Insecta
- Order: Coleoptera
- Suborder: Polyphaga
- Infraorder: Cucujiformia
- Family: Cerambycidae
- Subfamily: Lamiinae
- Tribe: Agapanthiini
- Genus: Grammopsis; Aurivillius, 1900

Genus of beetles

Grammopsis is a genus of beetles in the family Cerambycidae, containing the following species:

- Grammopsis clavigera (Bates, 1866)
- Grammopsis fallax (Lameere, 1893)
- Grammopsis parvula (Newman, 1840)
- Grammopsis simoni (Lameere, 1893)
