= Phelipara lineata =

Scientific classification
- Kingdom: Animalia
- Phylum: Arthropoda
- Class: Insecta
- Order: Coleoptera
- Suborder: Polyphaga
- Infraorder: Cucujiformia
- Family: Cerambycidae
- Genus: Phelipara
- Species: P. lineata

Binomial name
- Phelipara lineata (Schwarzer, 1930)

Species of beetle

Phelipara lineata is a species of beetle in the family Cerambycidae. It was described by Schwarzer in 1930.
