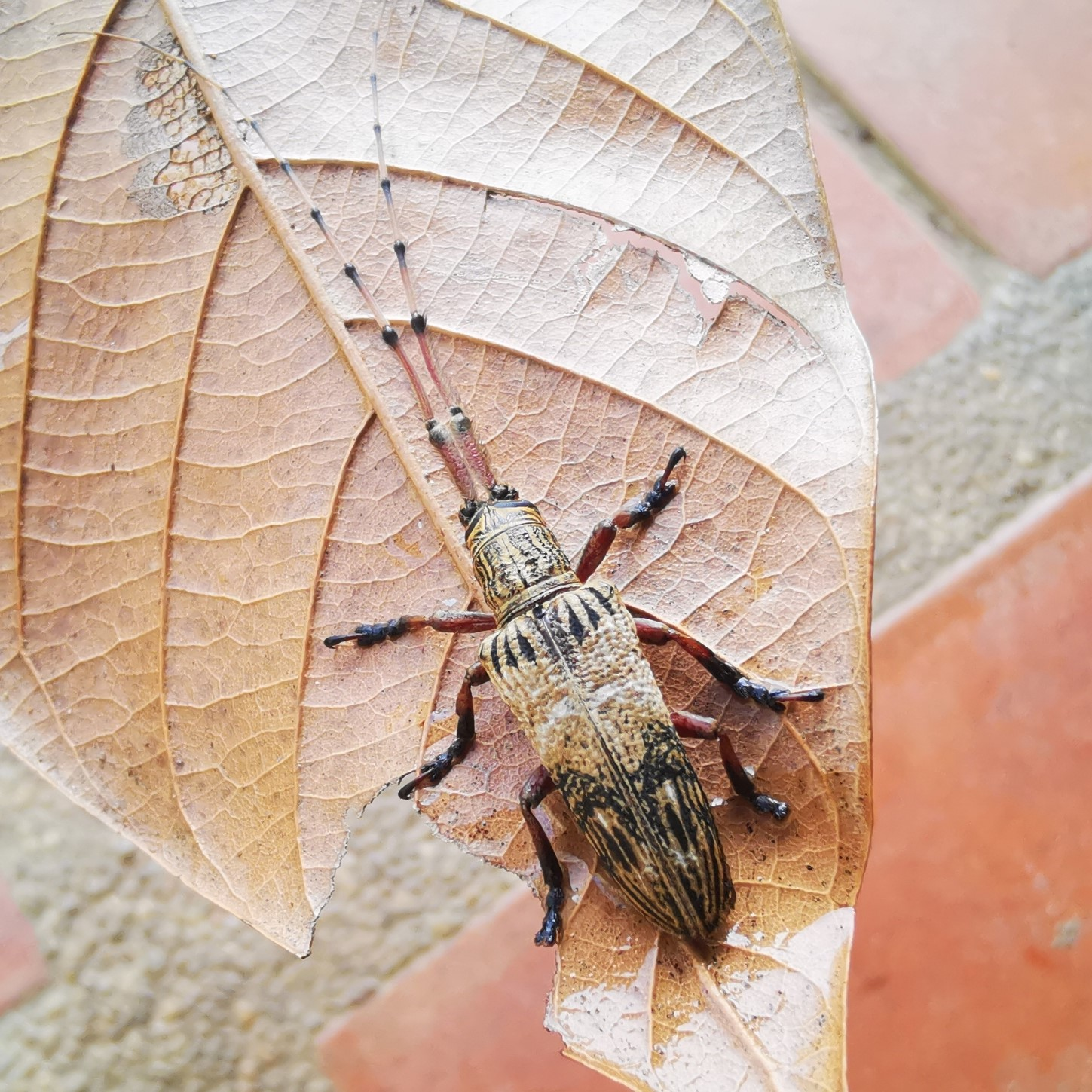

Scientific classification
- Domain: Eukaryota
- Kingdom: Animalia
- Phylum: Arthropoda
- Class: Insecta
- Order: Coleoptera
- Suborder: Polyphaga
- Infraorder: Cucujiformia
- Family: Cerambycidae
- Genus: Aulaconotus
- Species: A. satoi

Binomial name
- Aulaconotus satoi Hasegawa, 2003

= Aulaconotus satoi =

Species of beetle

Aulaconotus satoi is a species of beetle in the family Cerambycidae. It was first described by Michiaki Hasegawa in 2003.
