= Nemotragus =

Scientific classification
- Kingdom: Animalia
- Phylum: Arthropoda
- Clade: Pancrustacea
- Class: Insecta
- Order: Coleoptera
- Suborder: Polyphaga
- Infraorder: Cucujiformia
- Family: Cerambycidae
- Tribe: Agapanthiini
- Genus: Nemotragus; Guérin-Méneville, 1844
- Species: N. helvolus

Binomial name
- Nemotragus helvolus Guérin-Méneville, 1844

Genus of beetles

Nemotragus is a monotypic beetle genus in the family Cerambycidae described by Félix Édouard Guérin-Méneville in 1844. Its only species, Nemotragus helvolus, was described by the same author in the same year.
