= Agapanthiola sinae =

Scientific classification
- Kingdom: Animalia
- Phylum: Arthropoda
- Class: Insecta
- Order: Coleoptera
- Suborder: Polyphaga
- Infraorder: Cucujiformia
- Family: Cerambycidae
- Genus: Agapanthiola
- Species: A. sinae

Binomial name
- Agapanthiola sinae (Dahlgren, 1986)

Species of beetle

Agapanthiola sinae is a species of beetle in the family Cerambycidae. It was described by Dahlgren in 1986.
