= Helvina strandi =

Scientific classification
- Kingdom: Animalia
- Phylum: Arthropoda
- Class: Insecta
- Order: Coleoptera
- Suborder: Polyphaga
- Infraorder: Cucujiformia
- Family: Cerambycidae
- Genus: Helvina
- Species: H. strandi

Binomial name
- Helvina strandi (Breuning, 1942)

Species of beetle

Helvina strandi is a species of beetle in the family Cerambycidae. It was described by Breuning in 1942.
