= Hippocephala minor =

Scientific classification
- Kingdom: Animalia
- Phylum: Arthropoda
- Class: Insecta
- Order: Coleoptera
- Suborder: Polyphaga
- Infraorder: Cucujiformia
- Family: Cerambycidae
- Genus: Hippocephala
- Species: H. minor

Binomial name
- Hippocephala minor Pic, 1927

Species of beetle

Hippocephala minor is a species of beetle in the family Cerambycidae. It was described by Pic in 1927.
