= Paranandra =

Scientific classification
- Kingdom: Animalia
- Phylum: Arthropoda
- Class: Insecta
- Order: Coleoptera
- Suborder: Polyphaga
- Infraorder: Cucujiformia
- Family: Cerambycidae
- Subfamily: Lamiinae
- Tribe: Agapanthiini
- Genus: Paranandra; Breuning, 1940

Genus of beetles

Paranandra is a genus of beetles in the family Cerambycidae, containing the following species:

- Paranandra aletretioides Breuning, 1940
- Paranandra andamanensis Breuning, 1940
- Paranandra ceylonica Breuning, 1950
- Paranandra interrupta Breuning, 1948
- Paranandra keyensis Breuning, 1982
- Paranandra laosensis Breuning, 1942
- Paranandra plicicollis Breuning, 1940
- Paranandra strandiella Breuning, 1940
- Paranandra vittula (Schwarzer, 1931)
