= Metopoplectus taiwanensis =

Scientific classification
- Kingdom: Animalia
- Phylum: Arthropoda
- Class: Insecta
- Order: Coleoptera
- Suborder: Polyphaga
- Infraorder: Cucujiformia
- Family: Cerambycidae
- Genus: Metopoplectus
- Species: M. taiwanensis

Binomial name
- Metopoplectus taiwanensis Gressitt, 1936

Species of beetle

Metopoplectus taiwanensis is a species of beetle in the Cerambycidae family. It was described by Gressitt in 1936.
