= Philotoceraeoides =

Scientific classification
- Kingdom: Animalia
- Phylum: Arthropoda
- Class: Insecta
- Order: Coleoptera
- Suborder: Polyphaga
- Infraorder: Cucujiformia
- Family: Cerambycidae
- Subfamily: Lamiinae
- Tribe: Agapanthiini
- Genus: Philotoceraeoides; Breuning, 1957

Genus of beetles

Philotoceraeoides is a genus of beetles in the family Cerambycidae, containing the following species:

- Philotoceraeoides albulus Breuning, 1957
- Philotoceraeoides multilineatus Breuning, 1957
