= Pseudosmermus tonkinensis =

Scientific classification
- Kingdom: Animalia
- Phylum: Arthropoda
- Class: Insecta
- Order: Coleoptera
- Suborder: Polyphaga
- Infraorder: Cucujiformia
- Family: Cerambycidae
- Genus: Pseudosmermus
- Species: P. tonkinensis

Binomial name
- Pseudosmermus tonkinensis Breuning, 1969

Species of beetle

Pseudosmermus tonkinensis is a species of beetle in the family Cerambycidae. It was described by Breuning in 1969.
