= Trichohippopsis =

Scientific classification
- Kingdom: Animalia
- Phylum: Arthropoda
- Class: Insecta
- Order: Coleoptera
- Suborder: Polyphaga
- Infraorder: Cucujiformia
- Family: Cerambycidae
- Subfamily: Lamiinae
- Tribe: Agapanthiini
- Genus: Trichohippopsis; Breuning, 1958

Genus of beetles

Trichohippopsis is a genus of beetles in the family Cerambycidae, first described by Stephan von Breuning in 1958.

== Species ==
Trichohippopsis contains the following species:

- Trichohippopsis basilaris Botero & Santos-Silva, 2022
- Trichohippopsis birai Galileo & Santos-Silva, 2016
- Trichohippopsis gilmouri (Breuning, 1962)
- Trichohippopsis magna Martins & Carvalho, 1983
- Trichohippopsis rufula Breuning, 1958
- Trichohippopsis suturalis Martins & Carvalho, 1983
- Trichohippopsis unicolor Galileo & Martins, 2007
- Trichohippopsis vestitus Martins & Galileo, 2013
