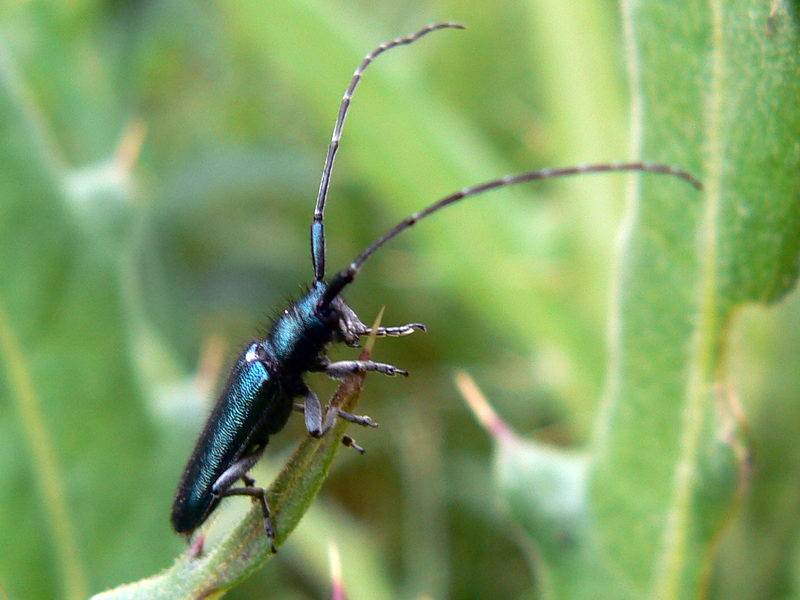
- Agapanthiola leucaspis

Scientific classification
- Kingdom: Animalia
- Phylum: Arthropoda
- Class: Insecta
- Order: Coleoptera
- Suborder: Polyphaga
- Infraorder: Cucujiformia
- Family: Cerambycidae
- Subfamily: Lamiinae
- Tribe: Agapanthiini
- Genus: Agapanthiola; Ganglbauer, 1900

= Agapanthiola =

Genus of beetles

Agapanthiola is a genus of beetles in the family Cerambycidae, containing the following species:

- Agapanthiola leucaspis (Steven, 1817)
- Agapanthiola sinae (Dahlgren, 1986)
