= Neoamphion triangulifer =

Scientific classification
- Domain: Eukaryota
- Kingdom: Animalia
- Phylum: Arthropoda
- Class: Insecta
- Order: Coleoptera
- Suborder: Polyphaga
- Infraorder: Cucujiformia
- Family: Cerambycidae
- Genus: Neoamphion
- Species: N. triangulifer

Binomial name
- Neoamphion triangulifer (Aurivillius, 1908)

Species of beetle

Neoamphion triangulifer is a species of beetle in the family Cerambycidae. It was described by Per Olof Christopher Aurivillius in 1908.
