= Trichohyllisia =

Scientific classification
- Kingdom: Animalia
- Phylum: Arthropoda
- Class: Insecta
- Order: Coleoptera
- Suborder: Polyphaga
- Infraorder: Cucujiformia
- Family: Cerambycidae
- Tribe: Agapanthiini
- Genus: Trichohyllisia

Genus of beetles

Trichohyllisia is a genus of beetles in the family Cerambycidae, containing the following species:

- Trichohyllisia allardi Breuning, 1958
- Trichohyllisia strandi Breuning, 1942
