= Grammopsis clavigera =

Scientific classification
- Kingdom: Animalia
- Phylum: Arthropoda
- Class: Insecta
- Order: Coleoptera
- Suborder: Polyphaga
- Infraorder: Cucujiformia
- Family: Cerambycidae
- Genus: Grammopsis
- Species: G. clavigera

Binomial name
- Grammopsis clavigera (Bates, 1866)

Species of beetle

Grammopsis clavigera is a species of beetle in the family Cerambycidae. It was described by Bates in 1866.
