= Pseudopothyne =

Scientific classification
- Kingdom: Animalia
- Phylum: Arthropoda
- Class: Insecta
- Order: Coleoptera
- Suborder: Polyphaga
- Infraorder: Cucujiformia
- Family: Cerambycidae
- Tribe: Agapanthiini
- Genus: Pseudopothyne

Genus of beetles

Pseudopothyne is a genus of beetles in the family Cerambycidae, containing the following species:

- Pseudopothyne luzonica Breuning, 1960
- Pseudopothyne multivittipennis Breuning, 1960
