= Trichohyllisia allardi =

Scientific classification
- Kingdom: Animalia
- Phylum: Arthropoda
- Clade: Pancrustacea
- Class: Insecta
- Order: Coleoptera
- Suborder: Polyphaga
- Infraorder: Cucujiformia
- Family: Cerambycidae
- Genus: Trichohyllisia
- Species: T. allardi

Binomial name
- Trichohyllisia allardi Stephan von Breuning, 1958

Species of beetle

Trichohyllisia allardi is a species of beetle in the family Cerambycidae. It was described by Stephan von Breuning in 1958 in the Democratic Republic of the Congo.
