= Zipoetopsis dissimilis =

Scientific classification
- Kingdom: Animalia
- Phylum: Arthropoda
- Class: Insecta
- Order: Coleoptera
- Suborder: Polyphaga
- Infraorder: Cucujiformia
- Family: Cerambycidae
- Genus: Zipoetopsis
- Species: Z. dissimilis

Binomial name
- Zipoetopsis dissimilis Galileo & Martins, 1995

Species of beetle

Zipoetopsis dissimilis is a species of beetle in the family Cerambycidae. It was described by Galileo and Martins in 1995.
