= Aulaconotus szetschuanus =

Scientific classification
- Kingdom: Animalia
- Phylum: Arthropoda
- Class: Insecta
- Order: Coleoptera
- Suborder: Polyphaga
- Infraorder: Cucujiformia
- Family: Cerambycidae
- Genus: Aulaconotus
- Species: A. szetschuanus

Binomial name
- Aulaconotus szetschuanus Breuning, 1969

Species of beetle

Aulaconotus szetschuanus is a species of beetle in the family Cerambycidae. It was described by Stephan von Breuning in 1969.
