= Hippocephala lineaticollis =

Scientific classification
- Kingdom: Animalia
- Phylum: Arthropoda
- Class: Insecta
- Order: Coleoptera
- Suborder: Polyphaga
- Infraorder: Cucujiformia
- Family: Cerambycidae
- Genus: Hippocephala
- Species: H. lineaticollis

Binomial name
- Hippocephala lineaticollis Pic, 1924

Species of beetle

Hippocephala lineaticollis is a species of beetle in the family Cerambycidae. It was described by Maurice Pic in 1924.
