= Falsohyllisia debile =

Scientific classification
- Domain: Eukaryota
- Kingdom: Animalia
- Phylum: Arthropoda
- Class: Insecta
- Order: Coleoptera
- Suborder: Polyphaga
- Infraorder: Cucujiformia
- Family: Cerambycidae
- Genus: Falsohyllisia
- Species: F. debile

Binomial name
- Falsohyllisia debile Fahraeus, 1872

Species of beetle

Falsohyllisia debile is a species of beetle in the family Cerambycidae. It was described by Fahraeus in 1872.
