= Phelipara mindanaonis =

Scientific classification
- Kingdom: Animalia
- Phylum: Arthropoda
- Class: Insecta
- Order: Coleoptera
- Suborder: Polyphaga
- Infraorder: Cucujiformia
- Family: Cerambycidae
- Genus: Phelipara
- Species: P. mindanaonis

Binomial name
- Phelipara mindanaonis (Breuning, 1980)

Species of beetle

Phelipara mindanaonis is a species of beetle in the family Cerambycidae. It was described by Breuning in 1980.
