= Aulaconotus pachypezoides =

Scientific classification
- Domain: Eukaryota
- Kingdom: Animalia
- Phylum: Arthropoda
- Class: Insecta
- Order: Coleoptera
- Suborder: Polyphaga
- Infraorder: Cucujiformia
- Family: Cerambycidae
- Genus: Aulaconotus
- Species: A. pachypezoides

Binomial name
- Aulaconotus pachypezoides Thomson, 1864

Species of beetle

Aulaconotus pachypezoides is a species of beetle in the family Cerambycidae. It was described by Thomson in 1864.
