= Helvina uncinata =

Scientific classification
- Kingdom: Animalia
- Phylum: Arthropoda
- Class: Insecta
- Order: Coleoptera
- Suborder: Polyphaga
- Infraorder: Cucujiformia
- Family: Cerambycidae
- Genus: Helvina
- Species: H. uncinata

Binomial name
- Helvina uncinata Thomson, 1864

Species of beetle

Helvina uncinata is a species of beetle in the family Cerambycidae. It was described by Thomson in 1864.
