= Deremius fuscotibialis =

Scientific classification
- Kingdom: Animalia
- Phylum: Arthropoda
- Class: Insecta
- Order: Coleoptera
- Suborder: Polyphaga
- Infraorder: Cucujiformia
- Family: Cerambycidae
- Genus: Deremius
- Species: D. fuscotibialis

Binomial name
- Deremius fuscotibialis Breuning, 1981

Species of beetle

Deremius fuscotibialis is a species of beetle in the family Cerambycidae. It was described by Breuning in 1981.
