= Falsohyllisia =

Scientific classification
- Domain: Eukaryota
- Kingdom: Animalia
- Phylum: Arthropoda
- Class: Insecta
- Order: Coleoptera
- Suborder: Polyphaga
- Infraorder: Cucujiformia
- Family: Cerambycidae
- Subfamily: Lamiinae
- Genus: Falsohyllisia

Genus of beetles

Falsohyllisia is a genus of beetles in the family Cerambycidae, containing the following species:

- Falsohyllisia debile Fahraeus, 1872
- Falsohyllisia kivuensis (Breuning, 1952)
- Falsohyllisia meridionale Hunt & Breuning, 1957
