= Parasmermus =

Scientific classification
- Kingdom: Animalia
- Phylum: Arthropoda
- Class: Insecta
- Order: Coleoptera
- Suborder: Polyphaga
- Infraorder: Cucujiformia
- Family: Cerambycidae
- Genus: Parasmermus
- Species: P. tonkinensis

Binomial name
- Parasmermus tonkinensis Breuning, 1969

Genus of beetles

Parasmermus tonkinensis is a species of beetle in the family Cerambycidae, and the only species in the genus Parasmermus. It was described by Breuning in 1969.
