= Vittatopothyne =

Scientific classification
- Kingdom: Animalia
- Phylum: Arthropoda
- Class: Insecta
- Order: Coleoptera
- Suborder: Polyphaga
- Infraorder: Cucujiformia
- Family: Cerambycidae
- Genus: Vittatopothyne
- Species: V. flavovittata

Binomial name
- Vittatopothyne flavovittata (Breuning, 1960)

Genus of beetles

Vittatopothyne flavovittata is a species of beetle in the family Cerambycidae, and the only species in the genus Vittatopothyne. It was described by Stephan von Breuning in 1960.
