= Ectinogramma =

Scientific classification
- Kingdom: Animalia
- Phylum: Arthropoda
- Class: Insecta
- Order: Coleoptera
- Suborder: Polyphaga
- Infraorder: Cucujiformia
- Family: Cerambycidae
- Genus: Ectinogramma
- Species: E. isosceloides

Binomial name
- Ectinogramma isosceloides J. Thomson, 1864

Genus of beetles

Ectinogramma isosceloides is a species of beetle in the family Cerambycidae, and the only species in the genus Ectinogramma. It was described by J. Thomson in 1864.
