= Setohyllisia =

Scientific classification
- Kingdom: Animalia
- Phylum: Arthropoda
- Class: Insecta
- Order: Coleoptera
- Suborder: Polyphaga
- Infraorder: Cucujiformia
- Family: Cerambycidae
- Genus: Setohyllisia
- Species: S. setosa

Binomial name
- Setohyllisia setosa Breuning, 1949

Genus of beetles

Setohyllisia setosa is a species of beetle in the family Cerambycidae, and the only species in the genus Setohyllisia. It was described by Stephan von Breuning in 1949.
