= Mimohippopsis =

Scientific classification
- Kingdom: Animalia
- Phylum: Arthropoda
- Class: Insecta
- Order: Coleoptera
- Suborder: Polyphaga
- Infraorder: Cucujiformia
- Family: Cerambycidae
- Genus: Mimohippopsis
- Species: M. inaequalis

Binomial name
- Mimohippopsis inaequalis Breuning, 1940

Genus of beetles

Mimohippopsis inaequalis is a species of beetle in the family Cerambycidae, and the only species in the genus Mimohippopsis. It was described by Breuning in 1940.
