= Neocalamobius =

Scientific classification
- Kingdom: Animalia
- Phylum: Arthropoda
- Class: Insecta
- Order: Coleoptera
- Suborder: Polyphaga
- Infraorder: Cucujiformia
- Family: Cerambycidae
- Genus: Neocalamobius
- Species: N. clavatus

Binomial name
- Neocalamobius clavatus Breuning, 1943

Genus of beetles

Neocalamobius clavatus is a species of beetle in the family Cerambycidae, and the only species in the genus Neocalamobius. It was described by Breuning in 1943.
