= Chionosticta =

Scientific classification
- Kingdom: Animalia
- Phylum: Arthropoda
- Class: Insecta
- Order: Coleoptera
- Suborder: Polyphaga
- Infraorder: Cucujiformia
- Family: Cerambycidae
- Genus: Chionosticta
- Species: C. niveisparsa

Binomial name
- Chionosticta niveisparsa (Holzschuh, 1981)

Genus of beetles

Chionosticta niveisparsa is a species of beetle in the family Cerambycidae, and the only species in the genus Chionosticta. It was described by Holzschuh in 1981.
