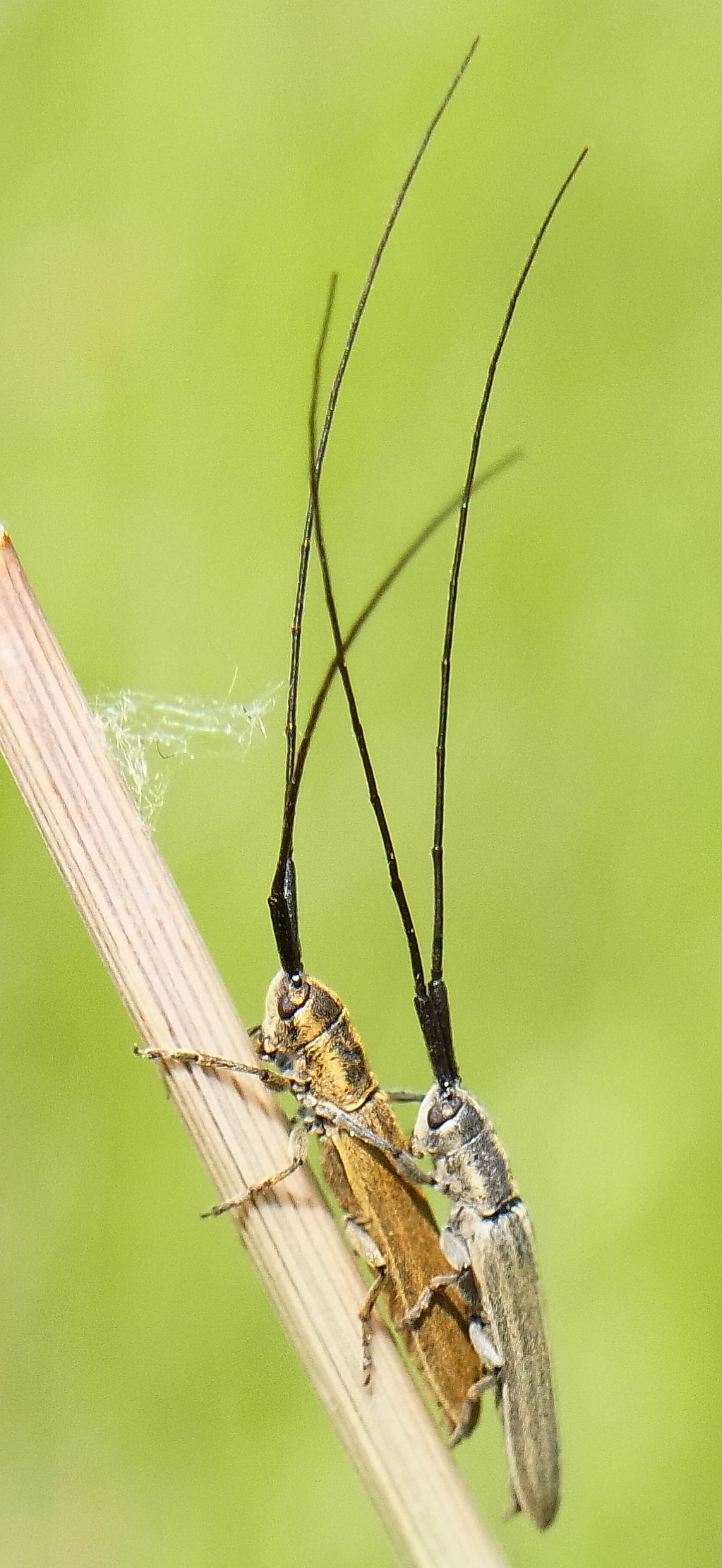

Scientific classification
- Domain: Eukaryota
- Kingdom: Animalia
- Phylum: Arthropoda
- Class: Insecta
- Order: Coleoptera
- Suborder: Polyphaga
- Infraorder: Cucujiformia
- Family: Cerambycidae
- Subfamily: Lamiinae
- Genus: Calamobius
- Species: C. filum

Binomial name
- Calamobius filum (Rossi, 1790)

= Calamobius =

Genus of beetles

Calamobius filum is a species of beetle in the family Cerambycidae, and the only species in the genus Calamobius. It was described by Rossi in 1790.
