= Hypamazso =

Scientific classification
- Kingdom: Animalia
- Phylum: Arthropoda
- Class: Insecta
- Order: Coleoptera
- Suborder: Polyphaga
- Infraorder: Cucujiformia
- Family: Cerambycidae
- Genus: Hypamazso
- Species: H. pauli

Binomial name
- Hypamazso pauli (Fairmaire, 1884)

Genus of beetles

Hypamazso pauli is a species of beetle in the family Cerambycidae, and the only species in the genus Hypamazso. It was described by Fairmaire in 1884.
