= Paracalamobius =

Scientific classification
- Kingdom: Animalia
- Phylum: Arthropoda
- Class: Insecta
- Order: Coleoptera
- Suborder: Polyphaga
- Infraorder: Cucujiformia
- Family: Cerambycidae
- Genus: Paracalamobius
- Species: P. tonkineus

Binomial name
- Paracalamobius tonkineus Breuning, 1982

Genus of beetles

Paracalamobius tonkineus is a species of beetle in the family Cerambycidae, and the only species in the genus Paracalamobius. It was described by Breuning in 1982.
