= Coreocalamobius =

Scientific classification
- Kingdom: Animalia
- Phylum: Arthropoda
- Clade: Pancrustacea
- Class: Insecta
- Order: Coleoptera
- Suborder: Polyphaga
- Infraorder: Cucujiformia
- Family: Cerambycidae
- Genus: Coreocalamobius
- Species: C. parantennatus

Binomial name
- Coreocalamobius parantennatus Hasegawa, Han & Oh, 2014

Genus of beetles

Coreocalamobius parantennatus is a species of beetle in the family Cerambycidae, and the only species in the genus Coreocalamobius. It was described by Hasegawa, Han and Oh in 2014.
