= Mimohyllisia =

Scientific classification
- Kingdom: Animalia
- Phylum: Arthropoda
- Class: Insecta
- Order: Coleoptera
- Suborder: Polyphaga
- Infraorder: Cucujiformia
- Family: Cerambycidae
- Genus: Mimohyllisia
- Species: M. tonkinensis

Binomial name
- Mimohyllisia tonkinensis Breuning, 1948

Genus of beetles

Mimohyllisia tonkinensis is a species of beetle in the family Cerambycidae, and the only species in the genus Mimohyllisia. It was described by Stephan von Breuning in 1948.
