= Cylindrophelipara =

Scientific classification
- Kingdom: Animalia
- Phylum: Arthropoda
- Class: Insecta
- Order: Coleoptera
- Suborder: Polyphaga
- Infraorder: Cucujiformia
- Family: Cerambycidae
- Genus: Cylindrophelipara
- Species: C. pulchra

Binomial name
- Cylindrophelipara pulchra Breuning, 1940

Genus of beetles

Cylindrophelipara pulchra is a species of beetle in the family Cerambycidae, and the only species in the genus Cylindrophelipara. It was described by Breuning in 1940.
