= Pseudauxa =

Scientific classification
- Kingdom: Animalia
- Phylum: Arthropoda
- Class: Insecta
- Order: Coleoptera
- Suborder: Polyphaga
- Infraorder: Cucujiformia
- Family: Cerambycidae
- Genus: Pseudauxa; Breuning, 1966
- Species: P. nigerrima

Binomial name
- Pseudauxa nigerrima Breuning, 1966

Genus of beetles

Pseudauxa is a monotypic genus of beetle in the family Cerambycidae. Its sole accepted species is Pseudauxa nigerrima. It was described by Breuning in 1966.
