= Aprosopus barbatulus =

Scientific classification
- Domain: Eukaryota
- Kingdom: Animalia
- Phylum: Arthropoda
- Class: Insecta
- Order: Coleoptera
- Suborder: Polyphaga
- Infraorder: Cucujiformia
- Family: Cerambycidae
- Genus: Aprosopus
- Species: A. barbatulus

Binomial name
- Aprosopus barbatulus (Martins & Galileo, 2013)

Synonyms
- Trichohippopsis barbatulus Martins & Galileo, 2013

Species of beetle

Aprosopus barbatulus is a species of beetle in the family Cerambycidae. It was described by Martins and Galileo in 2013.
