= Cristhippopsis =

Scientific classification
- Kingdom: Animalia
- Phylum: Arthropoda
- Class: Insecta
- Order: Coleoptera
- Suborder: Polyphaga
- Infraorder: Cucujiformia
- Family: Cerambycidae
- Genus: Cristhippopsis
- Species: C. flavovittatus

Binomial name
- Cristhippopsis flavovittatus Breuning, 1977

Genus of beetles

Cristhippopsis flavovittatus is a species of beetle in the family Cerambycidae, and the only species in the genus Cristhippopsis. It was described by Breuning in 1977.
