= A. guineensis =

A. guineensis may refer to:

- Abacetus guineensis, a ground beetle
- Acanthodactylus guineensis, the Guinea fringe-fingered lizard, found in Africa
- Acanthus guineensis, a plant found in Africa
- Allocyttus guineensis, a fish found in the Atlantic Ocean
- Alyattes guineensis, a synonym of Pterolophia guineensis, a longhorn beetle
- Anajapyx guineensis, a dipluran
- Anauxesida guineensis, a longhorn beetle
- Arctides guineensis, a slipper lobster found in the Bermuda Triangle
- Aslauga guineensis, the Guinea aslauga, a butterfly
