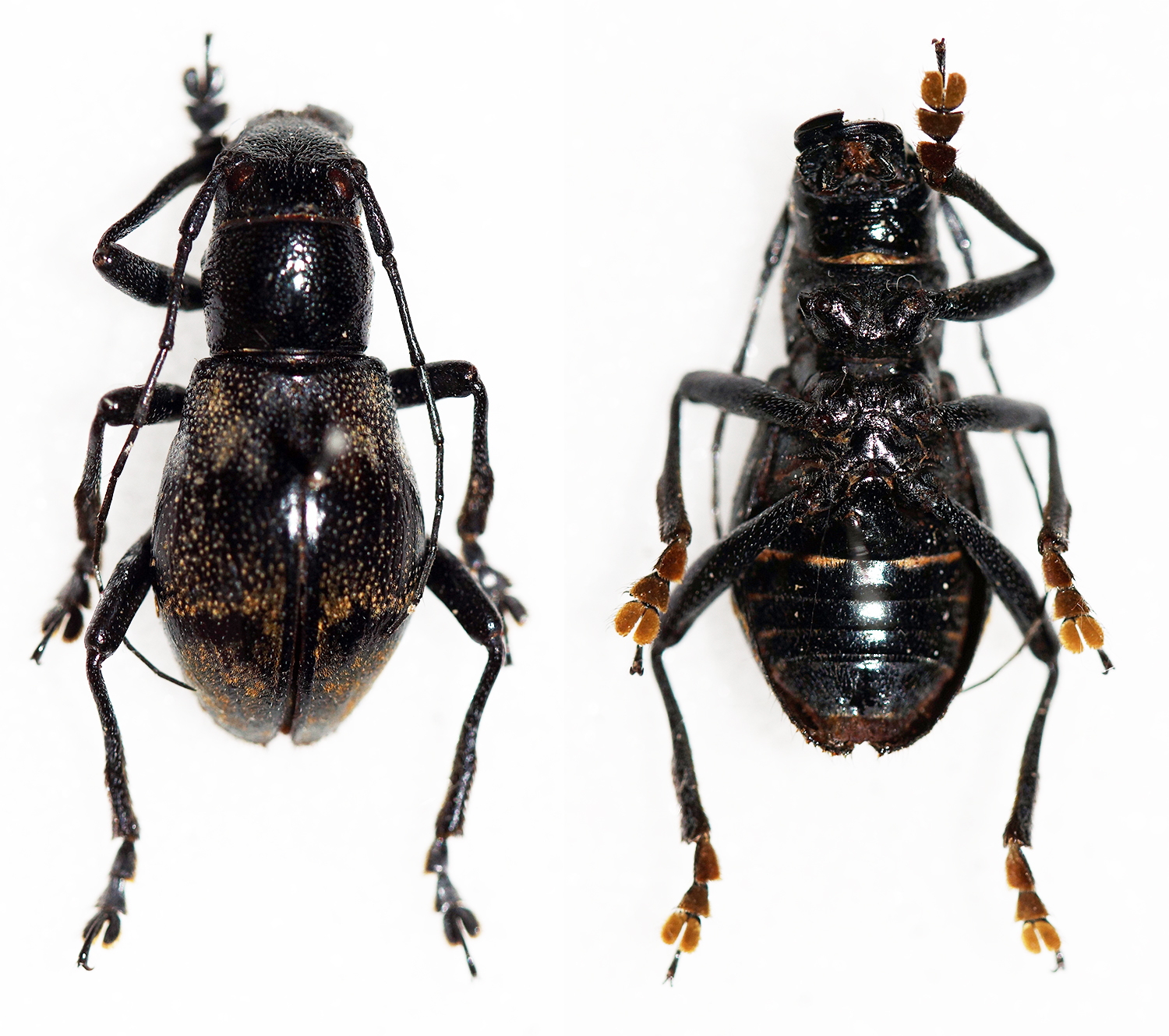
- Aprophata notha

Scientific classification
- Domain: Eukaryota
- Kingdom: Animalia
- Phylum: Arthropoda
- Class: Insecta
- Order: Coleoptera
- Suborder: Polyphaga
- Infraorder: Cucujiformia
- Family: Cerambycidae
- Tribe: Pteropliini
- Genus: Aprophata; Pascoe, 1862

= Aprophata =

Genus of beetles

Aprophata is a genus of longhorn beetles of the subfamily Lamiinae, containing the following species:

- Aprophata aurorana Vives, 2009
- Aprophata eximia (Newman, 1842)
- Aprophata eximioides Breuning, 1961
- Aprophata hieroglyphica Vives, 2009
- Aprophata nigrescens Breuning, 1973
- Aprophata notha (Newman, 1842)
- Aprophata quatuordecimmaculata Breuning, 1947
- Aprophata ruficollis Heller, 1916
- Aprophata semperi (Westwood, 1863)
- Aprophata vigintiquatuormaculata Schwarzer, 1931
