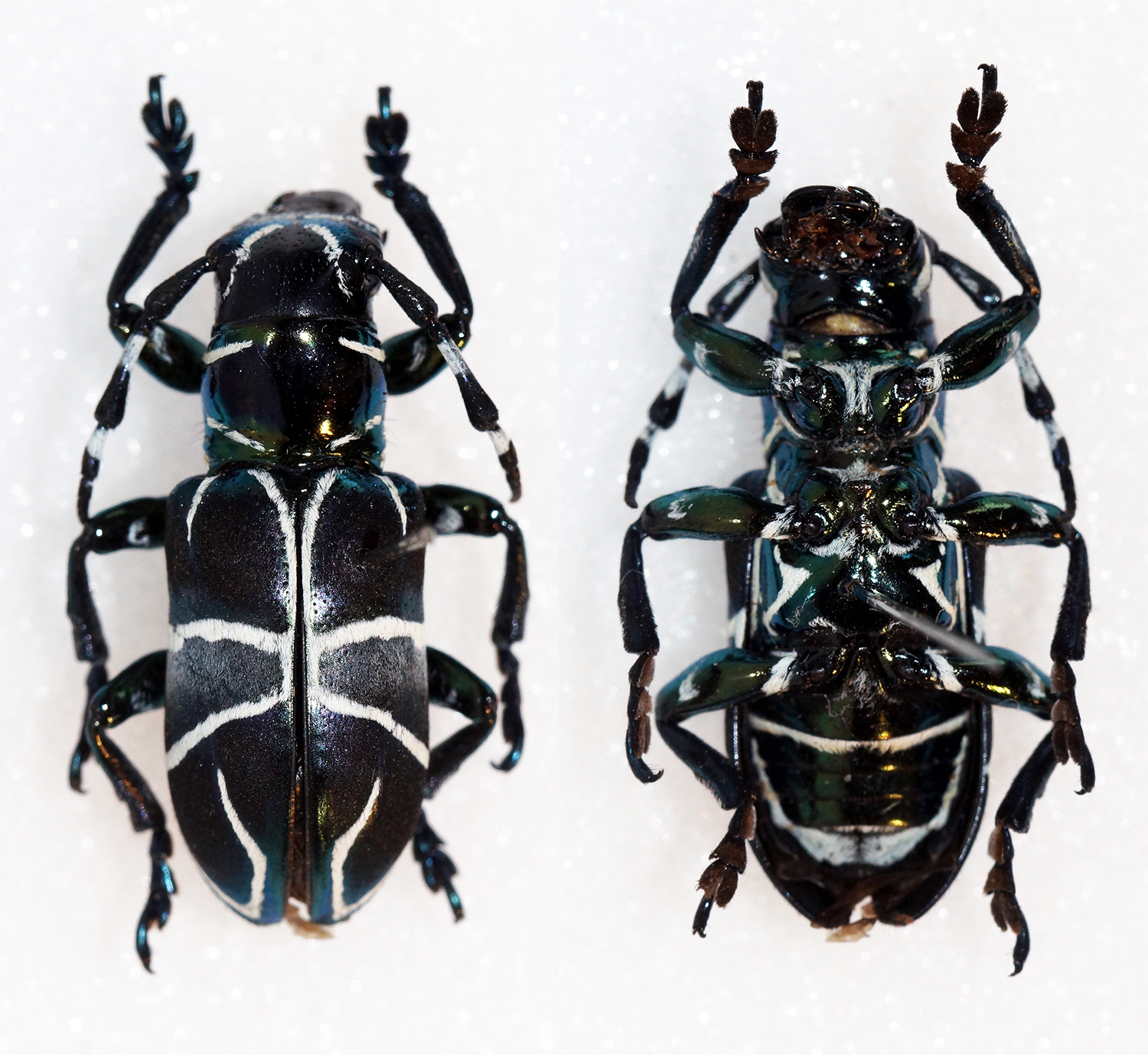

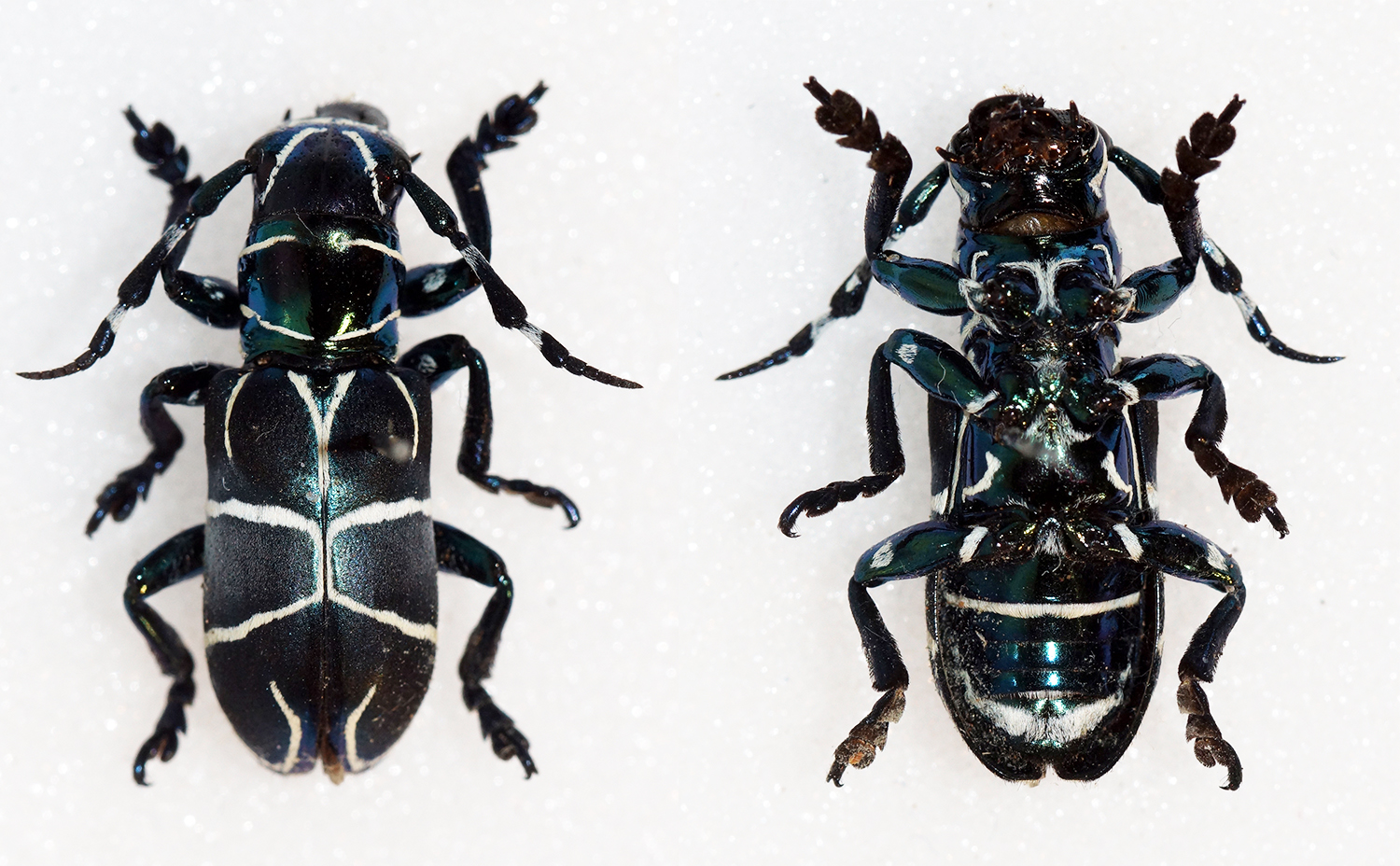

Scientific classification
- Kingdom: Animalia
- Phylum: Arthropoda
- Class: Insecta
- Order: Coleoptera
- Suborder: Polyphaga
- Infraorder: Cucujiformia
- Family: Cerambycidae
- Genus: Acronia
- Species: A. pretiosa

Binomial name
- Acronia pretiosa Schultze, 1917

= Acronia pretiosa =

Species of beetle

Acronia pretiosa is a species of beetle in the family Cerambycidae found in Asia. It is endemic to the Philippines.
