= Eupithecia specialis =

Scientific classification
- Domain: Eukaryota
- Kingdom: Animalia
- Phylum: Arthropoda
- Class: Insecta
- Order: Lepidoptera
- Family: Geometridae
- Genus: Eupithecia
- Species: E. specialis

Binomial name
- Eupithecia specialis (Schultze, 1920)

Synonyms
- Tephroclystia specialis Schultze, 1920

Species of moth

Eupithecia specialis is a moth in the family Geometridae.
