= Aslauga modesta =

Scientific classification
- Kingdom: Animalia
- Phylum: Arthropoda
- Class: Insecta
- Order: Lepidoptera
- Family: Lycaenidae
- Genus: Aslauga
- Species: A. modesta

Binomial name
- Aslauga modesta Schultze, 1923

Species of butterfly

Aslauga modesta is a butterfly in the family Lycaenidae. It is found in Cameroon.
