= Hypophytala obscura =

Scientific classification
- Domain: Eukaryota
- Kingdom: Animalia
- Phylum: Arthropoda
- Class: Insecta
- Order: Lepidoptera
- Family: Lycaenidae
- Genus: Hypophytala
- Species: H. obscura

Binomial name
- Hypophytala obscura (Schultze, 1916)

Synonyms
- Phytala obscura Schultze, 1916

Species of butterfly

Hypophytala obscura is a butterfly in the family Lycaenidae. It is found on Bioko off the west coast of Africa.
