= Aslauga kallimoides =

- Row "c", 1st and 2nd images

Scientific classification
- Kingdom: Animalia
- Phylum: Arthropoda
- Clade: Pancrustacea
- Class: Insecta
- Order: Lepidoptera
- Family: Lycaenidae
- Genus: Aslauga
- Species: A. kallimoides

Binomial name
- Aslauga kallimoides Schultze, 1912

Synonyms
- Paraslauga kallimoides; Aslauga cephren Druce, 1913

Species of butterfly

Aslauga kallimoides, the imitating aslauga, is a butterfly in the family Lycaenidae. It is found in southern Cameroon, the Republic of the Congo and the Democratic Republic of the Congo (Equateur).
