= Pseudabryna luzonica =

Scientific classification
- Domain: Eukaryota
- Kingdom: Animalia
- Phylum: Arthropoda
- Class: Insecta
- Order: Coleoptera
- Suborder: Polyphaga
- Infraorder: Cucujiformia
- Family: Cerambycidae
- Tribe: Pteropliini
- Genus: Pseudabryna
- Species: P. luzonica

Binomial name
- Pseudabryna luzonica Schultze, 1916

Species of beetle

Pseudabryna luzonica is a species of beetle in the family Cerambycidae. It was described by Arnold Schultze in 1916.
