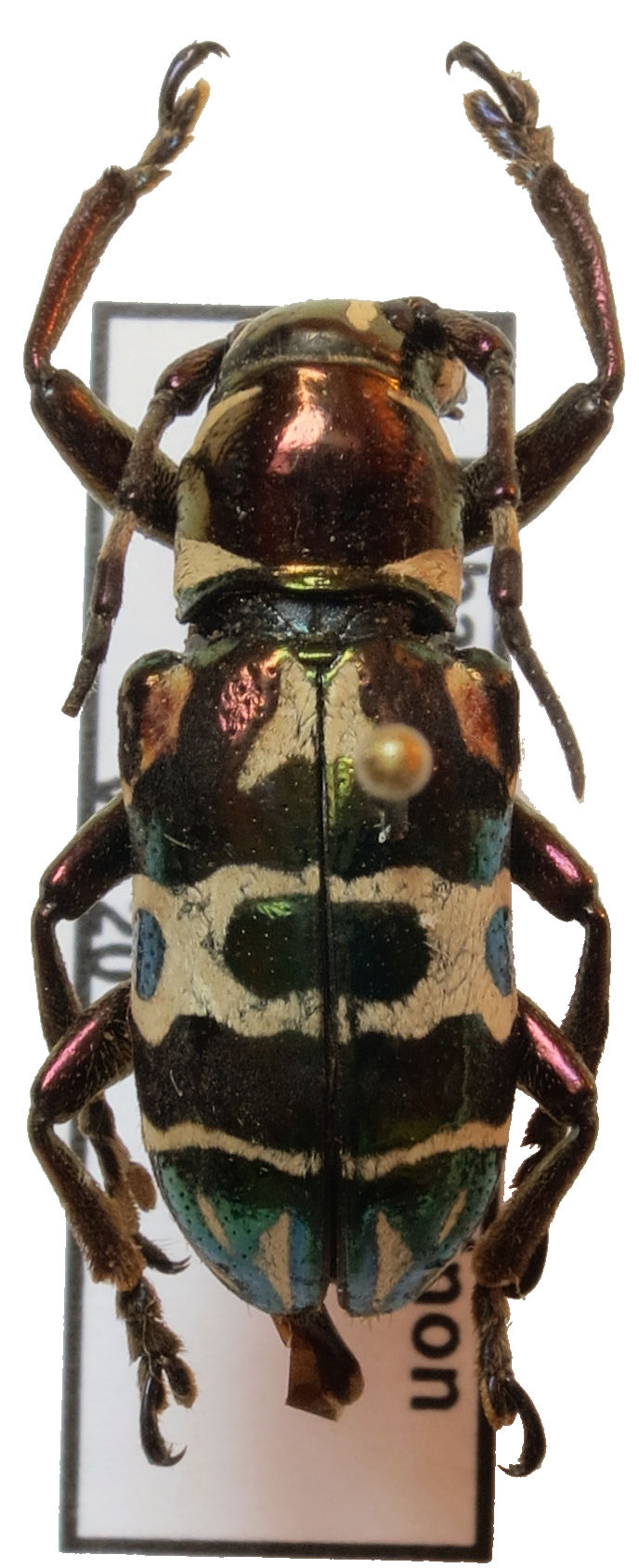
- Acronia gloriosa from Philippines

Scientific classification
- Kingdom: Animalia
- Phylum: Arthropoda
- Class: Insecta
- Order: Coleoptera
- Suborder: Polyphaga
- Infraorder: Cucujiformia
- Family: Cerambycidae
- Genus: Acronia
- Species: A. gloriosa

Binomial name
- Acronia gloriosa (Schultze, 1922)

Synonyms
- Acronia pretiosoides Breuning, 1980; Callimetopus gloriosus (Schultze, 1922); Euclea gloriosa Schultze, 1922; Euclea opulenta Heller, 1923

= Acronia gloriosa =

Species of beetle

Acronia gloriosa is a species of beetle in the family Cerambycidae. It was described by Arnold Schultze in 1922, originally under the genus Euclea. It is known from the Philippines.
