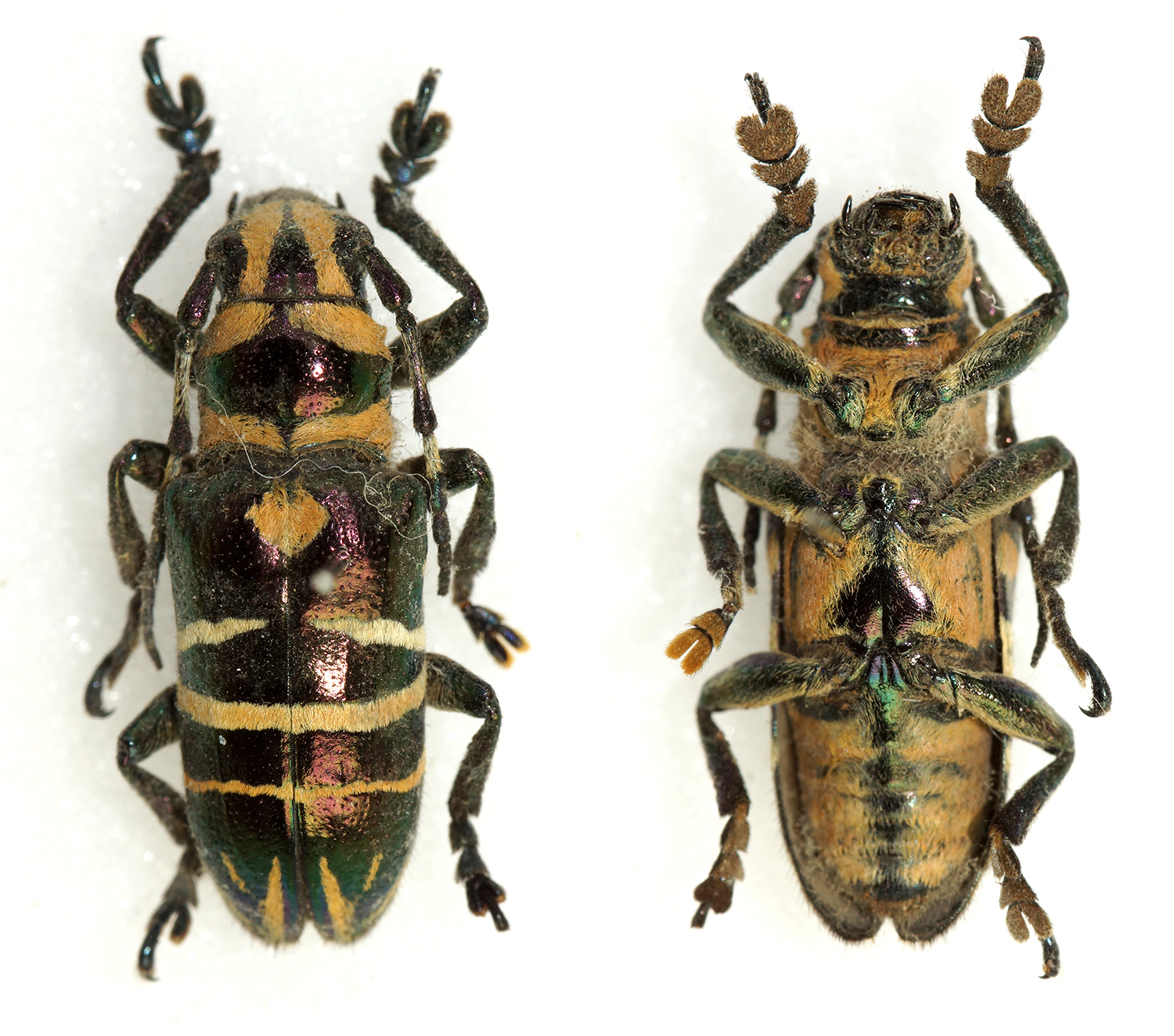

Scientific classification
- Kingdom: Animalia
- Phylum: Arthropoda
- Class: Insecta
- Order: Coleoptera
- Suborder: Polyphaga
- Infraorder: Cucujiformia
- Family: Cerambycidae
- Genus: Acronia
- Species: A. pulchella

Binomial name
- Acronia pulchella (Schultze, 1922)

Synonyms
- Callimetopus pulchellus (Schultze, 1922); Euclea pulchella Schultze, 1922

= Acronia pulchella =

Species of beetle

Acronia pulchella is a species of beetle in the family Cerambycidae. It was described by Arnold Schultze in 1922. It is known from the Philippines.
