= Aslauga aura =

Scientific classification
- Domain: Eukaryota
- Kingdom: Animalia
- Phylum: Arthropoda
- Class: Insecta
- Order: Lepidoptera
- Family: Lycaenidae
- Genus: Aslauga
- Species: A. aura

Binomial name
- Aslauga aura H. H. Druce, 1913

Species of butterfly

Aslauga aura is a butterfly in the family Lycaenidae first described by Hamilton Herbert Druce in 1913. It is found in Cameroon, Gabon and the Democratic Republic of the Congo (Equateur and Kivu).
