= Anauxesida longicornis =

Scientific classification
- Kingdom: Animalia
- Phylum: Arthropoda
- Class: Insecta
- Order: Coleoptera
- Suborder: Polyphaga
- Infraorder: Cucujiformia
- Family: Cerambycidae
- Genus: Anauxesida
- Species: A. longicornis

Binomial name
- Anauxesida longicornis (Fabricius, 1781)

Synonyms
- Saperda longicornis Fabricius, 1781; Cerambyx (Saperda) macroceras Gmelin, 1790; Cerambyx macroceras Gmelin, 1790

Species of beetle

Anauxesida longicornis is a species of beetle in the family Cerambycidae. It was described by Johan Christian Fabricius in 1781. It is known from Sub-Saharan Africa (Guinea, Sierra Leone, Chad, Ivory Coast, Gabon, Republic of the Congo, Democratic Republic of Congo, Angola).

Anauxesida longicornis measure 6.5–10 mm (0.26–0.39 in) in length.
