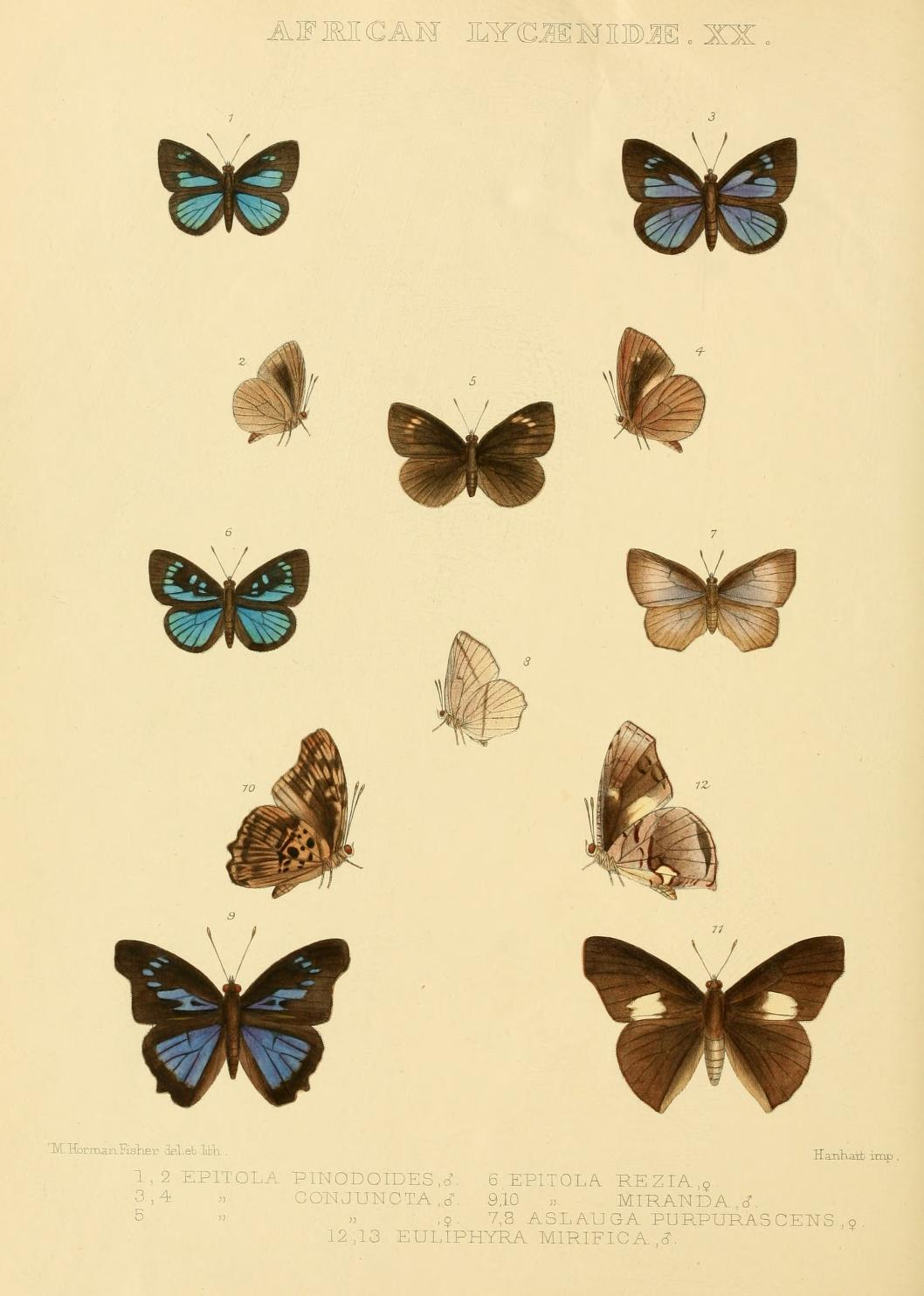
- Figures 7 and 8

Scientific classification
- Domain: Eukaryota
- Kingdom: Animalia
- Phylum: Arthropoda
- Class: Insecta
- Order: Lepidoptera
- Family: Lycaenidae
- Genus: Aslauga
- Species: A. purpurascens

Binomial name
- Aslauga purpurascens Holland, 1890

= Aslauga purpurascens =

Species of butterfly

Aslauga purpurascens is a butterfly in the family Lycaenidae. It is found in Cameroon, Gabon, the Republic of the Congo, the Central African Republic, the Democratic Republic of the Congo (Kinshasa, Ituri and North Kivu), Uganda, Rwanda, Burundi, Kenya, Tanzania and Zambia. The habitat consists of forests.

The larvae feed on Oxyrachis, Mesohomotoma and Stictococcus species.
