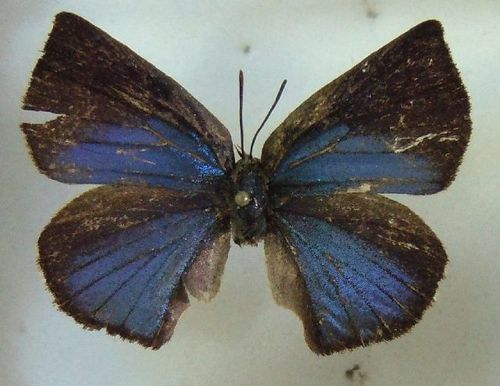

Scientific classification
- Kingdom: Animalia
- Phylum: Arthropoda
- Clade: Pancrustacea
- Class: Insecta
- Order: Lepidoptera
- Family: Lycaenidae
- Genus: Aslauga
- Species: A. confusa

Binomial name
- Aslauga confusa Libert, 1994

= Aslauga confusa =

Species of butterfly

Aslauga confusa is a butterfly in the family Lycaenidae. It is found in Cameroon, the Republic of the Congo and Gabon.
