= Aslauga australis =

Conservation status
- Endangered (IUCN 3.1)

Scientific classification
- Kingdom: Animalia
- Phylum: Arthropoda
- Class: Insecta
- Order: Lepidoptera
- Family: Lycaenidae
- Genus: Aslauga
- Species: A. australis

Binomial name
- Aslauga australis Cottrell, 1981

Species of butterfly

Aslauga australis, the southern purple, is a species of butterfly in the family Lycaenidae. It is endemic to South Africa, where it is known from only twenty locations consisting of savannah and coastal forest in the East Cape. It has also been recorded from Durban in KwaZulu-Natal.

The wingspan is 22–25 mm for males and 25–28 mm for females. Adults are on wing from spring to autumn.
