= Aprophata vigintiquatuormaculata =

Scientific classification
- Domain: Eukaryota
- Kingdom: Animalia
- Phylum: Arthropoda
- Class: Insecta
- Order: Coleoptera
- Suborder: Polyphaga
- Infraorder: Cucujiformia
- Family: Cerambycidae
- Tribe: Pteropliini
- Genus: Aprophata
- Species: A. vigintiquatuormaculata

Binomial name
- Aprophata vigintiquatuormaculata Schwarzer, 1931

Species of beetle

Aprophata vigintiquatuormaculata is a species of beetle in the family Cerambycidae. It was described by Bernhard Schwarzer in 1931. It is known from the Philippines.
