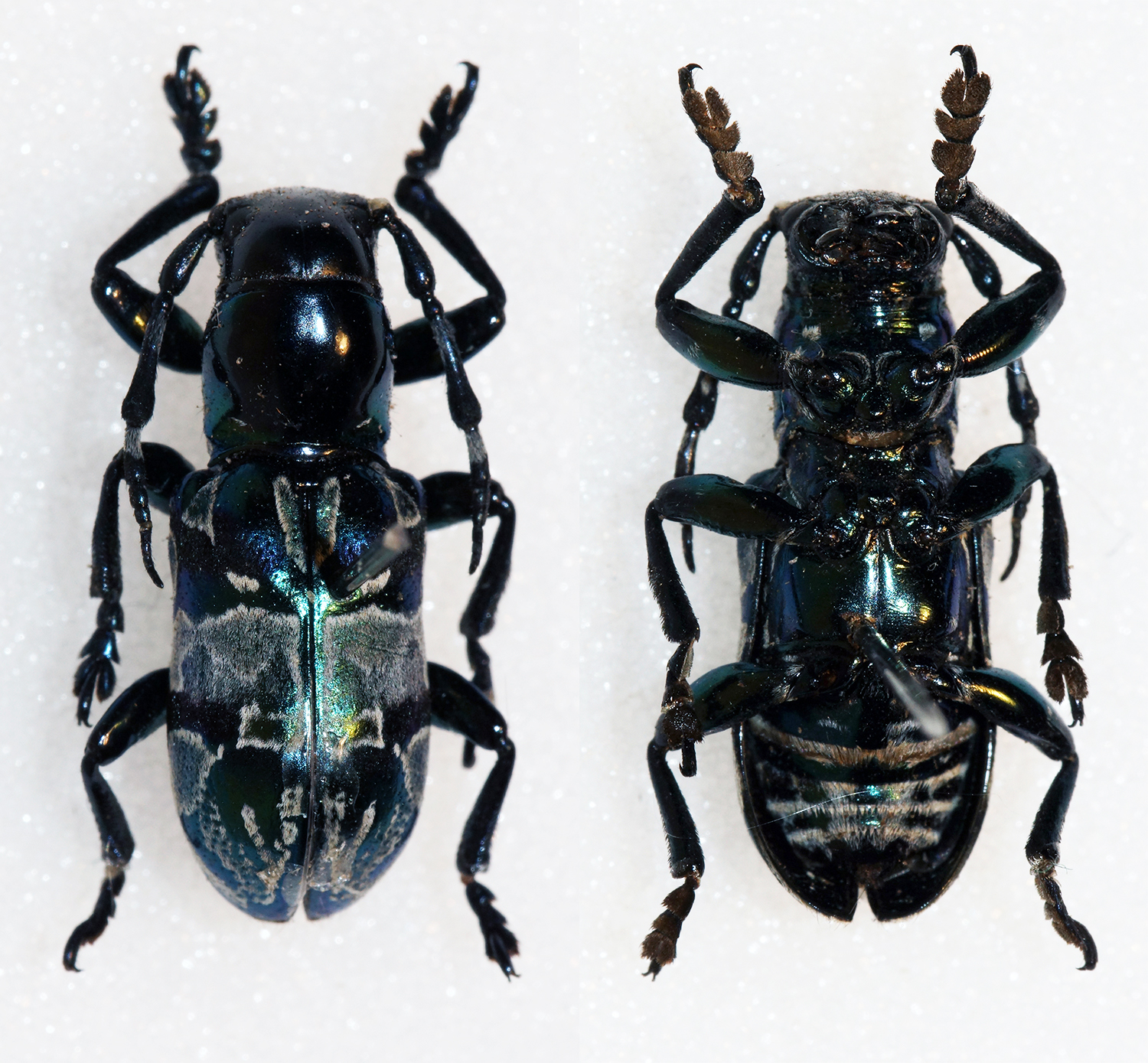
- Acronia vizcayana

Scientific classification
- Kingdom: Animalia
- Phylum: Arthropoda
- Class: Insecta
- Order: Coleoptera
- Suborder: Polyphaga
- Infraorder: Cucujiformia
- Family: Cerambycidae
- Tribe: Pteropliini
- Genus: Acronia; Westwood, 1864

= Acronia (beetle) =

Genus of beetles

Acronia is a genus of longhorn beetles of the subfamily Lamiinae.

== Species ==
Acronia containing the following species:

- Acronia gloriosa (Schultze, 1922)
- Acronia layronia Barševskis, 2017
- Acronia luzonica Schultze, 1934
- Acronia marifelipeae Barševskis, 2016
- Acronia nigra Breuning, 1947
- Acronia paulsi Barševskis, 2022
- Acronia perelegans Westwood, 1863
- Acronia pretiosa Schultze, 1917
- Acronia principalis (Heller, 1924)
- Acronia pulchella (Schultze, 1922)
- Acronia roseolata Breuning, 1947
- Acronia strasseni Schwarzer, 1931
- Acronia streicsi Barševskis, 2016
- Acronia superba (Breuning, 1947)
- Acronia teterevi Barševskis, 2016
- Acronia vizcayana Vives, 2009
- Acronia ysmaeli Hüdepohl, 1989
