= Hypophytala reducta =

Scientific classification
- Domain: Eukaryota
- Kingdom: Animalia
- Phylum: Arthropoda
- Class: Insecta
- Order: Lepidoptera
- Family: Lycaenidae
- Genus: Hypophytala
- Species: H. reducta

Binomial name
- Hypophytala reducta (Aurivillius, 1923)

Synonyms
- Phytala reducta Aurivillius, 1923

Species of butterfly

Hypophytala reducta is a butterfly in the family Lycaenidae. It is found in Cameroon, the Republic of the Congo and the Democratic Republic of the Congo.
