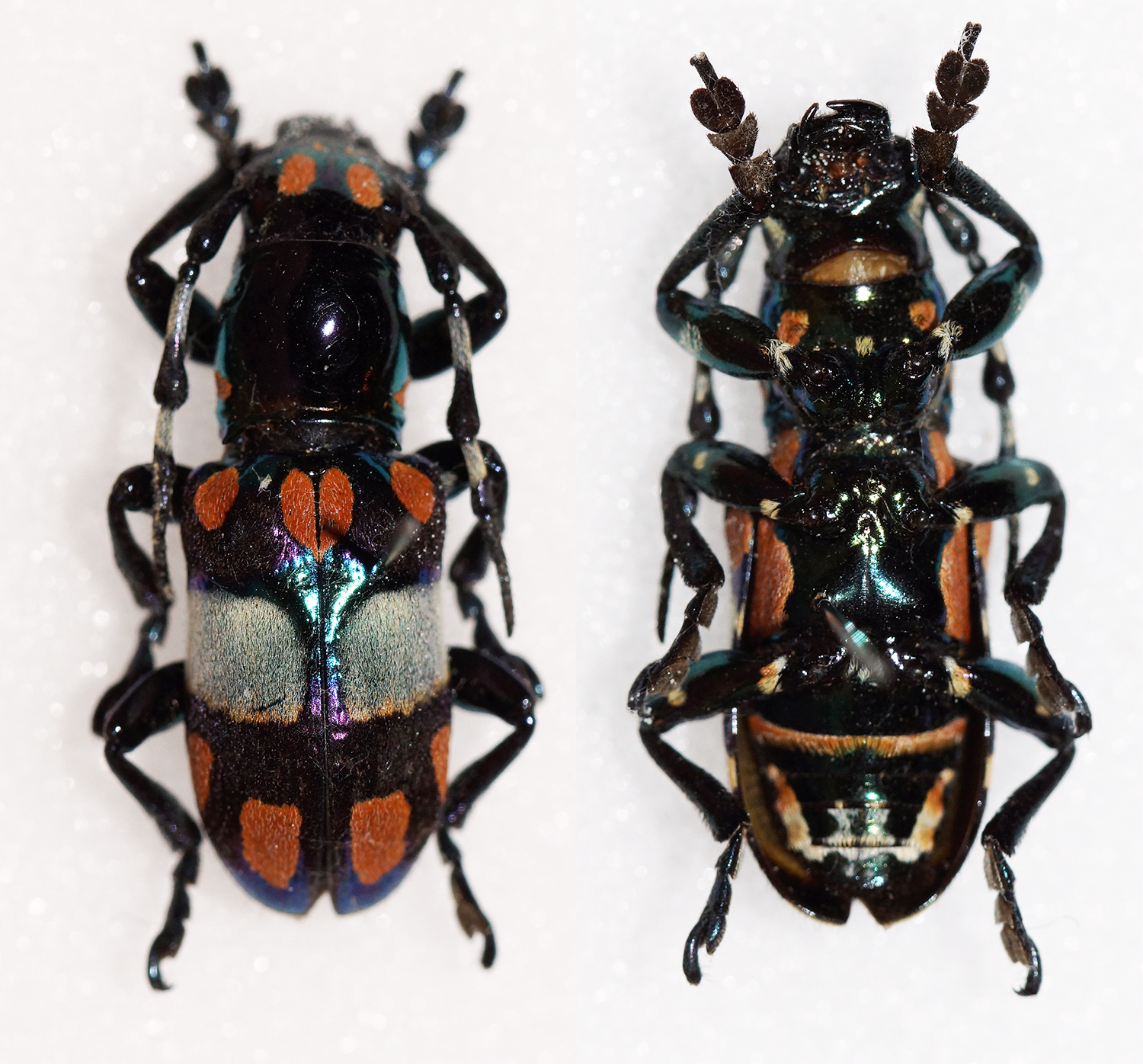

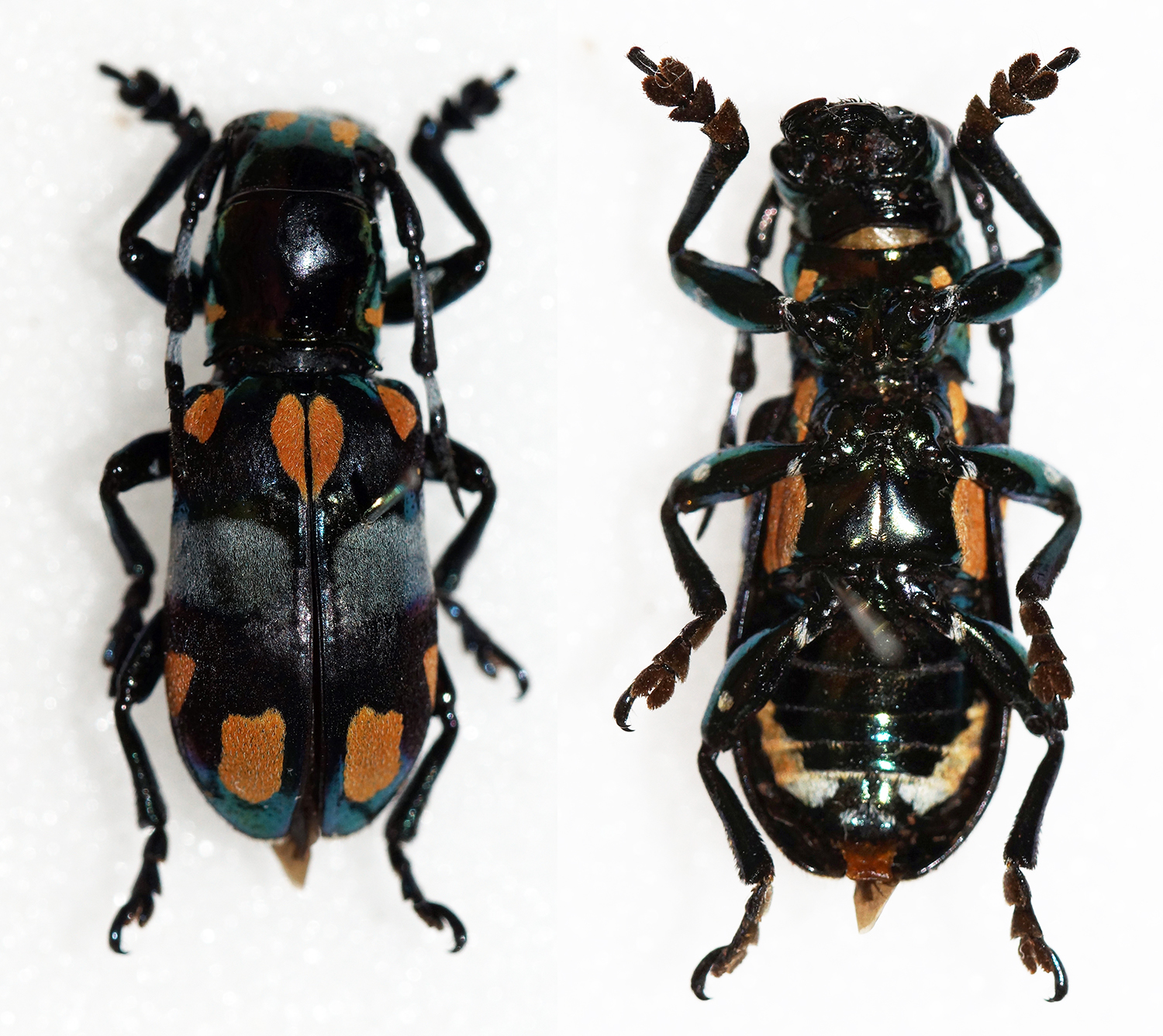

Scientific classification
- Kingdom: Animalia
- Phylum: Arthropoda
- Class: Insecta
- Order: Coleoptera
- Suborder: Polyphaga
- Infraorder: Cucujiformia
- Family: Cerambycidae
- Genus: Acronia
- Species: A. roseolata

Binomial name
- Acronia roseolata Breuning, 1947

Synonyms
- Acronia strasseni m. roseolata Breuning, 1947; Acronia marifelipeae Barševskis, 2016

= Acronia roseolata =

Species of beetle

Acronia roseolata is a species of beetle in the family Cerambycidae. It is endemic to Luzon, the Philippines.

Acronia roseolata measure 19–20 mm (0.75–0.79 in) in length.
