= Acronia perelegans =

Scientific classification
- Kingdom: Animalia
- Phylum: Arthropoda
- Class: Insecta
- Order: Coleoptera
- Suborder: Polyphaga
- Infraorder: Cucujiformia
- Family: Cerambycidae
- Genus: Acronia
- Species: A. perelegans

Binomial name
- Acronia perelegans Westwood, 1863

Species of beetle

Acronia perelegans is a species of beetle in the family Cerambycidae. It was described by John O. Westwood in 1863. It is known from the Philippines.
