= Aslauga atrophifurca =

Scientific classification
- Domain: Eukaryota
- Kingdom: Animalia
- Phylum: Arthropoda
- Class: Insecta
- Order: Lepidoptera
- Family: Lycaenidae
- Genus: Aslauga
- Species: A. atrophifurca

Binomial name
- Aslauga atrophifurca Cottrell, 1981

Species of butterfly

Aslauga atrophifurca, the Zimbabwe purple, is a butterfly in the family Lycaenidae. It is found in Zimbabwe. The habitat consists of savanna.

Adults are on wing from August to April.
