= Aslauga marginalis =

Scientific classification
- Kingdom: Animalia
- Phylum: Arthropoda
- Clade: Pancrustacea
- Class: Insecta
- Order: Lepidoptera
- Family: Lycaenidae
- Genus: Aslauga
- Species: A. marginalis

Binomial name
- Aslauga marginalis Kirby, 1890

Species of butterfly

Aslauga marginalis, the western aslauga, is a butterfly in the family Lycaenidae. It is found in Sierra Leone, Liberia, Ivory Coast, Ghana, Togo, southern Nigeria and possibly western Cameroon.The habitat consists of open spaces in forests and on forest edges.

Torben Larsen developed a species numbering system for his 2005 publication Butterflies of West Africa. The nominate subspecies is #118. The 'Larsen' numbers have since been used with permission in A Sharp Eye on Butterflies of Ghana.
