= Aslauga karamoja =

Scientific classification
- Kingdom: Animalia
- Phylum: Arthropoda
- Class: Insecta
- Order: Lepidoptera
- Family: Lycaenidae
- Genus: Aslauga
- Species: A. karamoja

Binomial name
- Aslauga karamoja (Libert, 1994)

Synonyms
- Egumbia karamoja Libert, 1994

Species of butterfly

Aslauga karamoja is a butterfly in the family Lycaenidae. It is found in Uganda.
