= Hypophytala nigrescens =

Scientific classification
- Kingdom: Animalia
- Phylum: Arthropoda
- Class: Insecta
- Order: Lepidoptera
- Family: Lycaenidae
- Genus: Hypophytala
- Species: H. nigrescens

Binomial name
- Hypophytala nigrescens (Jackson, 1964)

Synonyms
- Phytala nigrescens Jackson, 1964

Species of butterfly

Hypophytala nigrescens, the black flash, is a butterfly in the family Lycaenidae. It is found in Nigeria. The habitat consists of forests.
