= Anauxesida =

Scientific classification
- Domain: Eukaryota
- Kingdom: Animalia
- Phylum: Arthropoda
- Class: Insecta
- Order: Coleoptera
- Suborder: Polyphaga
- Infraorder: Cucujiformia
- Family: Cerambycidae
- Tribe: Agapanthiini
- Genus: Anauxesida

Genus of beetles

Anauxesida is a genus of beetles in the family Cerambycidae, containing the following species:

subgenus Anauxesida

- Anauxesida amaniensis Breuning, 1965
- Anauxesida cuneata Jordan, 1894
- Anauxesida fuscoantennalis Breuning, 1964
- Anauxesida haafi Breuning, 1961
- Anauxesida lineata Jordan, 1894
- Anauxesida longicornis (Fabricius, 1781)
- Anauxesida orientalis Breuning, 1948
- Anauxesida tanganjicae Breuning, 1958

subgenus Nimbanauxesida

- Anauxesida camerunica Breuning, 1978
- Anauxesida guineensis Breuning, 1966
- Anauxesida nimbae Lepesme & Breuning, 1952
