= Acronia strasseni =

Scientific classification
- Kingdom: Animalia
- Phylum: Arthropoda
- Class: Insecta
- Order: Coleoptera
- Suborder: Polyphaga
- Infraorder: Cucujiformia
- Family: Cerambycidae
- Genus: Acronia
- Species: A. strasseni

Binomial name
- Acronia strasseni Schwarzer, 1931

Species of beetle

Acronia strasseni is a species of beetle in the family Cerambycidae. It was described by Bernhard Schwarzer in 1931. It is known from the Philippines.
