= Aslauga tanga =

Scientific classification
- Kingdom: Animalia
- Phylum: Arthropoda
- Class: Insecta
- Order: Lepidoptera
- Family: Lycaenidae
- Genus: Aslauga
- Species: A. tanga

Binomial name
- Aslauga tanga Libert & Collins, 1997

Species of butterfly

Aslauga tanga is a butterfly in the family Lycaenidae. It is found in Tanzania (the Usambara and Nguru mountains).
