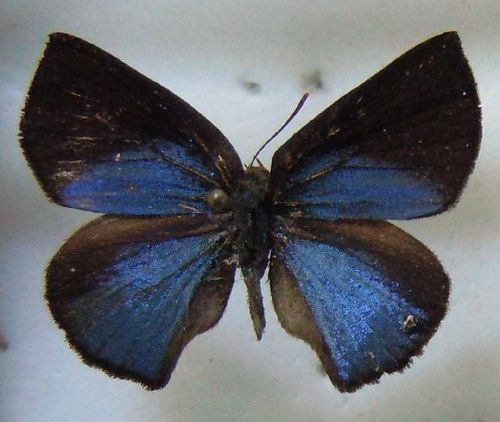

Conservation status
- Least Concern (IUCN 3.1)

Scientific classification
- Kingdom: Animalia
- Phylum: Arthropoda
- Class: Insecta
- Order: Lepidoptera
- Family: Lycaenidae
- Genus: Aslauga
- Species: A. prouvosti

Binomial name
- Aslauga prouvosti Libert & Bouyer, 1997

= Aslauga prouvosti =

Species of butterfly

Aslauga prouvosti, the Prouvost's aslauga, is a butterfly in the family Lycaenidae. It is found in Cameroon, the Democratic Republic of the Congo (Shaba) and western and north-western Tanzania.
