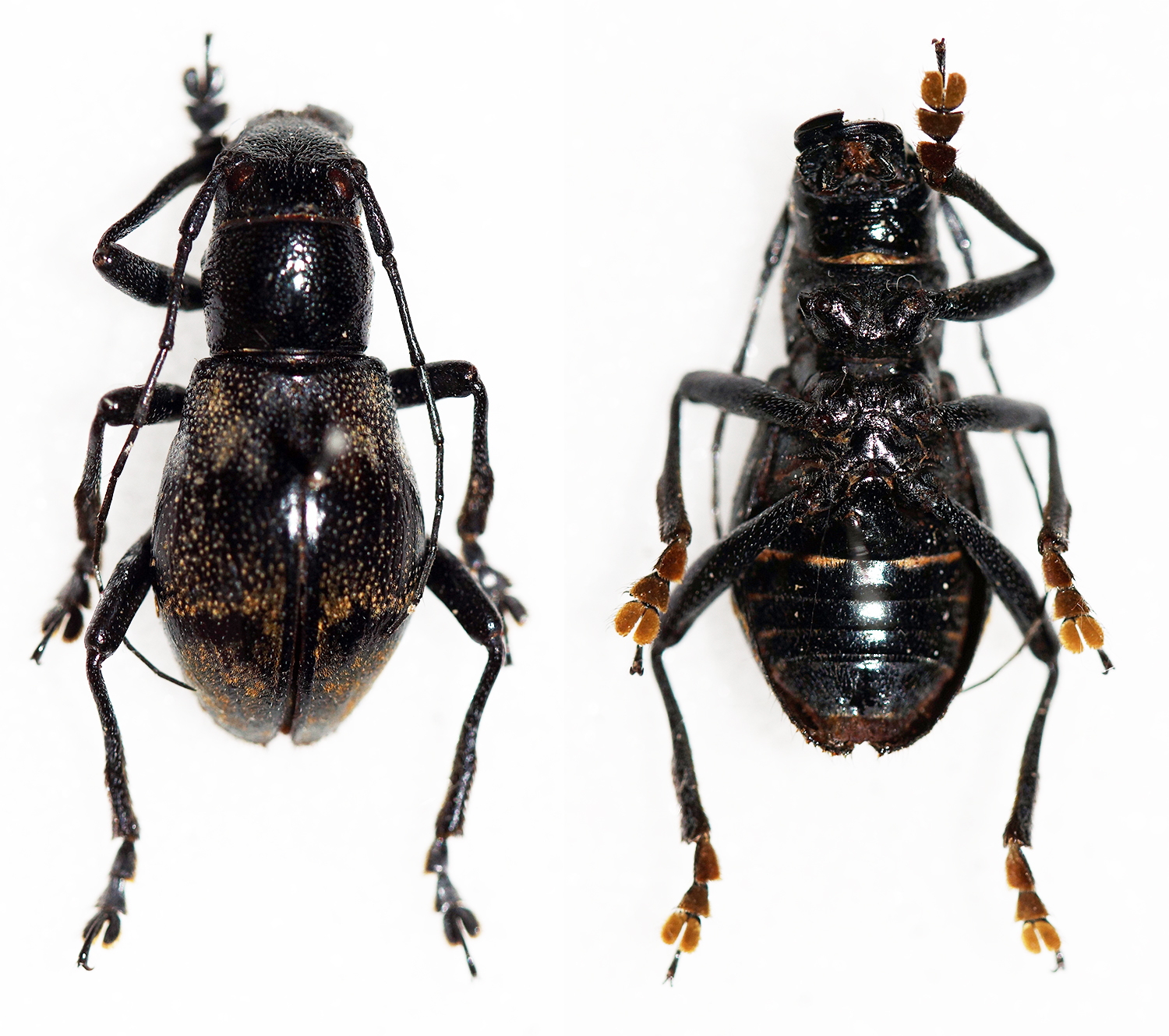

Scientific classification
- Domain: Eukaryota
- Kingdom: Animalia
- Phylum: Arthropoda
- Class: Insecta
- Order: Coleoptera
- Suborder: Polyphaga
- Infraorder: Cucujiformia
- Family: Cerambycidae
- Tribe: Pteropliini
- Genus: Aprophata
- Species: A. notha

Binomial name
- Aprophata notha (Newman, 1842)

Synonyms
- Abryna notha Newman, 1842

= Aprophata notha =

Species of beetle

Aprophata notha is a species of beetle in the family Cerambycidae. It was described by Newman in 1842, originally under the genus Abryna. It is known from the Philippines.
