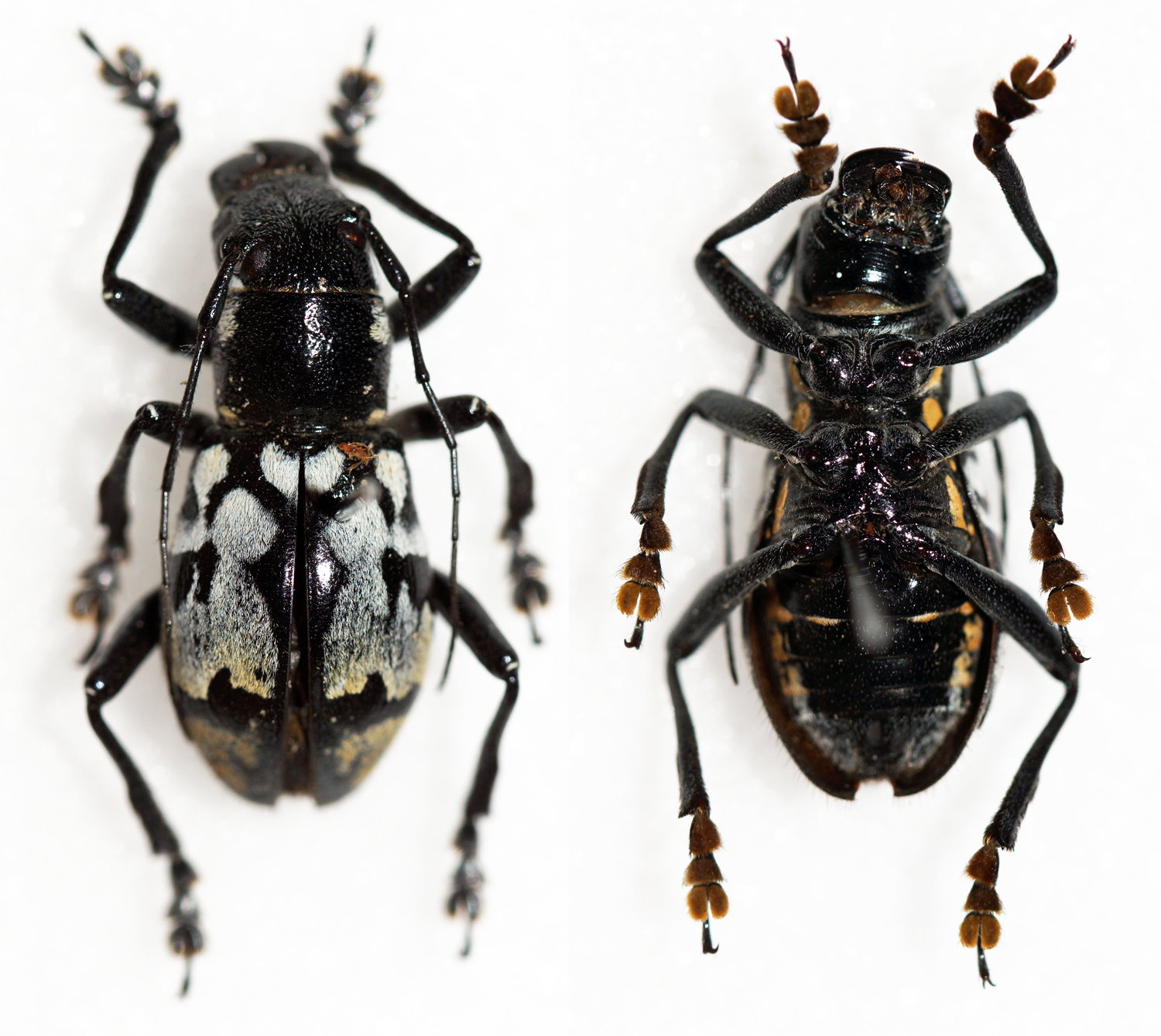

Scientific classification
- Kingdom: Animalia
- Phylum: Arthropoda
- Class: Insecta
- Order: Coleoptera
- Suborder: Polyphaga
- Infraorder: Cucujiformia
- Family: Cerambycidae
- Genus: Aprophata
- Species: A. eximioides

Binomial name
- Aprophata eximioides Breuning, 1961

= Aprophata eximioides =

Species of beetle

Aprophata eximioides is a species of beetle in the family Cerambycidae. It was described by Stephan von Breuning in 1961. It is known from the Philippines.
