= Aprophata aurorana =

Scientific classification
- Domain: Eukaryota
- Kingdom: Animalia
- Phylum: Arthropoda
- Class: Insecta
- Order: Coleoptera
- Suborder: Polyphaga
- Infraorder: Cucujiformia
- Family: Cerambycidae
- Tribe: Pteropliini
- Genus: Aprophata
- Species: A. aurorana

Binomial name
- Aprophata aurorana Vives, 2009

Synonyms
- Aprophata aurorana Vives, 2009

Species of beetle

Aprophata aurorana is a species of beetle in the family Cerambycidae. It was described by Vives in 2009. It is known from the Philippines.
