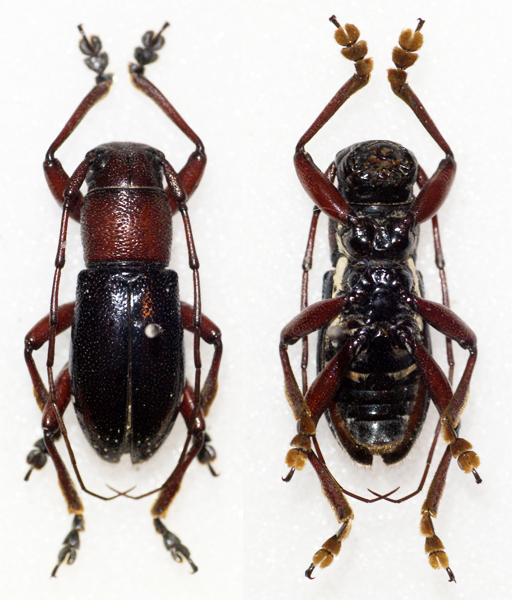

Scientific classification
- Domain: Eukaryota
- Kingdom: Animalia
- Phylum: Arthropoda
- Class: Insecta
- Order: Coleoptera
- Suborder: Polyphaga
- Infraorder: Cucujiformia
- Family: Cerambycidae
- Tribe: Pteropliini
- Genus: Aprophata
- Species: A. ruficollis

Binomial name
- Aprophata ruficollis Heller, 1916

Synonyms
- Abryna hoffmeisteri Schultze, 1916

= Aprophata ruficollis =

Species of beetle

Aprophata ruficollis is a species of beetle in the family Cerambycidae. It was described by Heller in 1916. It is known from the Philippines.
