= Aslauga febe =

Scientific classification
- Kingdom: Animalia
- Phylum: Arthropoda
- Clade: Pancrustacea
- Class: Insecta
- Order: Lepidoptera
- Family: Lycaenidae
- Genus: Aslauga
- Species: A. febe

Binomial name
- Aslauga febe (Libert, 1994)

Synonyms
- Egumbia febe Libert, 1994

Species of butterfly

Aslauga febe is a butterfly in the family Lycaenidae. It is found in Cameroon.
