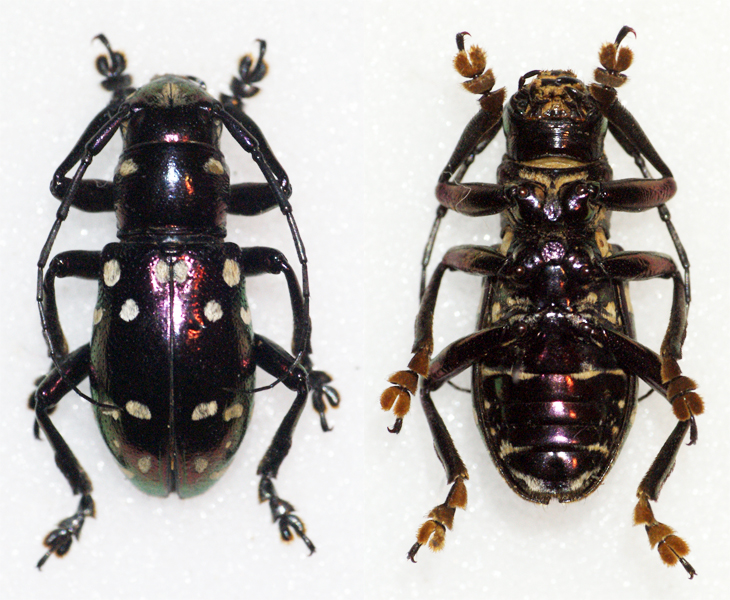

Scientific classification
- Kingdom: Animalia
- Phylum: Arthropoda
- Clade: Pancrustacea
- Class: Insecta
- Order: Coleoptera
- Suborder: Polyphaga
- Infraorder: Cucujiformia
- Family: Cerambycidae
- Genus: Aprophata
- Species: A. semperi

Binomial name
- Aprophata semperi (Westwood, 1863)

Synonyms
- Abryna semperi Westwood, 1863

= Aprophata semperi =

Species of beetle

Aprophata semperi is a species of beetle in the family Cerambycidae. They are part of a subfamily Lamiinae, known as "flat-faced longhorn beetles."

This species was first described by John O. Westwood in 1863, and was found on the island of Luzon, in the Philippines.
