= Hypophytala ultramarina =

Scientific classification
- Domain: Eukaryota
- Kingdom: Animalia
- Phylum: Arthropoda
- Class: Insecta
- Order: Lepidoptera
- Family: Lycaenidae
- Genus: Hypophytala
- Species: H. ultramarina

Binomial name
- Hypophytala ultramarina Libert & Collins, 1999

Species of butterfly

Hypophytala ultramarina, the ultramarine flash, is a butterfly in the family Lycaenidae. It is found in Togo, Nigeria (south and the Cross River loop), Cameroon and the western part of the Republic of the Congo. The habitat consists of forests.
