= Acronia principalis =

Scientific classification
- Kingdom: Animalia
- Phylum: Arthropoda
- Class: Insecta
- Order: Coleoptera
- Suborder: Polyphaga
- Infraorder: Cucujiformia
- Family: Cerambycidae
- Genus: Acronia
- Species: A. principalis

Binomial name
- Acronia principalis (Heller, 1924)

Synonyms
- Callimetopus principalis (Heller, 1924); Niphonoclea principalis Heller, 1924

Species of beetle

Acronia principalis is a species of beetle in the family Cerambycidae. It was described by Heller in 1924. It is known from the Philippines.
