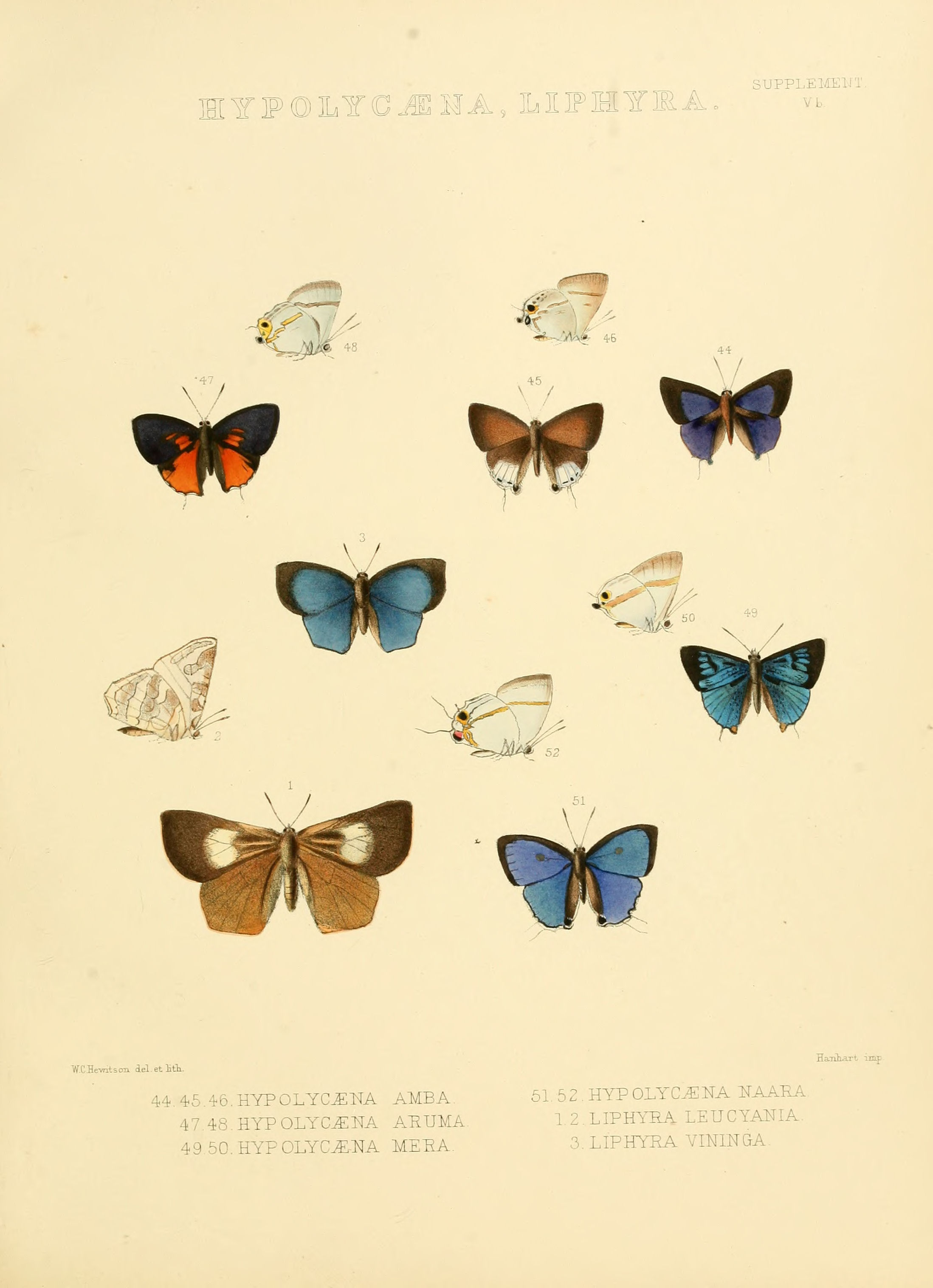
- Figure 3

Scientific classification
- Kingdom: Animalia
- Phylum: Arthropoda
- Clade: Pancrustacea
- Class: Insecta
- Order: Lepidoptera
- Family: Lycaenidae
- Subfamily: Miletinae
- Tribe: Liphyrini
- Genus: Aslauga; Kirby, 1890

Synonyms
- Egumbia Bethune-Baker, 1924; Paraslauga Bethune-Baker, 1925; Euliphyrodes Romieux, 1937

= Aslauga =

Butterfly genus in family Lycaenidae

Aslauga is a genus of butterflies in the family Lycaenidae. They are associated with other insects and found only in the Afrotropical realm. They are small usually grey-blue or grey-purple butterflies with a distinctive, but widely varied wing shape, especially pronounced in A. pandora. They are forest butterflies of the Congolian forests and Lower Guinean forests.

Original description by William Forsell Kirby:

"Wings short and broad, very densely scaled; anterior wings strongly curved outwards in the middle of the hind margin; posterior wings with a concavity on the inner margin at the anal angle. Anterior wings with the subcostal nervure five-branched, the first two branches emitted near together before the end of the cell and parallel, the other three short and emitted near the apex of the wing; the third and fourth parallel, running into the costa before the apex, the fifth running to the hind margin just below the apex".

== Species ==
- Aslauga abri Collins & Libert, 1997
- Aslauga atrophifurca Cottrell, 1981
- Aslauga aura Druce, 1913
- Aslauga australis Cottrell, 1981
- Aslauga bella Bethune-Baker, 1913
- Aslauga bitjensis Bethune-Baker, 1925
- Aslauga bouyeri Libert, 1994
- Aslauga camerunica Stempffer, 1969
- Aslauga confusa Libert, 1994
- Aslauga ernesti (Karsch, 1895)
- Aslauga febe (Libert, 1994)
- Aslauga guineensis Collins & Libert, 1997
- Aslauga imitans Libert, 1994
- Aslauga kallimoides Schultze, 1912
- Aslauga karamoja (Libert, 1994)
- Aslauga katangana (Romieux, 1937)
- Aslauga lamborni Bethune-Baker, 1914
- Aslauga latifurca Cottrell, 1981
- Aslauga marginalis Kirby, 1890
- Aslauga marshalli Butler, 1898
- Aslauga modesta Schultze, 1923
- Aslauga orientalis Cottrell, 1981
- Aslauga pandora Druce, 1913
- Aslauga prouvosti Libert & Bouyer, 1997
- Aslauga purpurascens Holland, 1890
- Aslauga satyroides Libert, 1994
- Aslauga tanga Libert & Collins, 1997
- Aslauga vininga (Hewitson, 1875)
