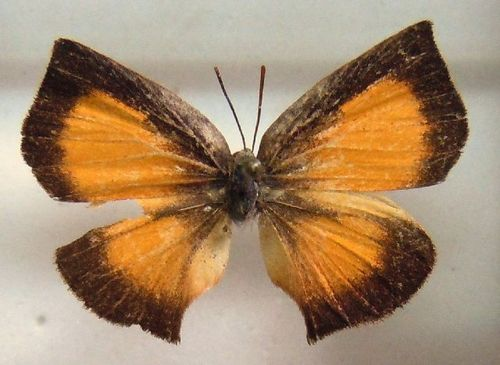

Scientific classification
- Kingdom: Animalia
- Phylum: Arthropoda
- Class: Insecta
- Order: Lepidoptera
- Family: Lycaenidae
- Genus: Aslauga
- Species: A. bouyeri

Binomial name
- Aslauga bouyeri Libert, 1994

= Aslauga bouyeri =

Species of butterfly

Aslauga bouyeri is a butterfly in the family Lycaenidae. It is found in Cameroon and Tanzania.

== Subspecies ==
- Aslauga bouyeri bouyeri (central Cameroon)
- Aslauga bouyeri congdoni Libert & Collins, 1997 (Tanzania)
