= Acronia teterevi =

Scientific classification
- Kingdom: Animalia
- Phylum: Arthropoda
- Class: Insecta
- Order: Coleoptera
- Suborder: Polyphaga
- Infraorder: Cucujiformia
- Family: Cerambycidae
- Genus: Acronia
- Species: A. teterevi

Binomial name
- Acronia teterevi Barševskis, 2016

Species of beetle

Acronia teterevi is a species of beetle in the family Cerambycidae. It was described by Barševskis in 2016.
