= Aslauga bitjensis =

Scientific classification
- Kingdom: Animalia
- Phylum: Arthropoda
- Class: Insecta
- Order: Lepidoptera
- Family: Lycaenidae
- Genus: Aslauga
- Species: A. bitjensis

Binomial name
- Aslauga bitjensis Bethune-Baker, 1925

Species of butterfly

Aslauga bitjensis is a butterfly in the family Lycaenidae. It is found in Cameroon.
