= Aslauga katangana =

Scientific classification
- Kingdom: Animalia
- Phylum: Arthropoda
- Class: Insecta
- Order: Lepidoptera
- Family: Lycaenidae
- Genus: Aslauga
- Species: A. katangana

Binomial name
- Aslauga katangana (Romieux, 1937)

Synonyms
- Euliphyrodes katangana Romieux, 1937

Species of butterfly

Aslauga katangana is a butterfly in the family Lycaenidae. It is found in the eastern part of the Democratic Republic of the Congo.
