= Aslauga abri =

Scientific classification
- Kingdom: Animalia
- Phylum: Arthropoda
- Class: Insecta
- Order: Lepidoptera
- Family: Lycaenidae
- Genus: Aslauga
- Species: A. abri

Binomial name
- Aslauga abri Collins & Libert, 1997

Species of butterfly

Aslauga abri is a butterfly in the family Lycaenidae. It is found in north-western Tanzania. The habitat consists of forests.
