= Aslauga orientalis =

Scientific classification
- Domain: Eukaryota
- Kingdom: Animalia
- Phylum: Arthropoda
- Class: Insecta
- Order: Lepidoptera
- Family: Lycaenidae
- Genus: Aslauga
- Species: A. orientalis

Binomial name
- Aslauga orientalis Cottrell, 1981

Species of butterfly

Aslauga orientalis is a butterfly in the family Lycaenidae. It is found along the coasts of Kenya and Tanzania and in Zambia.

The larvae feed on Coccidae species.
