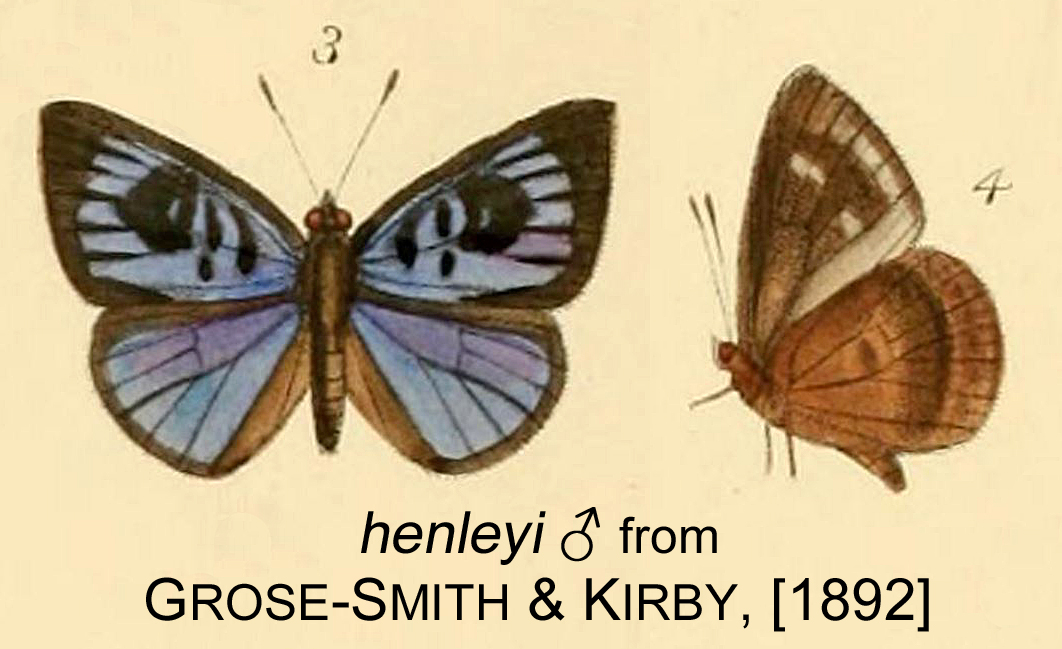

Scientific classification
- Domain: Eukaryota
- Kingdom: Animalia
- Phylum: Arthropoda
- Class: Insecta
- Order: Lepidoptera
- Family: Lycaenidae
- Genus: Hypophytala
- Species: H. henleyi

Binomial name
- Hypophytala henleyi (Kirby, 1890)

Synonyms
- Epitola henleyi Kirby, 1890; Phytala henleyi

= Hypophytala henleyi =

Species of butterfly

Hypophytala henleyi, the Grose-Smith's flash, is a butterfly in the family Lycaenidae. It is found in Liberia, Ivory Coast, Ghana, Nigeria (south and the Cross River loop), Cameroon, the Republic of the Congo, the Central African Republic and the western part of the Democratic Republic of the Congo. The habitat consists of forests.
