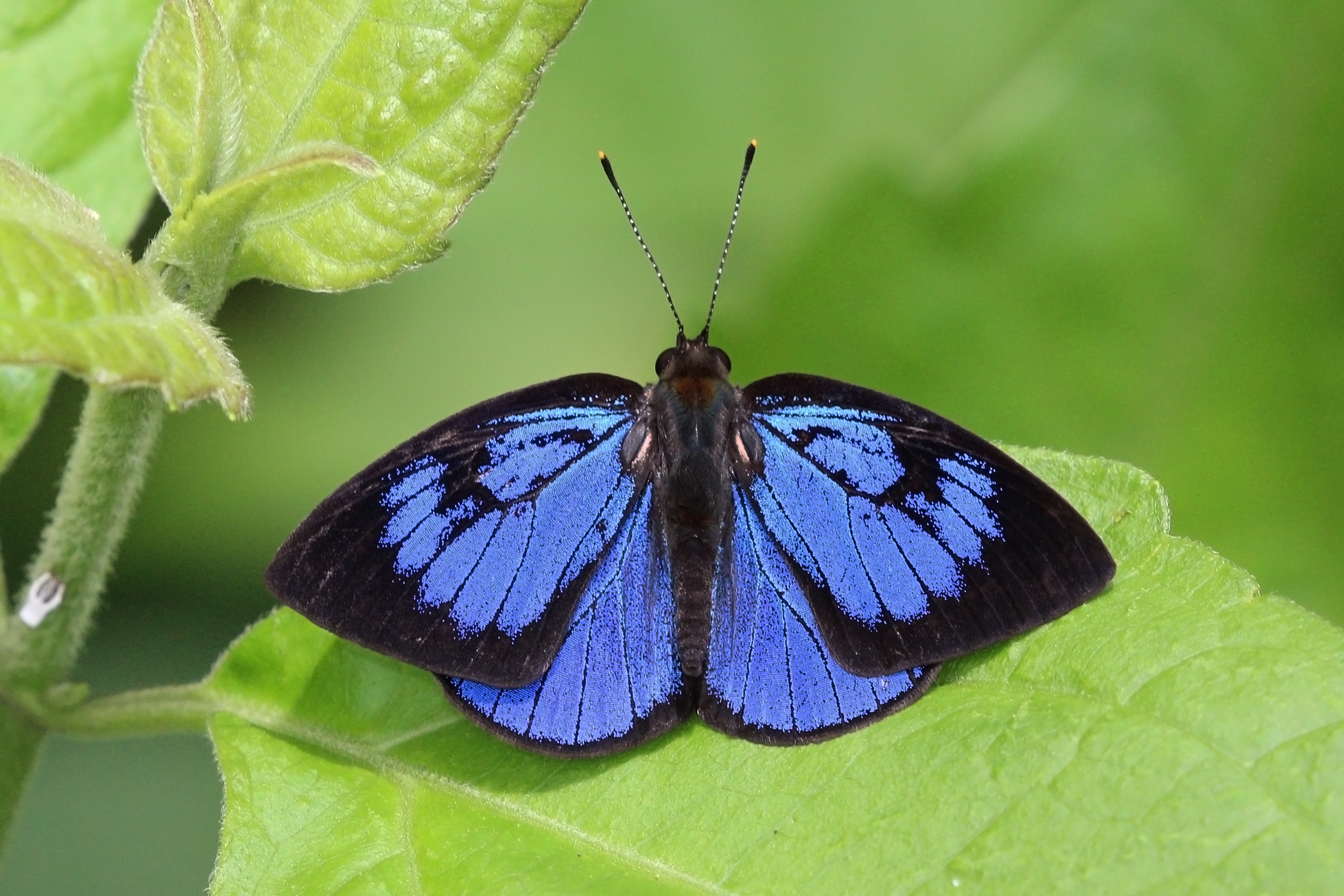

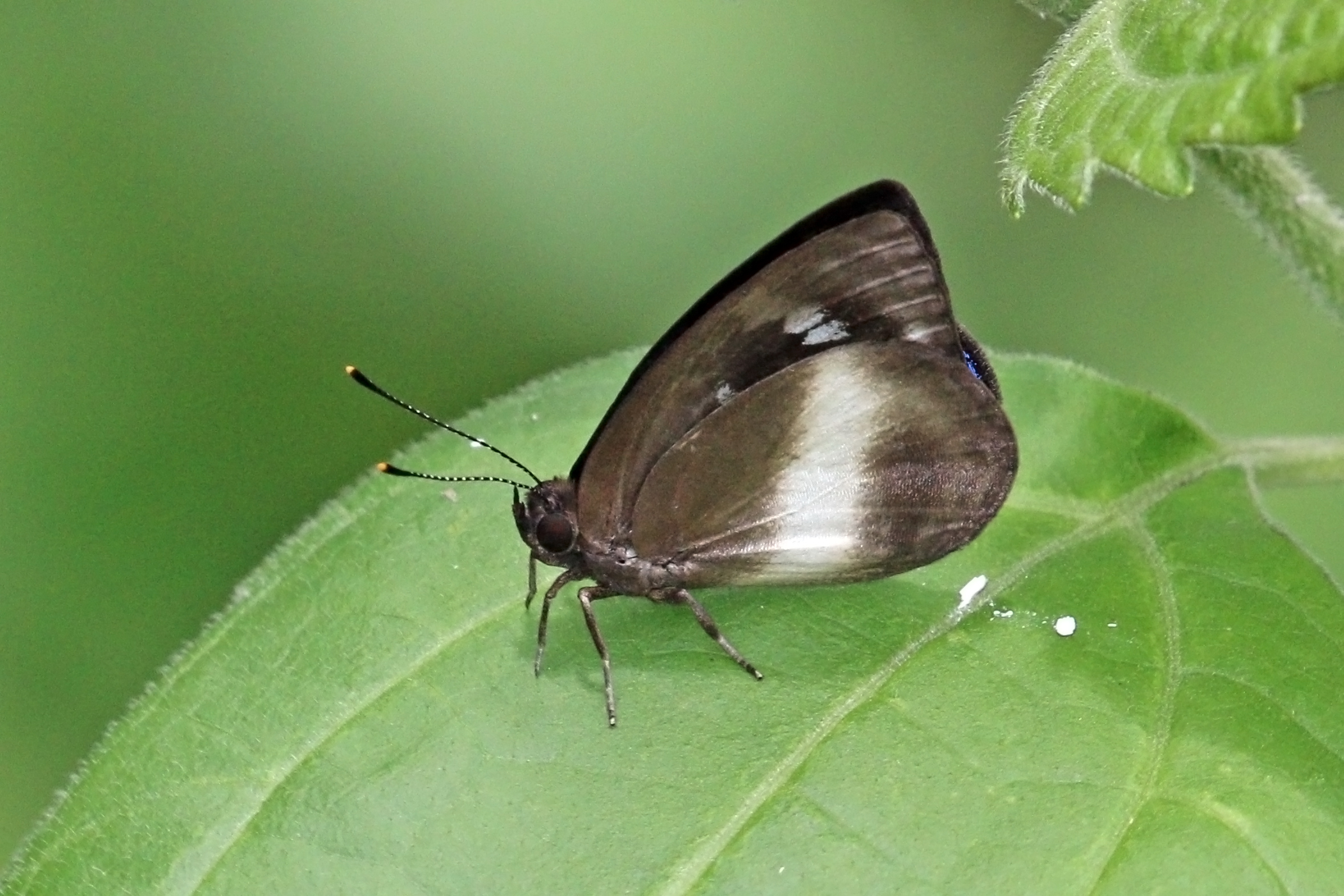
- the same male at Aburi Botanical Gardens, Ghana

Scientific classification
- Kingdom: Animalia
- Phylum: Arthropoda
- Clade: Pancrustacea
- Class: Insecta
- Order: Lepidoptera
- Family: Lycaenidae
- Genus: Hypophytala
- Species: H. hyettoides

Binomial name
- Hypophytala hyettoides (Aurivillius, 1895)

Synonyms
- Epitola hyettoides Aurivillius, 1895; Phytala hyettoides; Phytala aequatorialis Jackson, 1964; Hypophytala aequatorialis

= Hypophytala hyettoides =

Species of butterfly

Hypophytala hyettoides, the common flash, is a butterfly in the family Lycaenidae. It is found in Sierra Leone, Ivory Coast, Ghana, Togo, Nigeria (south and the Cross River loop), Cameroon and Equatorial Guinea (Bioko). The habitat consists of forests.

Torben Larsen developed a species numbering system for his 2005 publication Butterflies of West Africa. This species is #308. The 'Larsen' numbers have since been used with permission in A Sharp Eye on Butterflies of Ghana.
