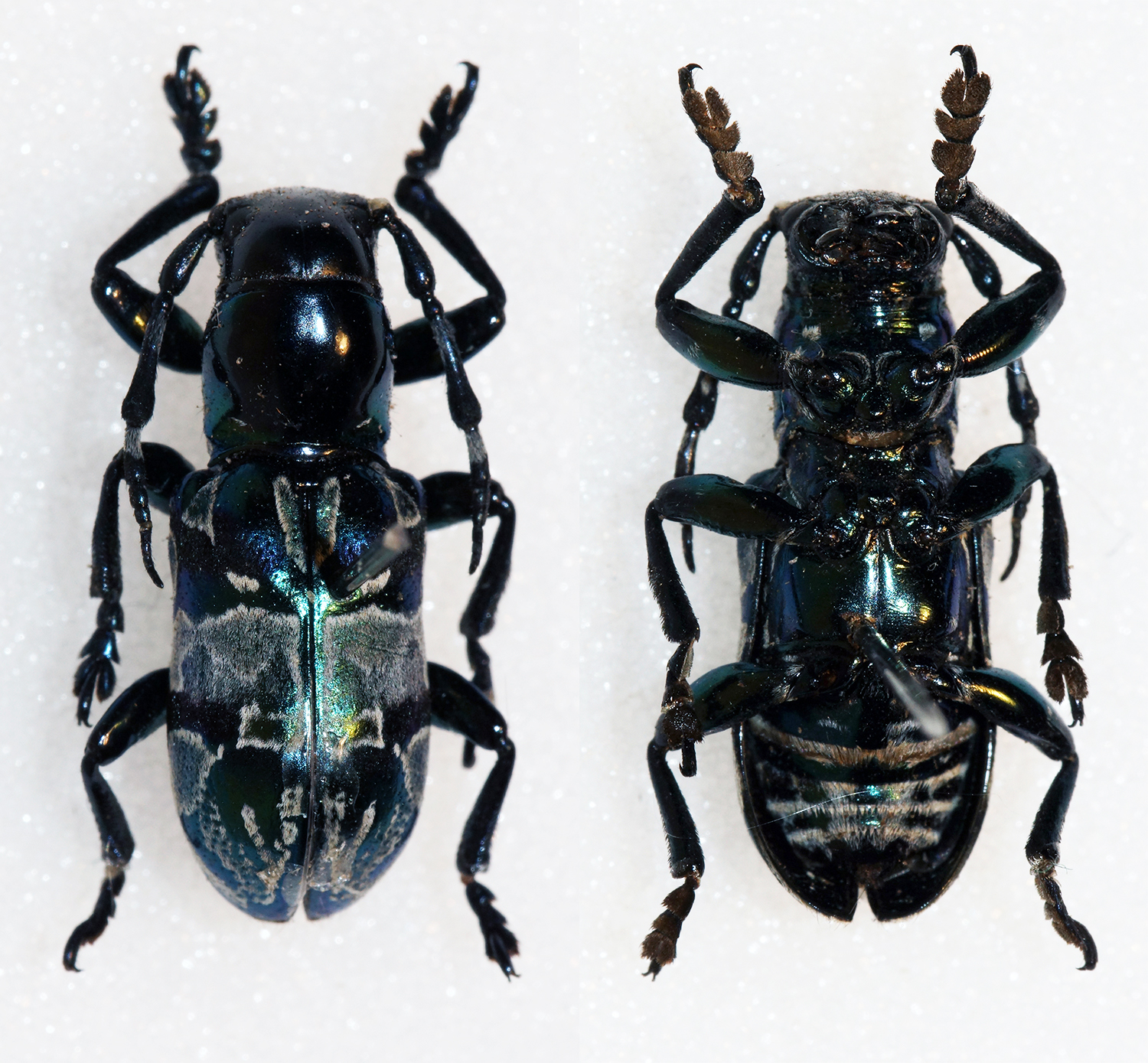

Scientific classification
- Kingdom: Animalia
- Phylum: Arthropoda
- Class: Insecta
- Order: Coleoptera
- Suborder: Polyphaga
- Infraorder: Cucujiformia
- Family: Cerambycidae
- Genus: Acronia
- Species: A. vizcayana

Binomial name
- Acronia vizcayana Vives, 2009

= Acronia vizcayana =

Species of beetle

Acronia vizcayana is an Asian species of beetle in the family Cerambycidae. It is endemic to the Philippines.
