= Anauxesida haafi =

Scientific classification
- Kingdom: Animalia
- Phylum: Arthropoda
- Class: Insecta
- Order: Coleoptera
- Suborder: Polyphaga
- Infraorder: Cucujiformia
- Family: Cerambycidae
- Genus: Anauxesida
- Species: A. haafi

Binomial name
- Anauxesida haafi Breuning, 1961

Species of beetle

Anauxesida haafi is a species of beetle in the family Cerambycidae. It was described by Stephan von Breuning in 1961.
