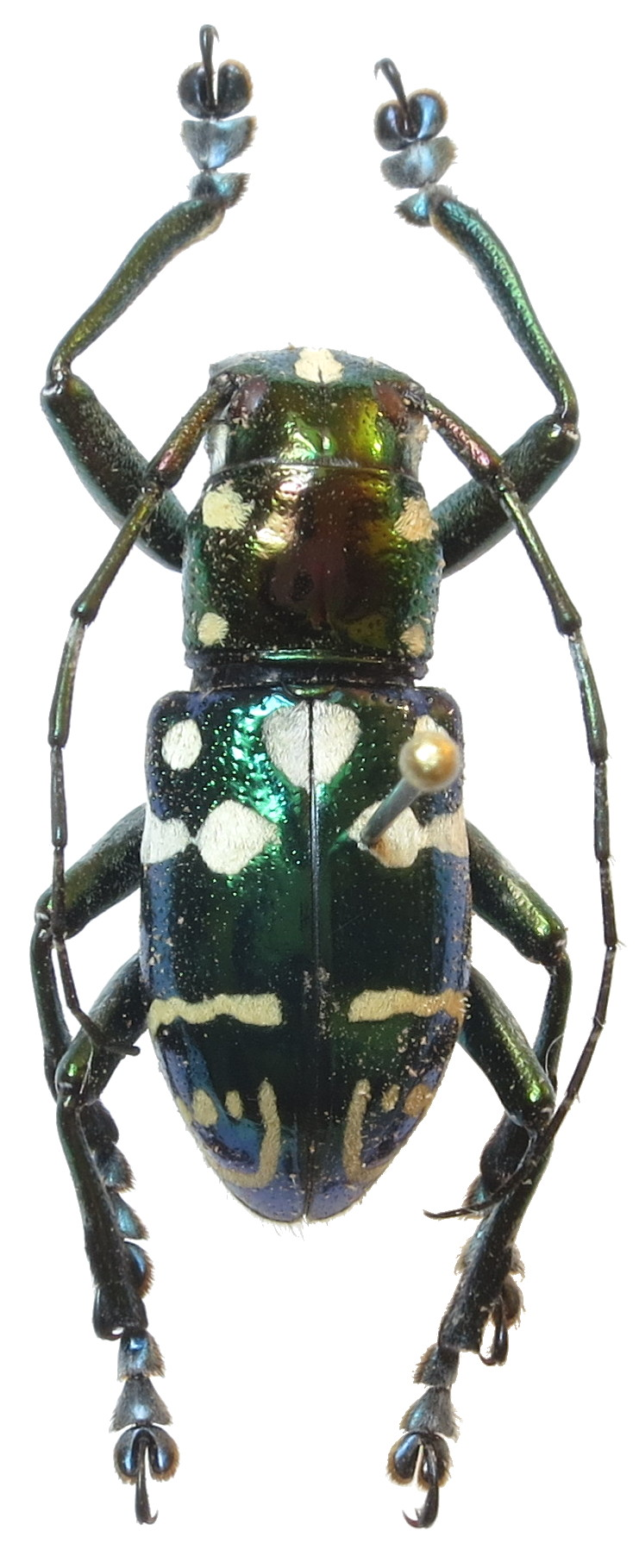
- A. eximia male from Philippines

Scientific classification
- Domain: Eukaryota
- Kingdom: Animalia
- Phylum: Arthropoda
- Class: Insecta
- Order: Coleoptera
- Suborder: Polyphaga
- Infraorder: Cucujiformia
- Family: Cerambycidae
- Tribe: Pteropliini
- Genus: Aprophata
- Species: A. eximia

Binomial name
- Aprophata eximia (Newman, 1842)

Synonyms
- Abryna eximia Newman, 1842

= Aprophata eximia =

Species of beetle

Aprophata eximia is a species of beetle in the family Cerambycidae. It was described by Newman in 1842, originally under the genus Abryna. It is known from the Philippines.

== Varietas ==
- Aprophata eximia var. cuprea (Westwood, 1863)
- Aprophata eximia var. purpureonigricans (Westwood, 1863)
- Aprophata eximia var. viridis (Westwood, 1863)
