= Aslauga latifurca =

Conservation status
- Least Concern (IUCN 3.1)

Scientific classification
- Kingdom: Animalia
- Phylum: Arthropoda
- Class: Insecta
- Order: Lepidoptera
- Family: Lycaenidae
- Genus: Aslauga
- Species: A. latifurca

Binomial name
- Aslauga latifurca Cottrell, 1981

Species of butterfly

Aslauga latifurca is a butterfly in the family Lycaenidae. It is found in Kenya, Malawi and Zambia.
