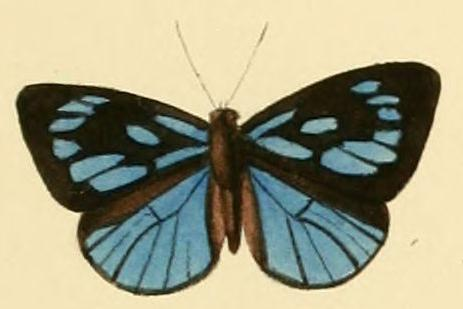

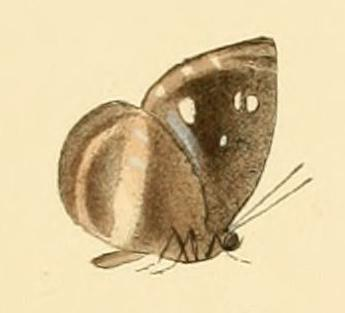

Scientific classification
- Kingdom: Animalia
- Phylum: Arthropoda
- Class: Insecta
- Order: Lepidoptera
- Family: Lycaenidae
- Genus: Hypophytala
- Species: H. hyetta

Binomial name
- Hypophytala hyetta (Hewitson, 1873)

Synonyms
- Phytala hyetta Hewitson, 1873; Phytala intermixta Aurivillius, 1898

= Hypophytala hyetta =

Species of butterfly

Hypophytala hyetta is a butterfly in the family Lycaenidae. It is found in Cameroon, the Republic of the Congo, the Central African Republic, Gabon, the Democratic Republic of the Congo, Angola, Uganda and Tanzania.

== Subspecies ==
- Hypophytala hyetta hyetta (Cameroon, Congo, Gabon, Democratic Republic of the Congo, Angola)
- Hypophytala hyetta latifascia Libert & Collins, 1999 (Central African Republic)
