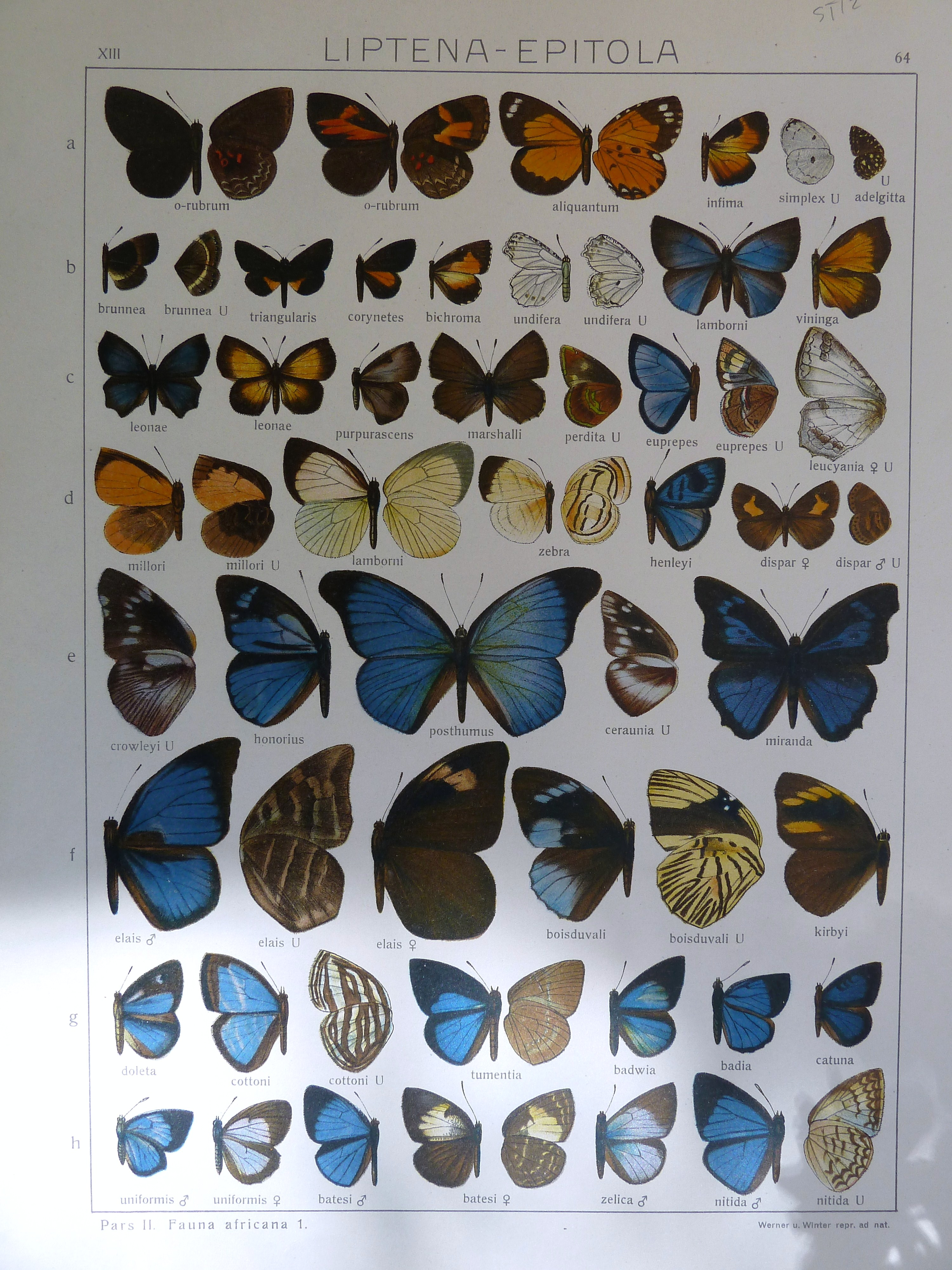
- in Seitz c

Scientific classification
- Domain: Eukaryota
- Kingdom: Animalia
- Phylum: Arthropoda
- Class: Insecta
- Order: Lepidoptera
- Family: Lycaenidae
- Genus: Aslauga
- Species: A. marshalli

Binomial name
- Aslauga marshalli Butler, 1899

Synonyms
- Aslauga purpurascens marginaria Talbot, 1937

= Aslauga marshalli =

Dusky purple

Species of butterfly

Aslauga marshalli, the dusky purple, is a butterfly in the family Lycaenidae. It is found in Cameroon, Angola, the Democratic Republic of the Congo, Burundi, Uganda, Kenya, Tanzania, Malawi, Zambia, Mozambique, Zimbabwe and possibly Nigeria. The habitat consists of savanna, Brachystegia-Julbernardia woodland, marshes and shallow lakes.

Adults have been recorded on wing year-round.

== Subspecies ==
- Aslauga marshalli marshalli (Angola, Democratic Republic of the Congo: Lualaba and Shaba, Burundi, Uganda, Kenya, Tanzania, Malawi, Zambia, Mozambique: Dondo Forest, Zimbabwe: Harare)
- Aslauga marshalli adamaoua Libert, 1994 (Cameroon, possibly Nigeria)
