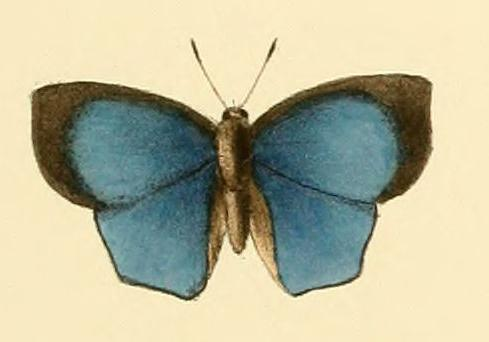

Scientific classification
- Domain: Eukaryota
- Kingdom: Animalia
- Phylum: Arthropoda
- Class: Insecta
- Order: Lepidoptera
- Family: Lycaenidae
- Genus: Aslauga
- Species: A. vininga

Binomial name
- Aslauga vininga (Hewitson, 1875)

Synonyms
- Liphyra vininga Hewitson, 1875; Deloneura marginata Plötz, 1880; Epitola subfulvida Holland, 1890; Aslauga leonae Aurivillius, 1920

= Aslauga vininga =

Central aslauga

Species of butterfly

Aslauga vininga, the central aslauga, is a butterfly in the family Lycaenidae. It is found in Nigeria, Cameroon, Equatorial Guinea (Bioko), Gabon, the Republic of the Congo, the Democratic Republic of the Congo, Tanzania and Zambia.

Adults have been recorded on wing in March.

The larvae are carnivorous and have been found feeding on Dactylopius longispinus and Lecanium punctuliferum var. lamborni and are associated with the ant species Crematogater buchneri race laurenti.

== Subspecies ==
- Aslauga vininga vininga (eastern Nigeria, Cameroon, Equatorial Guinea: Bioko, Gabon, Congo, Democratic Republic of the Congo: Tshopo, Tshuapa, Sankuru and Lualaba)
- Aslauga vininga kiellandi Libert, 1997 (north-western Tanzania, Zambia)
