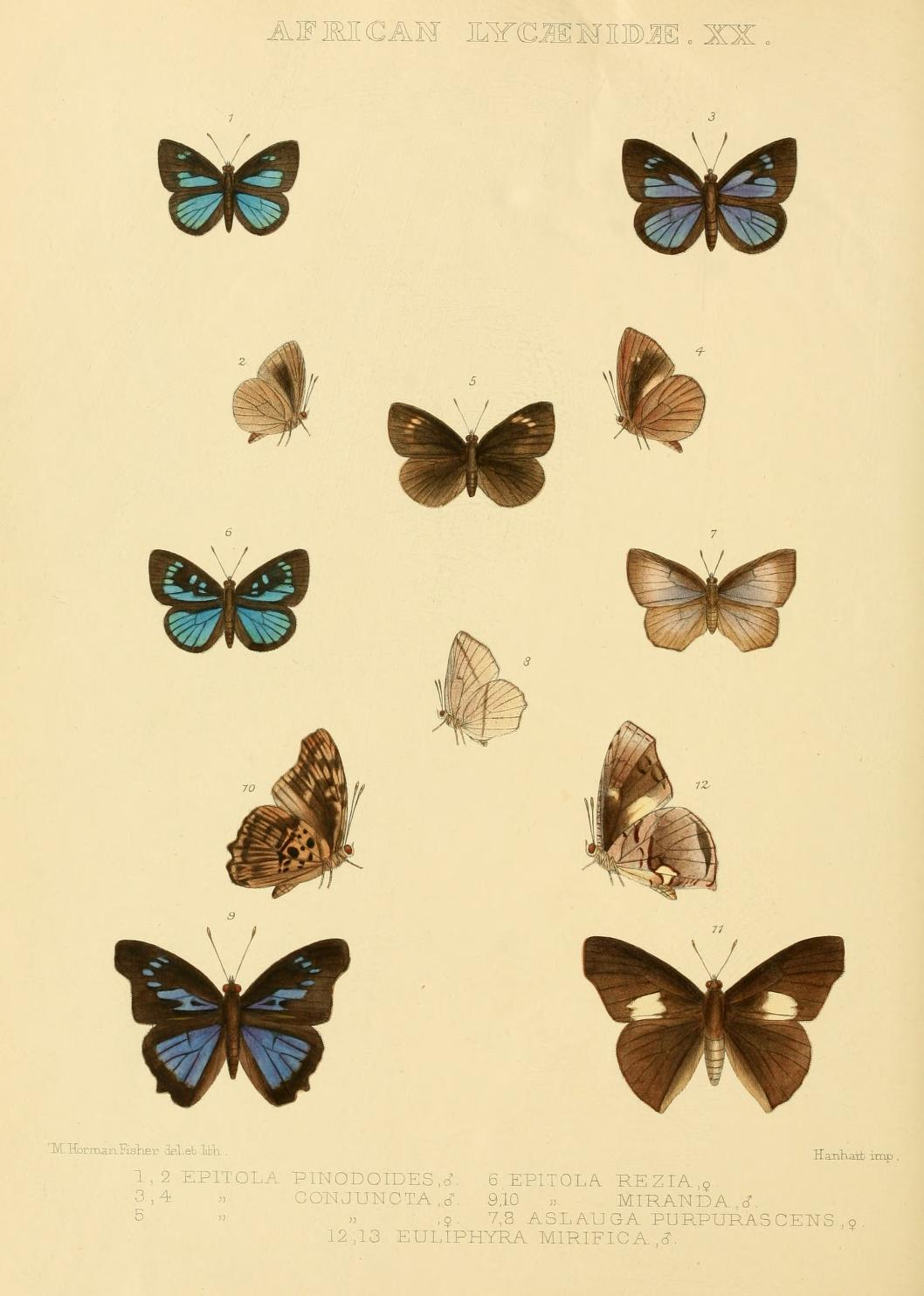
- Figure 6

Scientific classification
- Domain: Eukaryota
- Kingdom: Animalia
- Phylum: Arthropoda
- Class: Insecta
- Order: Lepidoptera
- Family: Lycaenidae
- Genus: Hypophytala
- Species: H. benitensis

Binomial name
- Hypophytala benitensis (Holland, 1890)

Synonyms
- Epitola benitensis Holland, 1890; Phytala benitensis; Epitola rezia Grose-Smith & Kirby, 1893; Phytala schultzei Aurivillius, 1923

= Hypophytala benitensis =

Species of butterfly

Hypophytala benitensis, the Holland's flash, is a butterfly in the family Lycaenidae. It is found in Ivory Coast, Ghana, Togo, Nigeria, Cameroon, Gabon, the Republic of the Congo, the Central African Republic and Tanzania. The habitat consists of forests.

== Subspecies ==
- Hypophytala benitensis benitensis (Ivory Coast, Ghana, Togo, Nigeria: south and the Cross River loop, Cameroon, Gabon, Congo, Central African Republic)
- Hypophytala benitensis minziro Libert & Collins, 1999 (Minziro forest, north-western Tanzania)
