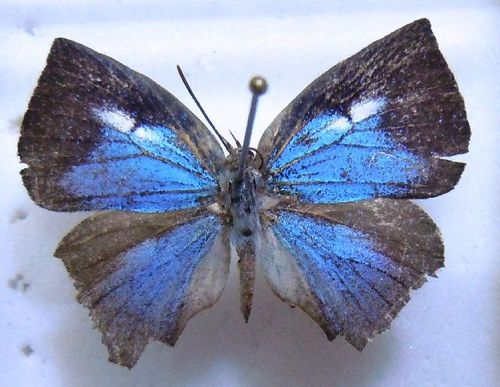

Scientific classification
- Kingdom: Animalia
- Phylum: Arthropoda
- Class: Insecta
- Order: Lepidoptera
- Family: Lycaenidae
- Genus: Aslauga
- Species: A. bella

Binomial name
- Aslauga bella Bethune-Baker, 1913

= Aslauga bella =

Species of butterfly

Aslauga bella, the large blue aslauga, is a butterfly in the family Lycaenidae. It is found in Nigeria and Cameroon.
