= Hypophytala vansomereni =

Scientific classification
- Domain: Eukaryota
- Kingdom: Animalia
- Phylum: Arthropoda
- Class: Insecta
- Order: Lepidoptera
- Family: Lycaenidae
- Genus: Hypophytala
- Species: H. vansomereni

Binomial name
- Hypophytala vansomereni (Jackson, 1964)

Synonyms
- Phytala vansomereni Jackson, 1964

Species of butterfly

Hypophytala vansomereni is a butterfly in the family Lycaenidae. It is found in the Democratic Republic of the Congo, western Uganda and north-western Tanzania. The habitat consists of forests.
