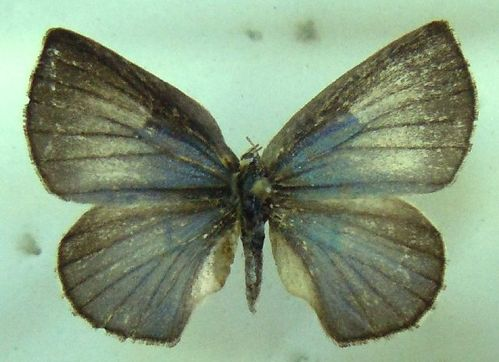

Scientific classification
- Kingdom: Animalia
- Phylum: Arthropoda
- Clade: Pancrustacea
- Class: Insecta
- Order: Lepidoptera
- Family: Lycaenidae
- Genus: Aslauga
- Species: A. imitans

Binomial name
- Aslauga imitans Libert, 1994

= Aslauga imitans =

Species of butterfly

Aslauga imitans, the imitating aslauga, is a butterfly in the family Lycaenidae. It is found in Ghana (the Volta Region), western Cameroon and the Democratic Republic of the Congo (the Pania Forest).

Torben Larsen developed a species numbering system for his 2005 publication Butterflies of West Africa. This species is #124. The 'Larsen' numbers have since been used with permission in A Sharp Eye on Butterflies of Ghana.
