= Aslauga camerunica =

Scientific classification
- Domain: Eukaryota
- Kingdom: Animalia
- Phylum: Arthropoda
- Class: Insecta
- Order: Lepidoptera
- Family: Lycaenidae
- Genus: Aslauga
- Species: A. camerunica

Binomial name
- Aslauga camerunica Stempffer, 1969

Species of butterfly

Aslauga camerunica, the Cameroon aslauga, is a butterfly in the family Lycaenidae. It is found in Nigeria and Cameroon. The habitat consists of forests.
