= Aslauga satyroides =

Scientific classification
- Kingdom: Animalia
- Phylum: Arthropoda
- Class: Insecta
- Order: Lepidoptera
- Family: Lycaenidae
- Genus: Aslauga
- Species: A. satyroides

Binomial name
- Aslauga satyroides Libert, 1994

Species of butterfly

Aslauga satyroides is a butterfly in the family Lycaenidae. It is found in Cameroon.
