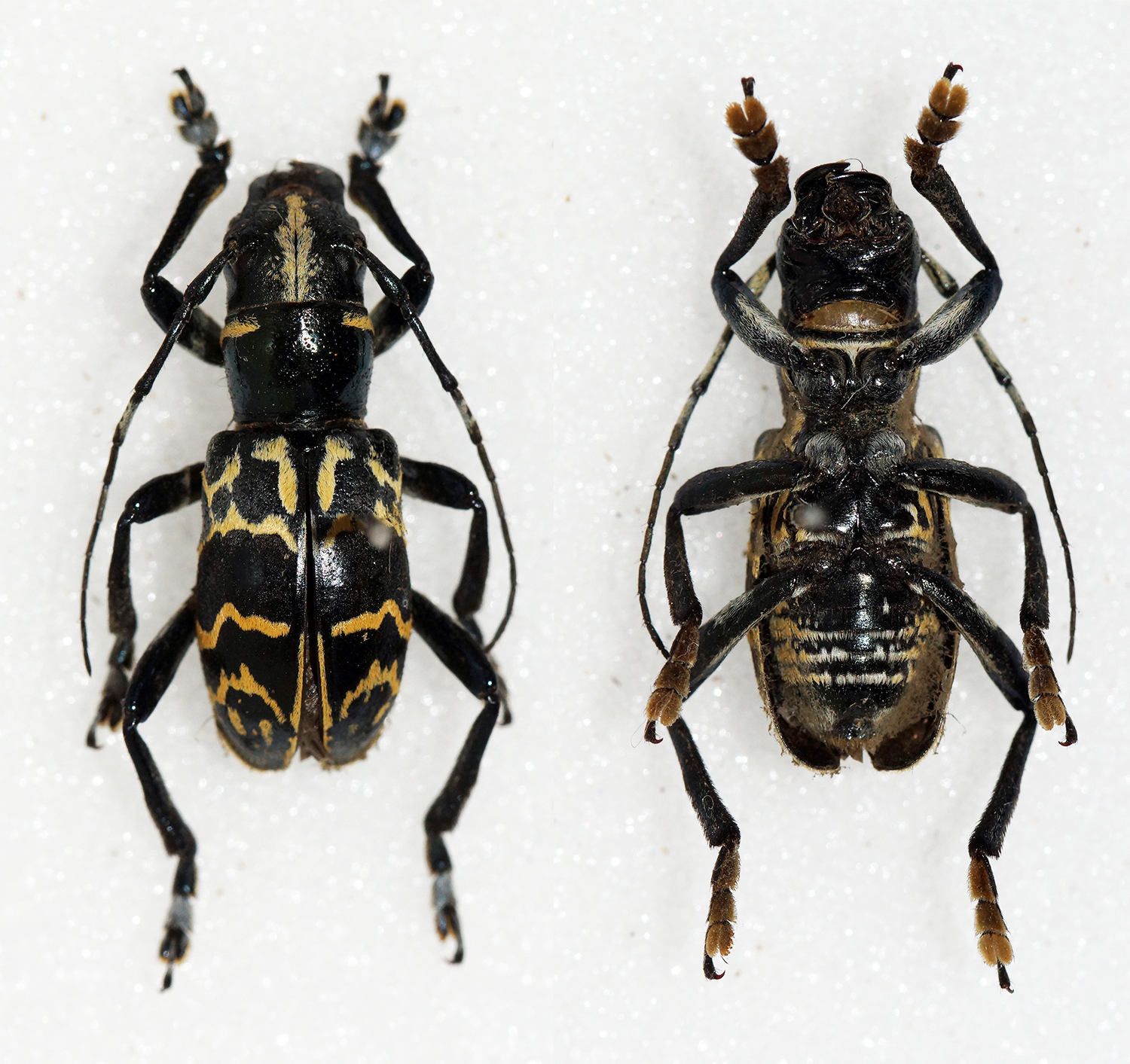
- Pseudabryna hieroglyphica

Scientific classification
- Kingdom: Animalia
- Phylum: Arthropoda
- Class: Insecta
- Order: Coleoptera
- Suborder: Polyphaga
- Infraorder: Cucujiformia
- Family: Cerambycidae
- Subfamily: Lamiinae
- Tribe: Pteropliini
- Genus: Pseudabryna; Schultze, 1916

= Pseudabryna =

Genus of beetles

Pseudabryna is a genus of longhorn beetles of the subfamily Lamiinae, containing the following species:

- Pseudabryna aurorana (Vives, 2009)
- Pseudabryna hieroglyphica Schultze, 1934
- Pseudabryna luzonica Schultze, 1916
- Pseudabryna quatuordecimmaculata (Breuning, 1947)
