= Aslauga pandora =

Scientific classification
- Domain: Eukaryota
- Kingdom: Animalia
- Phylum: Arthropoda
- Class: Insecta
- Order: Lepidoptera
- Family: Lycaenidae
- Genus: Aslauga
- Species: A. pandora

Binomial name
- Aslauga pandora H. H. Druce, 1913

Species of butterfly

Aslauga pandora is a butterfly in the family Lycaenidae first described by Hamilton Herbert Druce in 1913. It is found in Cameroon, the Republic of the Congo, the Democratic Republic of the Congo (Uele, Sankuru, Ituri and Kasai) and Uganda (Unyoro).
