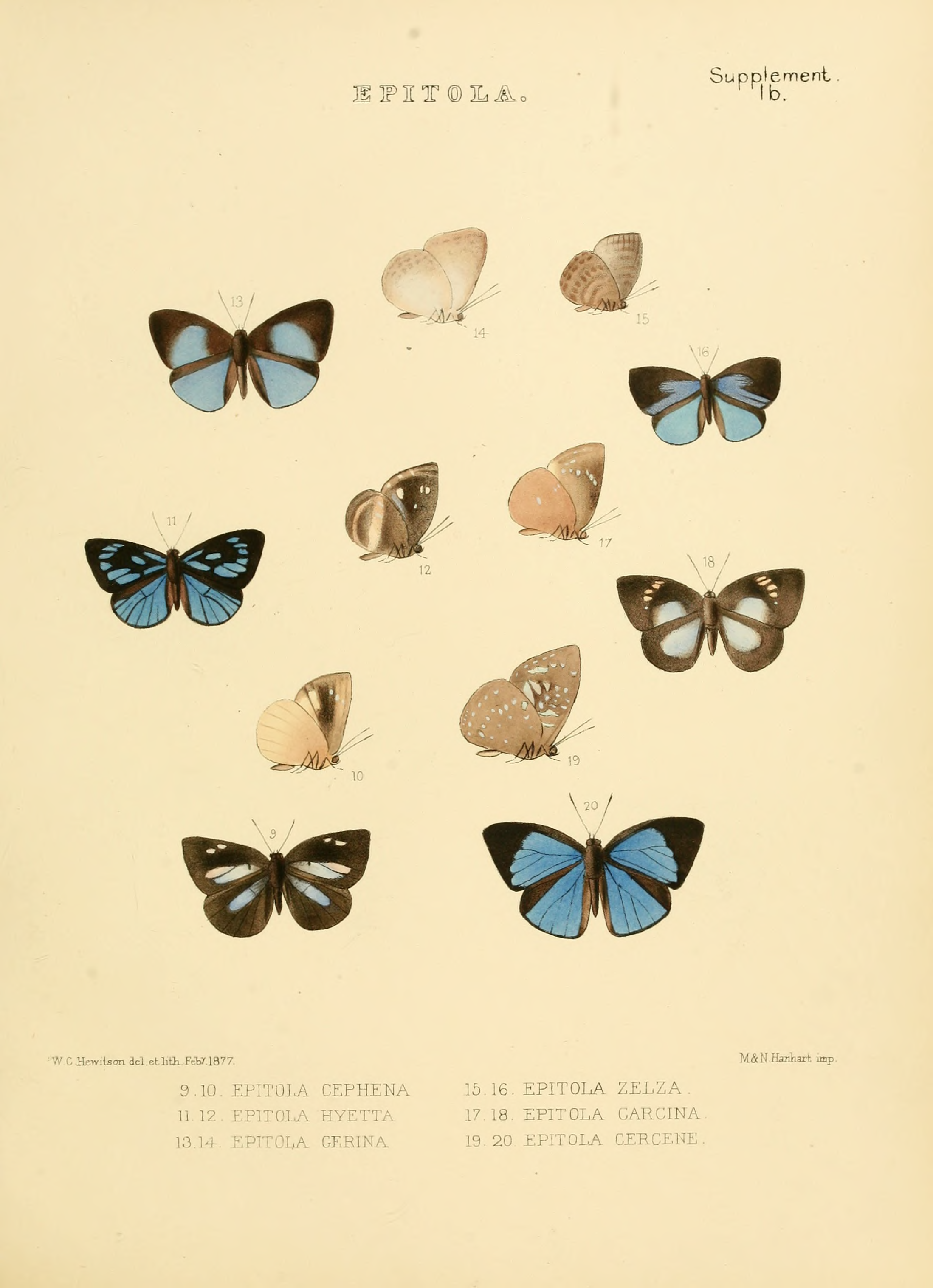
- Hypophytala hyetta figures 11 and 12

Scientific classification
- Kingdom: Animalia
- Phylum: Arthropoda
- Clade: Pancrustacea
- Class: Insecta
- Order: Lepidoptera
- Family: Lycaenidae
- Subfamily: Poritiinae
- Genus: Hypophytala; Clench, 1965

= Hypophytala =

Butterfly genus in family Lycaenidae

Hypophytala is a genus of butterflies in the family Lycaenidae. The species of this genus are endemic to the Afrotropical realm.

== Species ==
- Hypophytala benitensis (Holland, 1890)
- Hypophytala henleyi (Kirby, 1890)
- Hypophytala hyetta (Hewitson, 1873)
- Hypophytala hyettina (Aurivillius, 1898)
- Hypophytala hyettoides (Aurivillius, 1895)
- Hypophytala nigrescens (Jackson, 1964)
- Hypophytala obscura (Schultze, 1916)
- Hypophytala reducta (Aurivillius, 1923)
- Hypophytala ultramarina Libert & Collins, 1999
- Hypophytala vansomereni (Jackson, 1964)
