= Acronia luzonica =

Scientific classification
- Kingdom: Animalia
- Phylum: Arthropoda
- Class: Insecta
- Order: Coleoptera
- Suborder: Polyphaga
- Infraorder: Cucujiformia
- Family: Cerambycidae
- Genus: Acronia
- Species: A. luzonica

Binomial name
- Acronia luzonica Schultze, 1934

Synonyms
- Acronia (Reductomaculipenna) luzonica – Özdikmen, 2025

Species of beetle

Acronia luzonica is a species of beetle in the family Cerambycidae. It is endemic to Luzon, the Philippines.

Acronia luzonica measure 19 mm (0.75 in) in length.
