= Pterolophia guineensis =

Scientific classification
- Kingdom: Animalia
- Phylum: Arthropoda
- Clade: Pancrustacea
- Class: Insecta
- Order: Coleoptera
- Suborder: Polyphaga
- Infraorder: Cucujiformia
- Family: Cerambycidae
- Genus: Pterolophia
- Species: P. guineensis

Binomial name
- Pterolophia guineensis (Thomson, 1864)

Synonyms
- Pterolophia obscuritarsis Breuning, 1938; Pterolophia flavescens Breuning, 1938; Pterolophia ovata Breuning, 1938; Pterolophia leonensis Breuning, 1938; Alyattes guineensis Thomson, 1864

Species of beetle

Pterolophia guineensis is a species of beetle in the family Cerambycidae. It was described by James Thomson in 1864, originally under the genus Alyattes.

== Subspecies ==
- Pterolophia guineensis ugandicola Breuning, 1963
- Pterolophia guineensis guineensis (Thomson, 1864)
