= Anauxesida guineensis =

Scientific classification
- Kingdom: Animalia
- Phylum: Arthropoda
- Class: Insecta
- Order: Coleoptera
- Suborder: Polyphaga
- Infraorder: Cucujiformia
- Family: Cerambycidae
- Genus: Anauxesida
- Species: A. guineensis

Binomial name
- Anauxesida guineensis Breuning, 1966

Species of beetle

Anauxesida guineensis is a species of beetle in the family Cerambycidae. It was described by Breuning in 1966.
