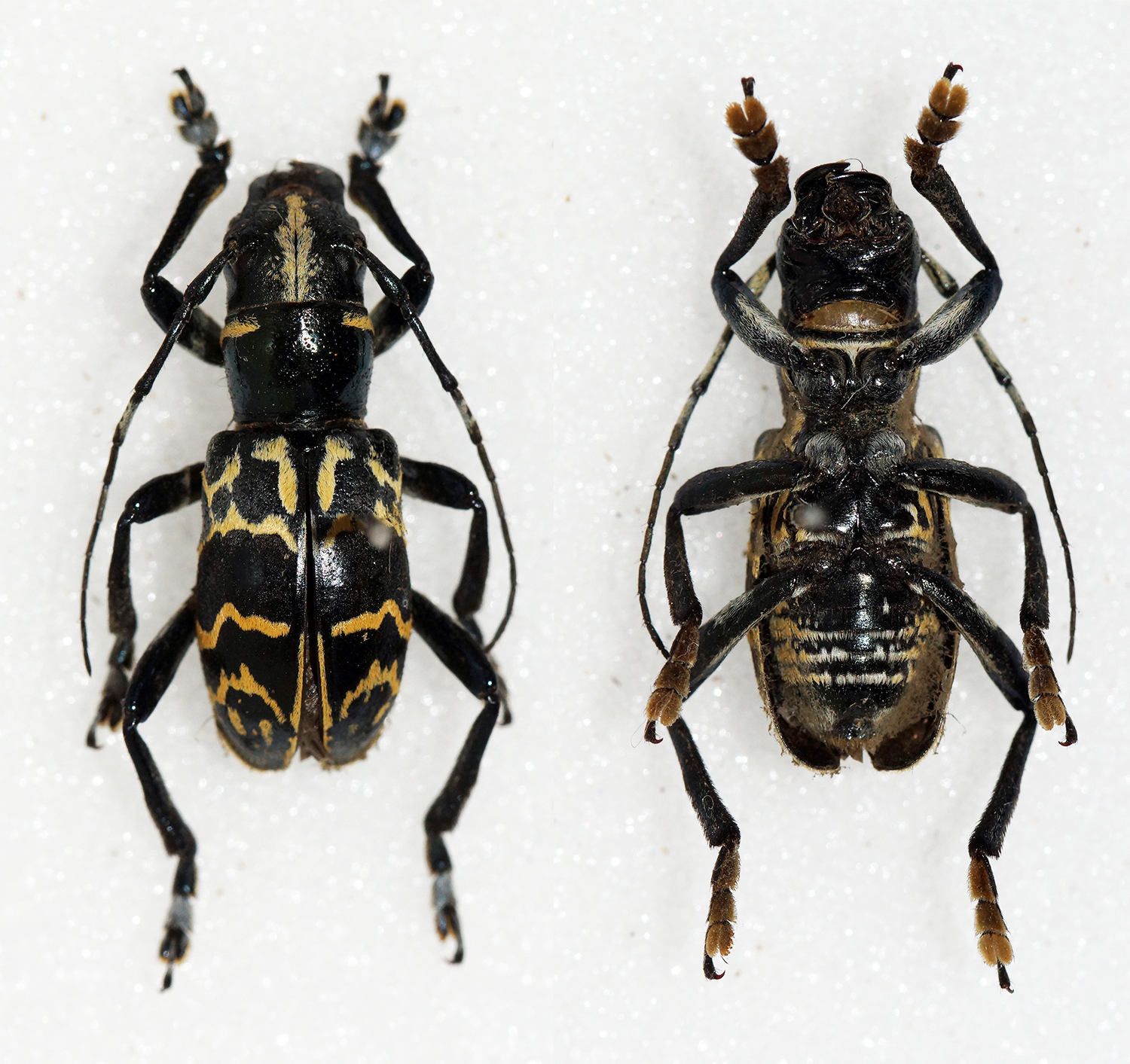

Scientific classification
- Kingdom: Animalia
- Phylum: Arthropoda
- Class: Insecta
- Order: Coleoptera
- Suborder: Polyphaga
- Infraorder: Cucujiformia
- Family: Cerambycidae
- Genus: Pseudabryna
- Species: P. hieroglyphica

Binomial name
- Pseudabryna hieroglyphica Schultze, 1934

Synonyms
- Aprophata hieroglyphica Vives, 2009

= Pseudabryna hieroglyphica =

Species of beetle

Pseudabryna hieroglyphica is a species of beetle in the family Cerambycidae. It was described by Schultze in 1934. It is known from the Philippines.
