= Abacetus guineensis =

Scientific classification
- Domain: Eukaryota
- Kingdom: Animalia
- Phylum: Arthropoda
- Class: Insecta
- Order: Coleoptera
- Suborder: Adephaga
- Family: Carabidae
- Genus: Abacetus
- Species: A. guineensis

Binomial name
- Abacetus guineensis Straneo, 1940

Species of beetle

Abacetus guineensis is a species of ground beetle in the subfamily Pterostichinae. It was described by Straneo in 1940.
