= Pseudabryna quatuordecimmaculata =

Scientific classification
- Kingdom: Animalia
- Phylum: Arthropoda
- Class: Insecta
- Order: Coleoptera
- Suborder: Polyphaga
- Infraorder: Cucujiformia
- Family: Cerambycidae
- Genus: Pseudabryna
- Species: P. quatuordecimmaculata

Binomial name
- Pseudabryna quatuordecimmaculata Breuning, 1947

Synonyms
- Aprophata quatuordecimmaculata Breuning, 1947

Species of beetle

Pseudabryna quatuordecimmaculata is a species of beetle in the family Cerambycidae. It was described by Stephan von Breuning in 1947. It is known from the Philippines.
