= Aslauga guineensis =

Scientific classification
- Domain: Eukaryota
- Kingdom: Animalia
- Phylum: Arthropoda
- Class: Insecta
- Order: Lepidoptera
- Family: Lycaenidae
- Genus: Aslauga
- Species: A. guineensis

Binomial name
- Aslauga guineensis Collins & Libert, 1997

Species of butterfly

Aslauga guineensis, the Guinea aslauga, is a butterfly in the family Lycaenidae. It is found in Guinea.
