= Arnold Schultze =

German officer, geographer, and entomologist

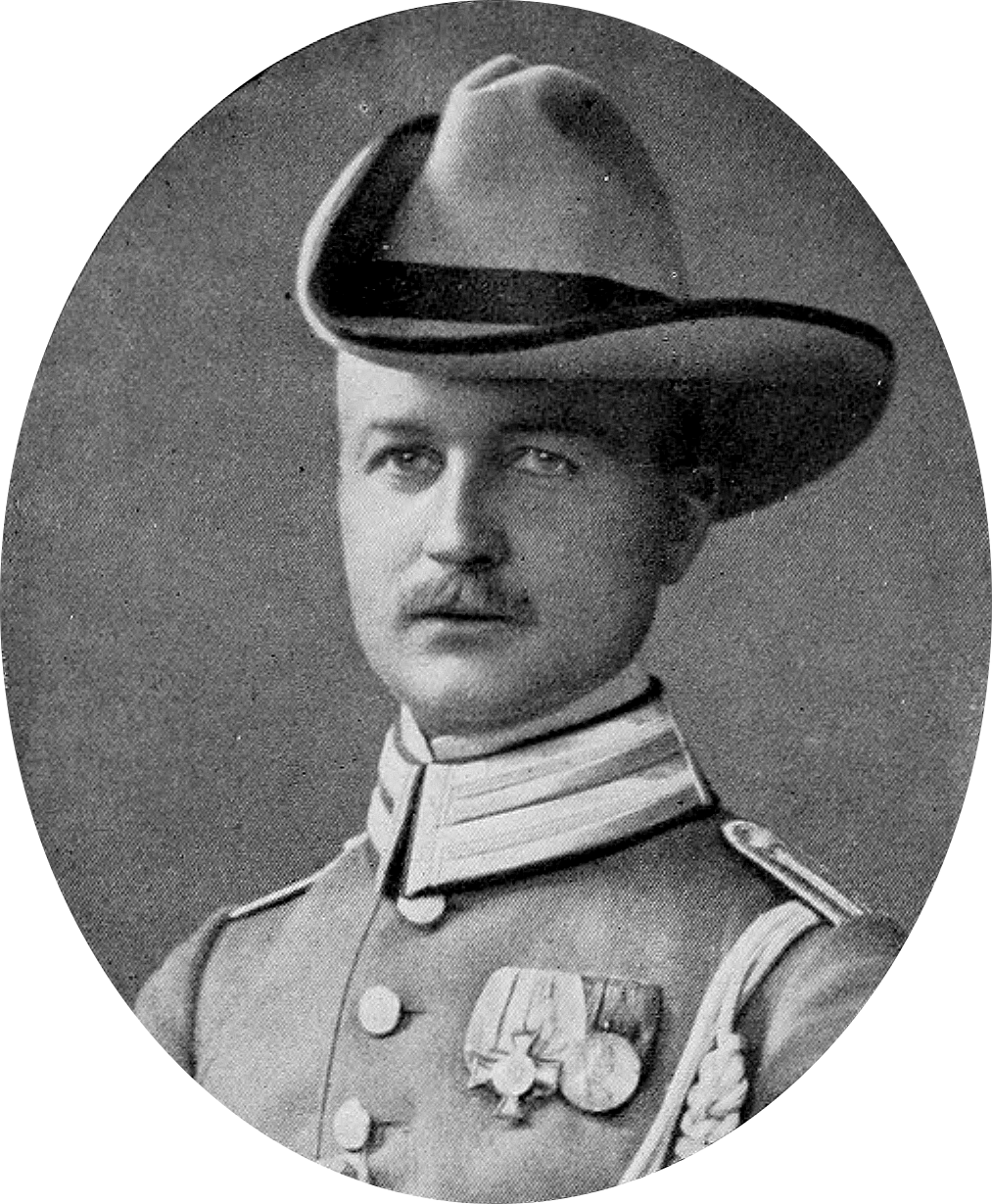
Arnold Schultze

Arnold Schultze (24 March 1875 – 22 August 1948) was a German officer, geographer, and entomologist who specialised in Lepidoptera.

His 1916 collections of African Rhopalocera (1916) are in the State Museum of Natural History Stuttgart. Later collections of Lepidoptera from Colombia (1920, 1926 and 1927), Ubangi, Congo (1929 and 1931), Cameroon and Lake Chad (1932) and Ecuador (1935 and 1939) are in the Natural History Museum in Berlin.

== Publications ==
Partial list

- 1920 Lepidoptera. 11. Teil. Ergebnisse. der Zweiten Deutschen Zentral Afrika Expedition. 2910-11. Vol. 1, Part 14, pp. 639–837
- 1929. Die ersten Stände von drei kolumbianischen hochandinen Satyriden. Deutsche Entomologische Zeitschrift Iris, 43: 157-165, tfl. 3
- 1931 Die ersten Stande von zwei Heteroceren aus Aequatorial Afrika. Dtsch. Entomol. Z. Iris., 45: 140.143.

Full list at African Butterfly Database (Bibliography)
