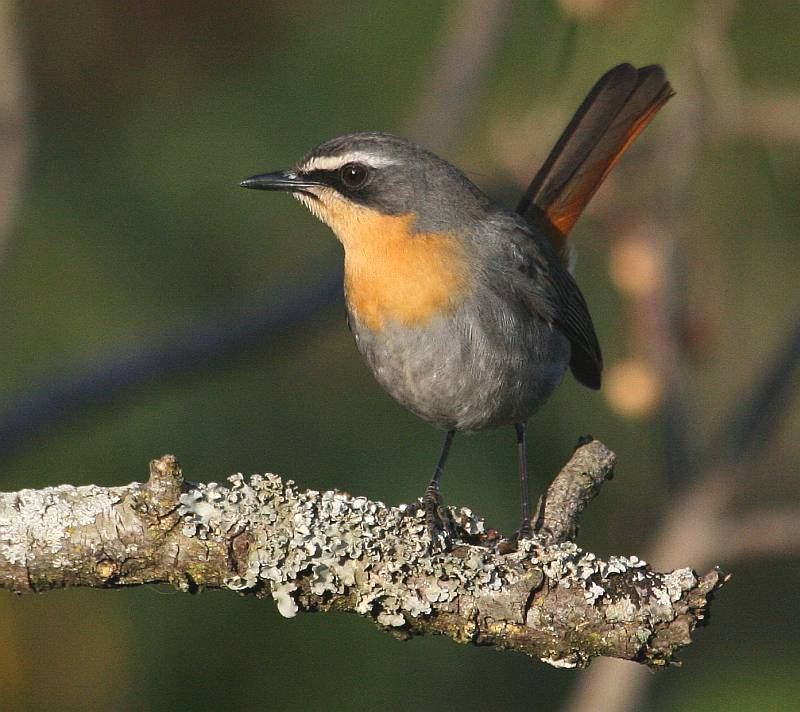
- In Pietermaritzburg, South Africa
- Singing at dawn before sunrise

Conservation status
- Least Concern (IUCN 3.1)

Scientific classification
- Kingdom: Animalia
- Phylum: Chordata
- Class: Aves
- Order: Passeriformes
- Family: Muscicapidae
- Genus: Dessonornis
- Species: D. caffer

Binomial name
- Dessonornis caffer (Linnaeus, 1771)
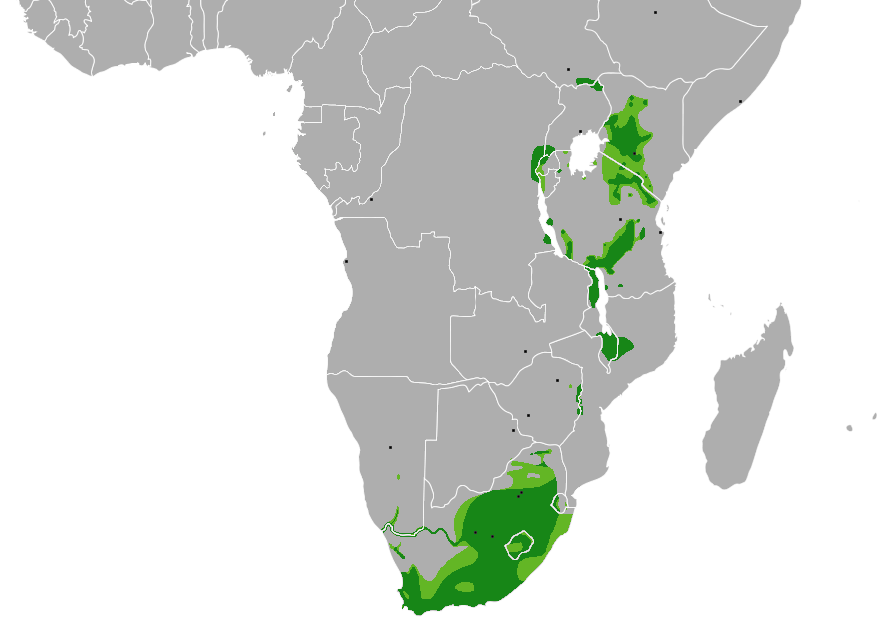
- range

= Cape robin-chat =

Species of bird

The Cape robin-chat (Dessonornis caffer) is a small passerine bird of the Old World flycatcher family Muscicapidae. It has a disjunct range from South Sudan to South Africa.

The locally familiar and confiding species has colonized and benefited from a range of man-altered habitats, including city suburbs and farmstead woodlots. It is an accomplished songster like other robin-chats, but is rather less colourful than most, and frequents either drier settings or higher altitudes. It forages in the proximity of cover, in the open or in fairly well-lit environments. Its distribution resembles that of the karoo–olive complex of thrushes, but it prefers the bracken-briar fringes of Afromontane forest, and does not enter far into forest proper. It is altitudinally segregated from the red-capped robin-chat, and is less of a skulker.

== Taxonomy ==
The Cape robin-chat was formally described in 1771 by the Swedish naturalist Carl Linnaeus under the binomial name Motacilla caffra. He specified the type locality as the Cape of Good Hope. The specific epithet caffra is Modern Latin for South Africa. The Cape robin-chat was formerly assigned to the genus Cossypha but is now one of four species placed in the genus Dessonornis that was introduced in 1836 by Andrew Smith.

=== Subspecies ===
Four geographically isolated subspecies are generally accepted, though Clancey (1980, 1981) distinguished several additional races with contiguous ranges.

- D. c. iolaemus (Reichenow, 1900) – south South Sudan to Malawi and north Mozambique

Widespread in Kenya, Tanzania and east Uganda. Easterly locations include Mount Marsabit, the Taita Hills, East Usambaras and the East African montane forests, southwards to Njombe, Songea, Mbeya and Ufipa. Westerly populations are present at Mount Elgon and nearby sites, besides the Marungu highlands in the eastern DRC

- D. c. kivuensis (Schouteden, 1937) – southwest Uganda, northwest Tanzania and DRC, along rift

Ankole and Kigezi regions in south Uganda, and at Ngara, northwest Tanzania

- D. c. namaquensis (W.L.Sclater, 1911) – Northern Cape and south Namibia

Especially in riparian vegetation of the lower Orange and Fish River regions
Somewhat larger than nominate, with broader white supercilium

- D. c. caffer (Linnaeus, 1771) – east Zimbabwe, South Africa, Eswatini and Lesotho

Up to 2,200 m in Zimbabwe, where it does not breed below 1,400 m. South of the Limpopo however, it utilizes a greater range of habitats and altitudes, from sea level to 3,000 m, and is locally sympatric with red-capped and white-throated robin-chats.
Compared to D. c. iolaema it is slightly larger, less blackish on the head, with paler upper part plumage, less intense orange on breast, and greyer plumage below. Flanks still greyer in the far south, and chest plumage yellower.

== Description ==
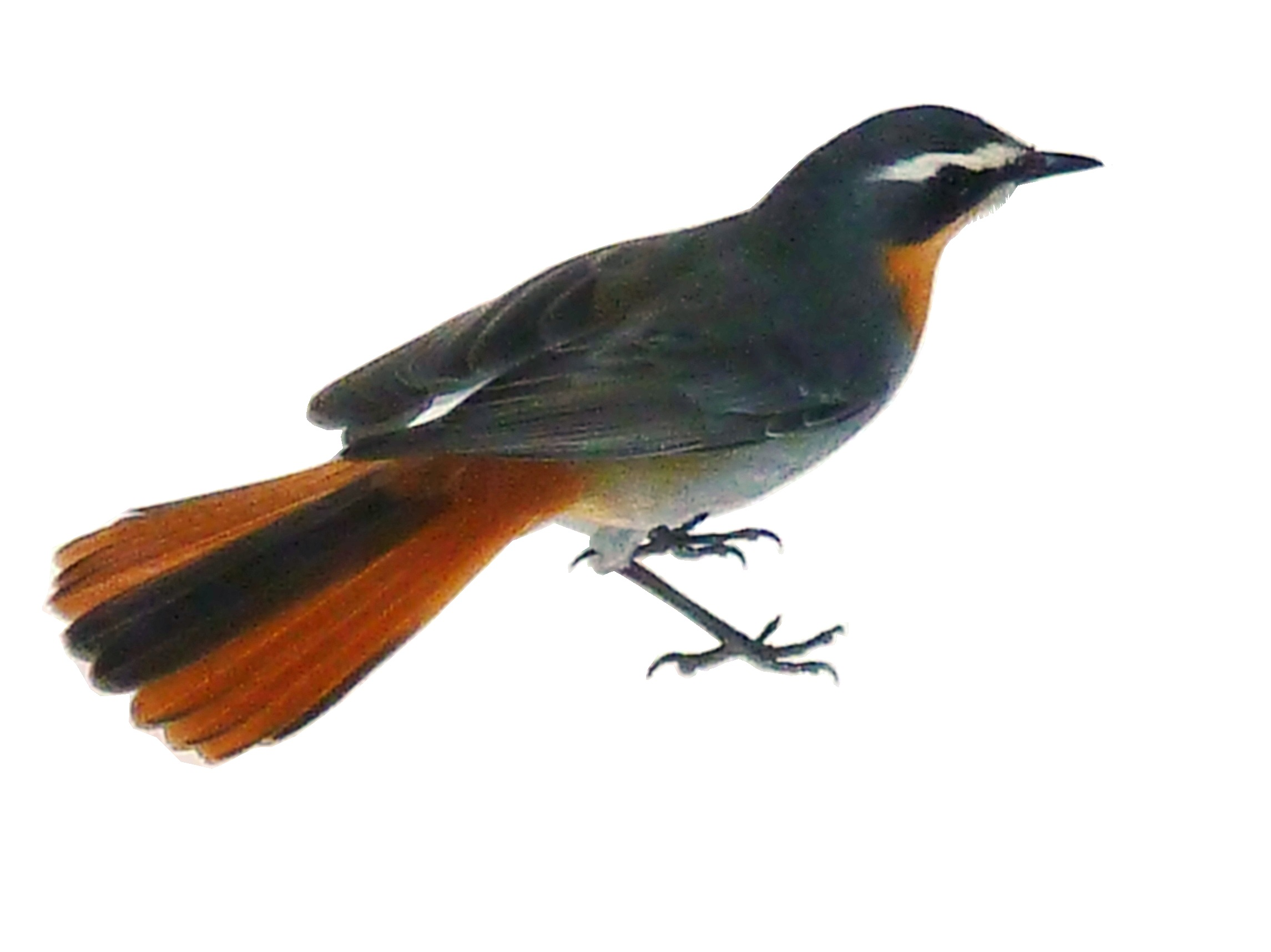
The expanded tail reveals the greyish brown central, and rufous lateral rectrices.

The sexes are similar. The Cape robin-chat measures 16–17 cm from bill tip to tail tip and weighs 28 g. The adult's upper parts are grey, with the mantle and secondary feathers tinged brownish olive. The blackish lores and ear coverts are separated from the crown by a prominent white supercilium. The chin, throat, central breast, rump, upper tail coverts and outer tail feathers are orange. The breast plumage moults to a deeper orange in colour for the non-breeding season. The central tail feathers are greyish-brown, and obscures the bright rufous outer tail feathers when the tail is closed. The belly is pale grey to white, and the undertail coverts buffy. The short, black bill is fairly straight, but with a slightly down-curved upper mandible. The legs and feet are black, and the eye is brown.

Juveniles have tails like the adults, but lack a supercilium. They are dark brown above and buff below, heavily marked with buff on the upper parts and grey-brown on the breast. The legs and feet are pinkish grey, and unlike other robin-chats, the soles of their feet are yellow. Immatures are like adults but retain some buff-tipped greater wing coverts.

=== Calls and song ===
Trisyllabic guttural calls when arriving at a roost at dusk

The Cape robin-chat has a harsh, low, trisyllabic alarm call, which may be rendered as WA-dur-dra, WA-de-da or TURR-da-da. It has given rise to several local names, including "Jan frederik", which matches the rhythm of the call if the last syllables are run together. This call is also given year-round when arriving at, or departing from a roost.

The clear and ringing song is delivered in a series of short phrases, sometimes simultaneously by competing males. Singing peaks at dawn and dusk, and consists of passages of whistled syllables, cherooo-weet-weet-weeeet, followed by a pause. Each passage, consisting of 4 to 10 syllables, starts with a low, slurred whistle, which is followed by an improvised succession of whistled notes. From first light they usually sing from within, but near the top of a tree or bush, and at times uninterrupted for an hour or more. Singing may continue late into the evening, in pitch darkness. Males interrupt their singing during post-breeding moult. In the absence of her mate, females are said to sing equally well.

Anxious birds utter a plaintive, descending peeeeeuu note, for instance when their nestlings are threatened. Like other robin-chats, they may mimic other birds. One individual has been noted to mimic a total of 36 bird species.

== Distribution and habitat ==
The Cape robin-chat occurs from South Sudan (mainly Imatong Mts, above 1,600 m) southwards to Uganda, the DRC (1,800 m – 3,475 m), Kenya, Tanzania, Zambia (above 1,800 m), Malawi (where common above 1,500 m), Zimbabwe, Namibia, South Africa, Eswatini and Lesotho. It is a mainly resident breeder in eastern and southern Africa, though some adults and juveniles may migrate more than 100 km to lower, warmer regions in winter. In their winter refuges, they may coexist with several other species of robin. Some are however year-round residents even at high altitudes. A five-year tenure of a breeding territory by the same pair is commonplace, and the maximum recorded life span is over 16 years.

In southern Africa, the Cape robin-chat is a common species at Afromontane forest edges, in forest scrub and ravines, fynbos, karoo, plantations, gardens and parks. Most areas with dense cover with scattered trees or song posts are however suitable. In dry areas they are restricted to thickets that fringe water courses. In southern Africa it is found from sea level up to 3,000 m where Leucosidea provides cover. It is absent from arid Karoo and Kalahari.

In tropical East Africa, the Cape robin-chat likewise frequents forest edge and gardens, but is restricted to the uplands. It occurs at 1,100 m in the Ulugurus, but generally upwards of 1,500 m in Uganda and the remainder of Tanzania, and above 1,800 m in Kenya. The tropical races are also at home at the edges of bamboo, in woodland, scrub, tea and coffee plantations, or in association with giant heather beside moorland streams, up to 3,400 m in altitude.

== Behaviour ==
The Cape robin-chat moves about singly with a hopping gait, and often perches in prominent positions. It also roosts singly up to 3 metres aboves ground, in dense cover. The tail is regularly jerked up to an angle of 60 degrees, and upon alighting it may flick the wings and rapidly fan the tail. It bathes daily, even in tide pools.

=== Food and feeding ===
Generally, the Cape robin-chat forages close to or on ground level, but will on occasion glean bark and foliage in tall trees. It prefers the cover of vegetation, but is not very shy. Invertebrates, small frogs and lizards are obtained in scrub or on leaf litter. In addition fruit and seeds are plucked from plants or eaten on the ground. Occasionally an insect may be hawked in the air, or invertebrates may be gleaned from leaves, branches or rocks.

=== Breeding ===
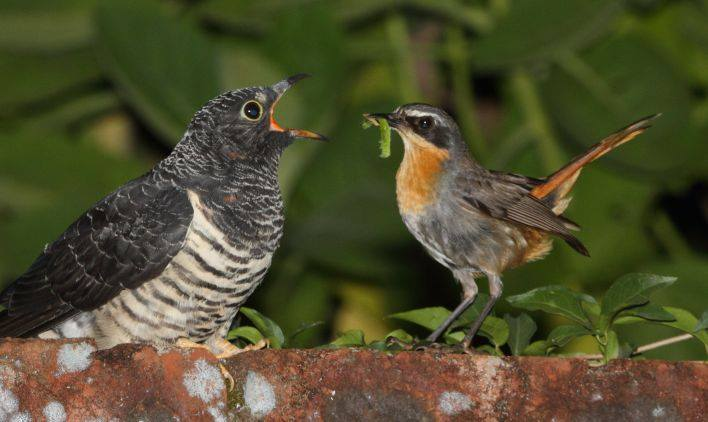
Cape robin-chat (at right) feeding a red-chested cuckoo parasite chick

The Cape robin-chats are monogamous and highly territorial nesters. A pair's territory usually comprises some fraction of a hectare, but its extent varies considerably depending on the habitat. The nest site is within 5 feet (regularly 0 – 2 feet) from the ground. It may be placed against a tree trunk, or on a broken stump in drift wood, and is often screened by overhanging vegetation.

The Cape robin-chat normally nests from June to November in the Western Cape and August to January elsewhere, but may nest at any time of the year. One of the pair will dowse its belly feathers and use the moisture to soften nesting material for easy shaping of the nest, while the other will bring the material to the nest. The female builds the cup-shaped nest of coarse vegetation, lined with animal hair, rootlets and other fine material. It is completed in 6 to 14 days, except when a nest is refurbished for a second clutch.

Two to three eggs are laid at one day intervals, and are incubated by the female for 14 to 19 days. The eggs measure 13 x 17 mm, and may be off-white, pinkish or pale blue, but always flecked with rusty brown, especially near the thicker end. Both parents will feed the nestlings during the subsequent 14 to 18 days, and for 5 to 7 weeks after they leave nest.

First breeding can occur at two years of age, but typically later, as potential territories are usually occupied. The Cape robin-chat is a host of the red-chested cuckoo. Predators often raid the nests, and replacement nests are common.

== Gallery ==
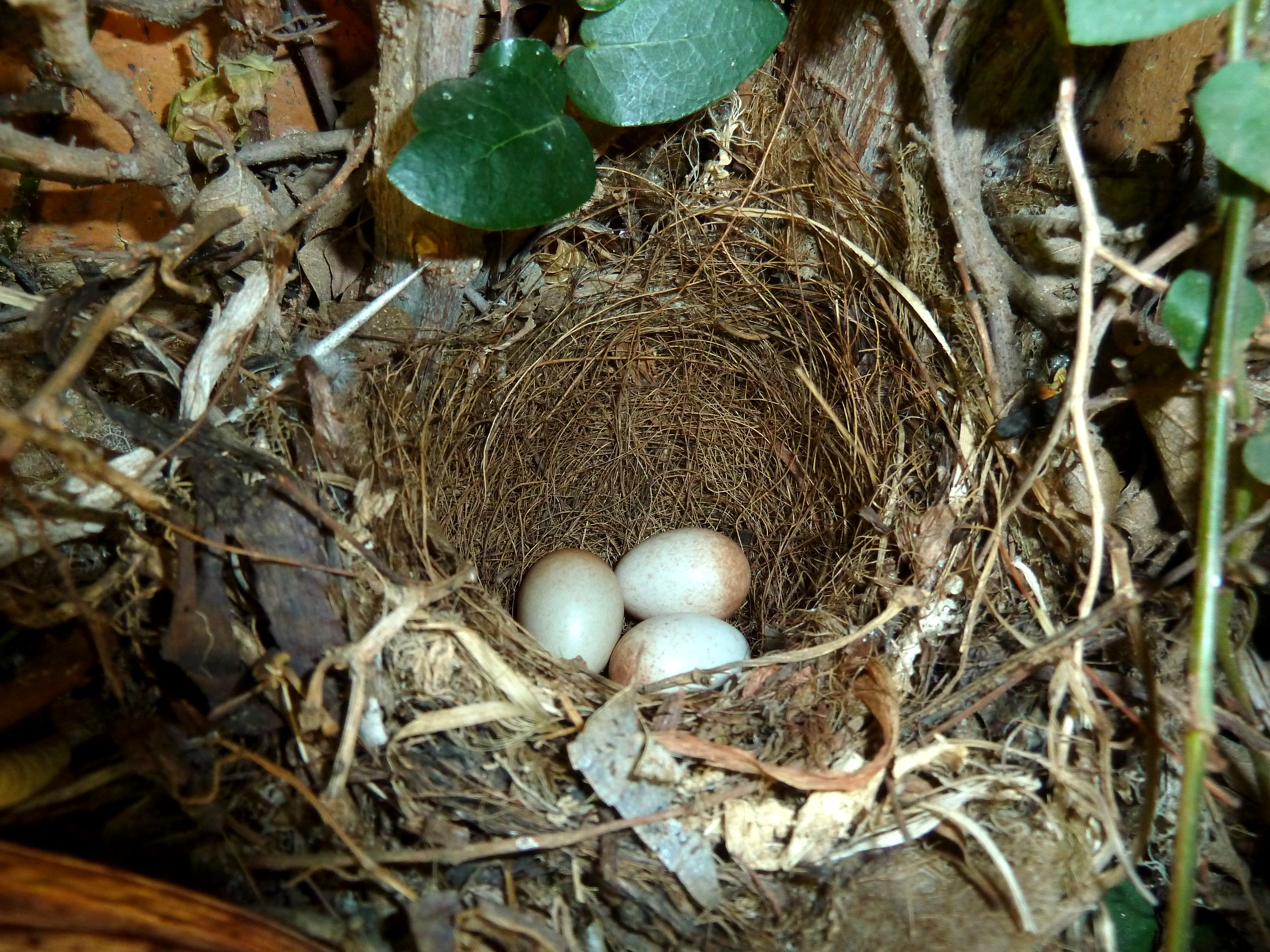
Nest with clutch of three placed in a creeping fig

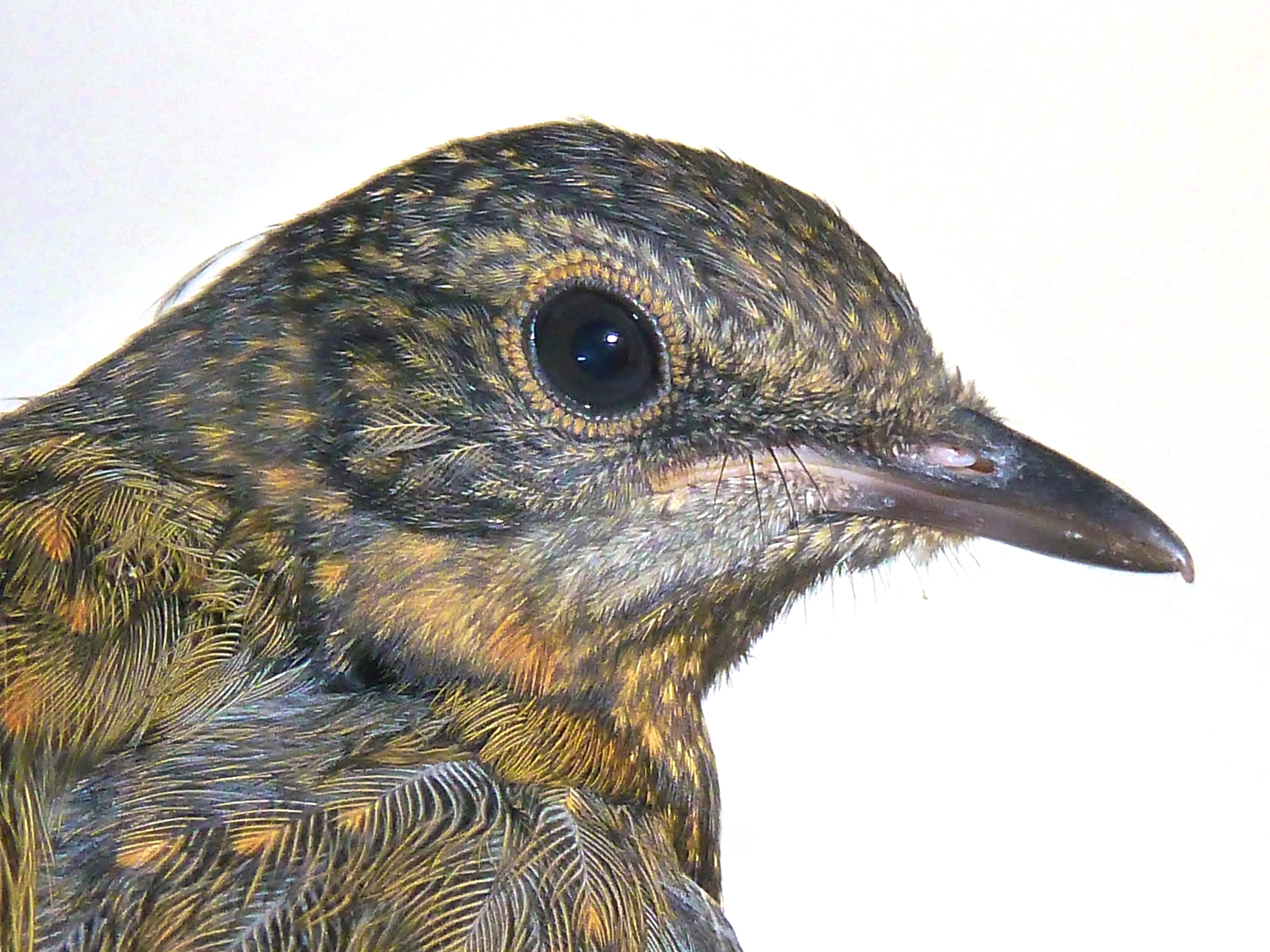
The dappled juvenile lacks a clear supercilium

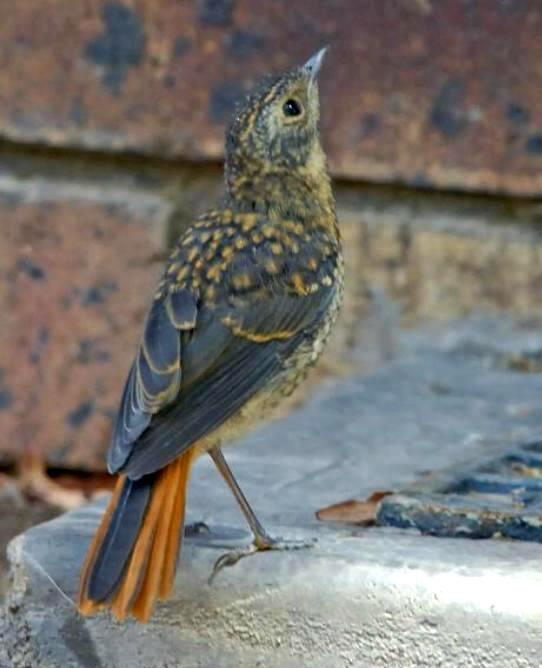
Juvenile, showing dappled plumage

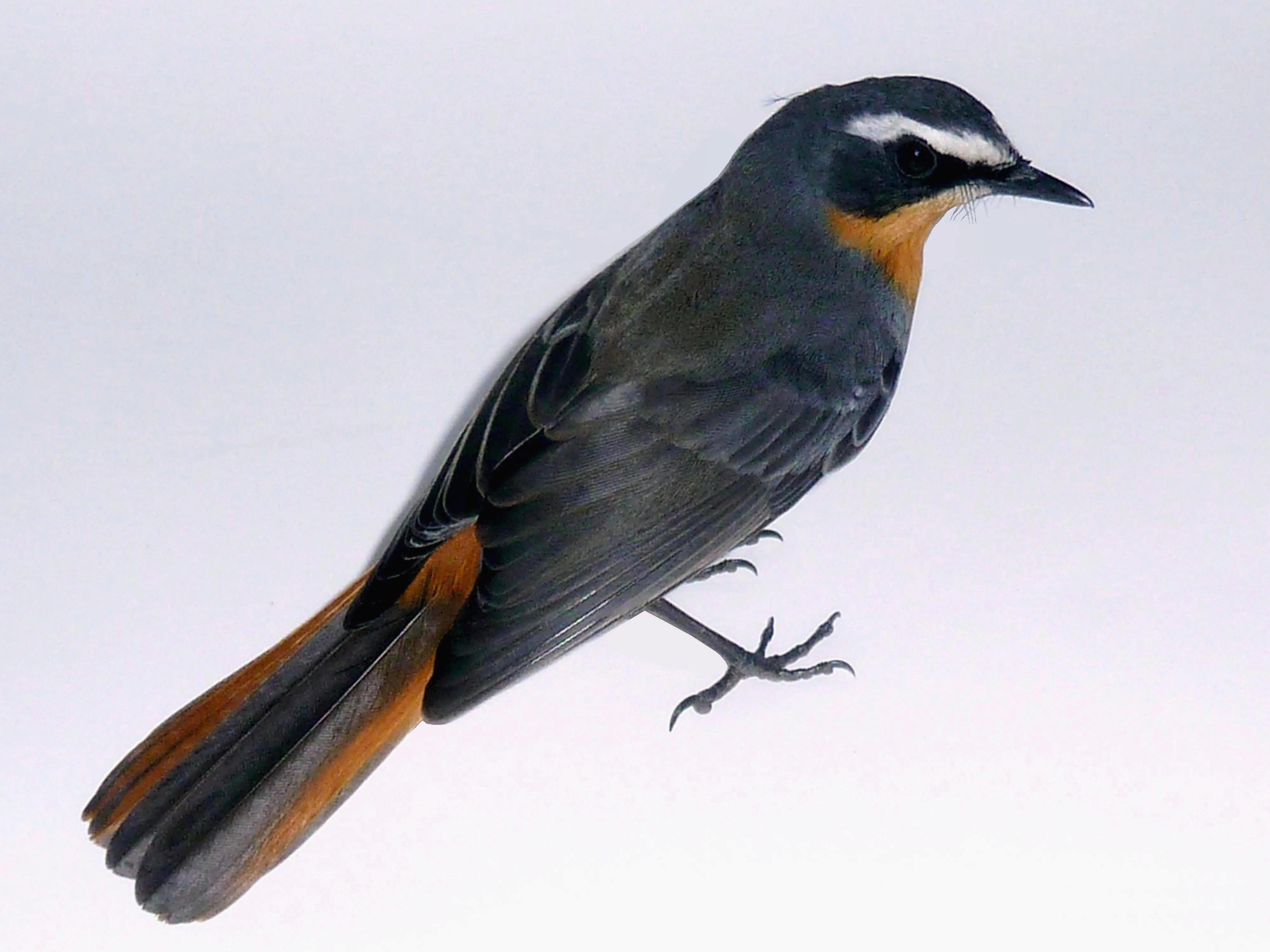
Adult, showing grey and rufous upper parts
