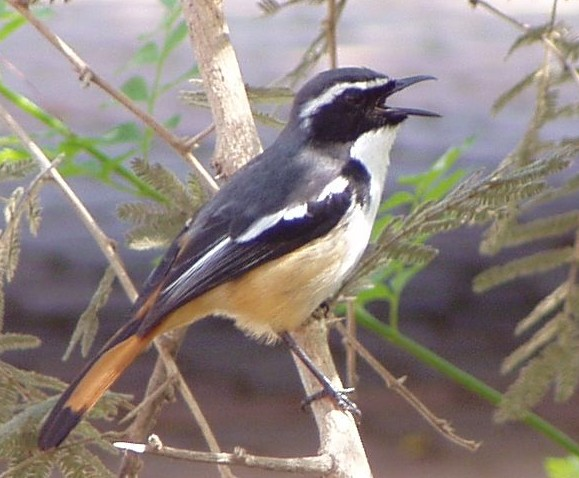

Conservation status
- Least Concern (IUCN 3.1)

Scientific classification
- Kingdom: Animalia
- Phylum: Chordata
- Class: Aves
- Order: Passeriformes
- Family: Muscicapidae
- Genus: Dessonornis
- Species: D. humeralis

Binomial name
- Dessonornis humeralis Smith, A, 1836
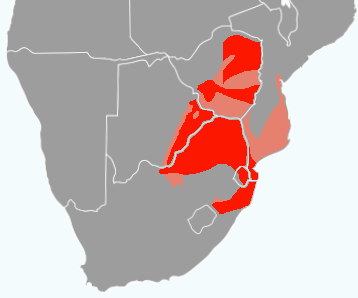
- resident range strongholds lower density

Synonyms
- Cossypha humeralis

Audio

= White-throated robin-chat =

Species of bird

The white-throated robin-chat or white-throated robin (Dessonornis humeralis) is a species of bird in the family Muscicapidae. It is endemic to Botswana, Eswatini, Mozambique, South Africa, and Zimbabwe. Its natural habitats are dry savannah and subtropical or tropical dry shrubland.

== Habitat ==
The white-throated robin-chat is found in dry savannah woodland and shrubland.

== Behaviour ==
The white-throated robin-chat is mainly insectivorous but also eats small vertebrates and some plant material. Its diet includes beetles, termites, ants, crickets, caterpillars, bugs, spiders and millipedes. It also consumes the fruits of the woolly caper-bush (Capparis tomentosa), the tassel-berry (Antidesma venosum), the sand raisin (Grewia microthyrsa), the magic guarrie (Euclea divinorum) and the dune guarrie (Euclea racemosa).

== Breeding ==
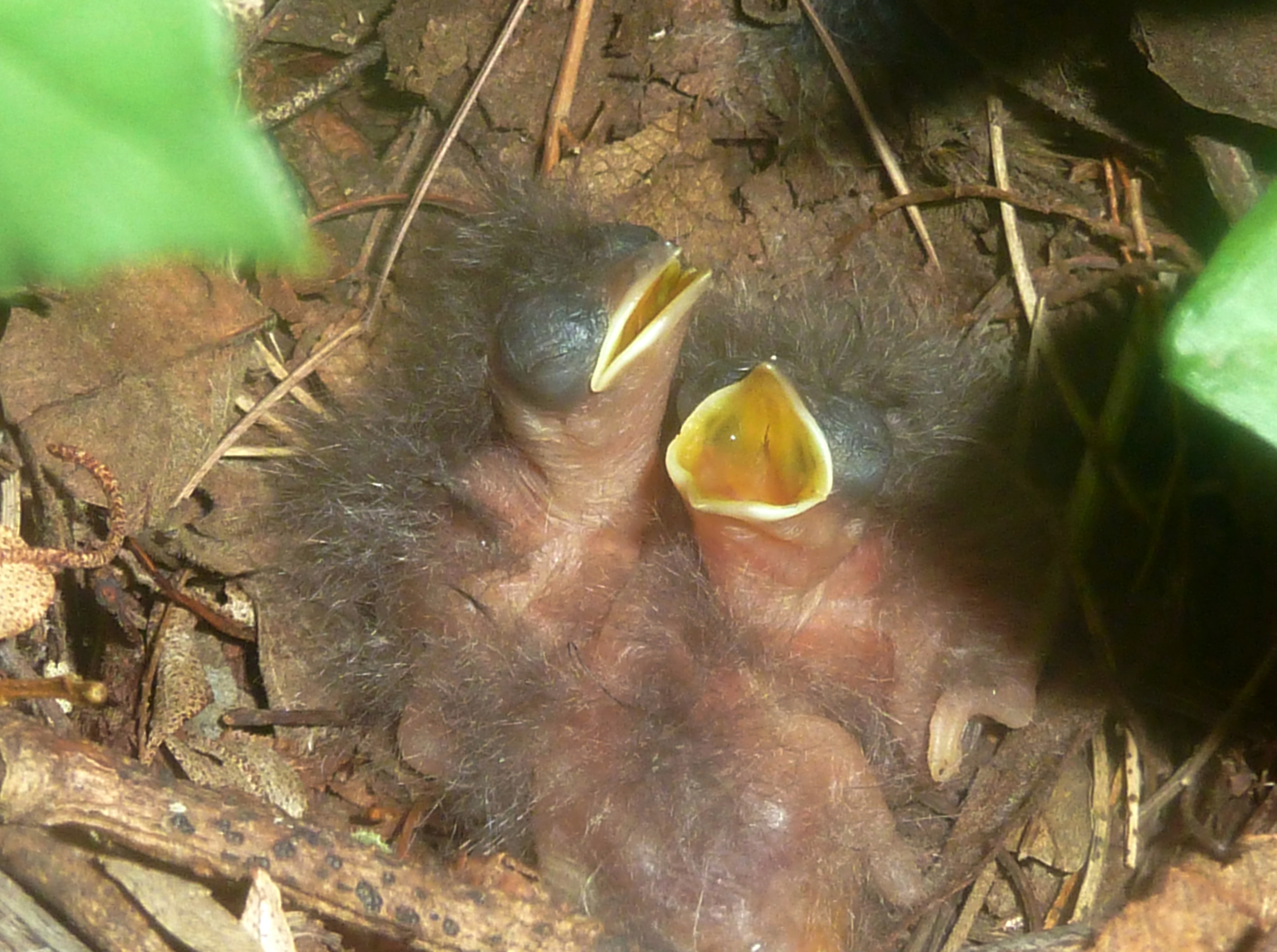
Nest with three chicks

Breeding takes place in the spring, principally in October and November. The nest is usually on or near the ground, in a hollow stump, near the root of a vine or in a discarded utensil. It is cup-shaped and composed of twigs, dry grasses and leaves and lined with rootlets, tendrils, stalks and fragments of leaves. There are usually two or three eggs and the incubation is done solely by the hen bird and lasts fourteen to fifteen days. Both parents feed the chicks, which leave the nest after about a fortnight but remain dependent on the adults for another six or seven weeks. The white-throated robin-chat is sometimes parasitised by the red-chested cuckoo.

== Status ==
The white-throated robin-chat is found in southern Africa. Its range includes parts of Botswana, Zimbabwe, Mozambique, Eswatini and South Africa and covers an area of approximately 645,000 square kilometres (249,000 sq mi). Its population has not been quantified but it is common in much of its range and the population appears to be stable, so the IUCN lists it as being of "Least Concern".
