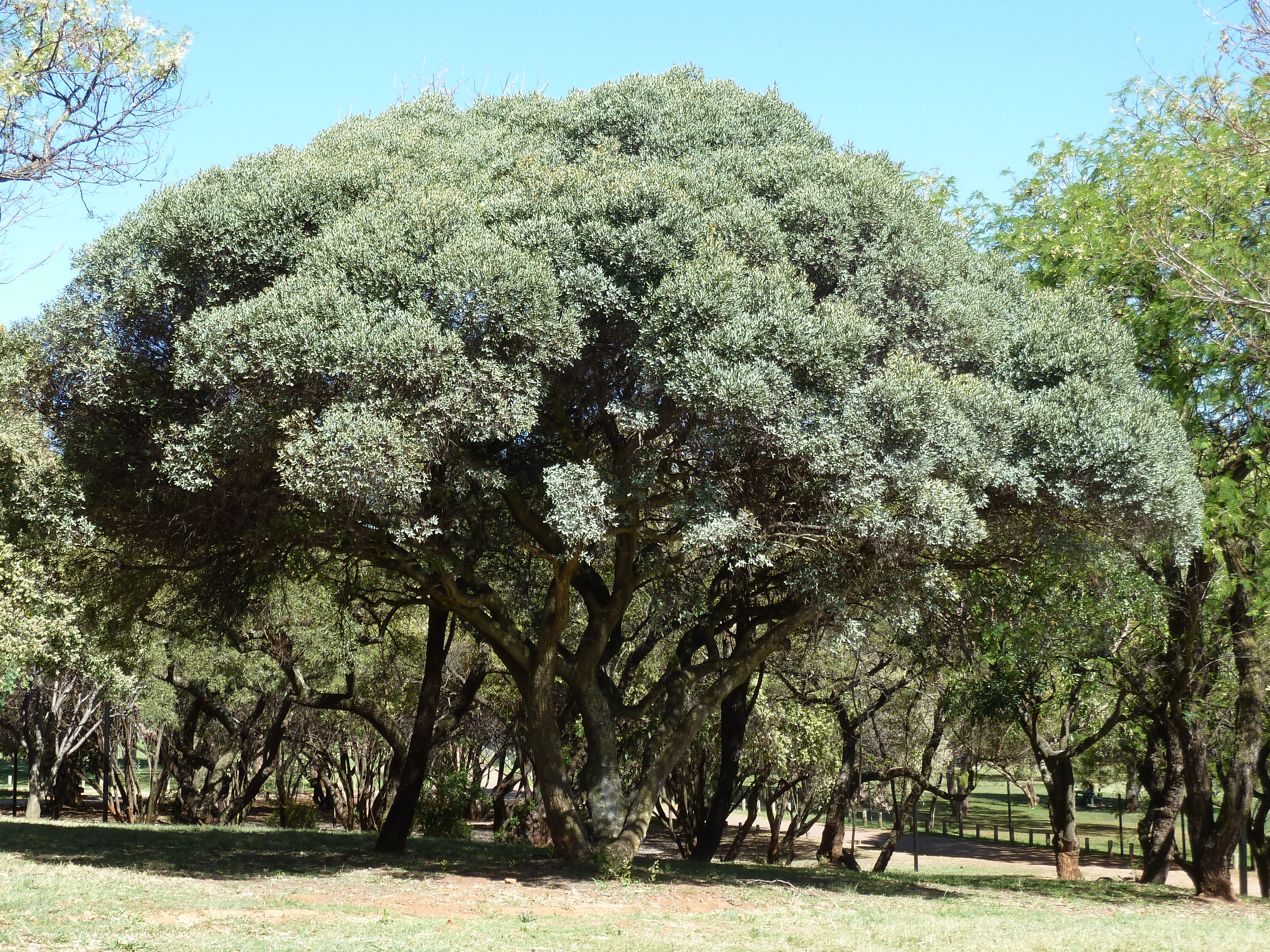

Conservation status
- Least Concern (IUCN 2.3)

Scientific classification
- Kingdom: Plantae
- Clade: Embryophytes
- Clade: Tracheophytes
- Clade: Spermatophytes
- Clade: Angiosperms
- Clade: Eudicots
- Clade: Asterids
- Order: Ericales
- Family: Ebenaceae
- Genus: Euclea
- Species: E. crispa

Binomial name
- Euclea crispa (Thunb.) Gürke

Synonyms
- Euclea lanceolata E.Mey. ex A.DC

= Euclea crispa =

Blue guarri

Species of tree

Euclea crispa, (Note: crispa = "curled", referring to the leaf margins that may be rolled under or wavy) commonly known as the blue guarri, (Note: The Khwe appelation "Gwarri" is also the origin of the Afrikaans and Xhosa loan words, "Ghwarrie" and "umGwali", respectively.) is an Afrotropical plant species of the family Ebenaceae. The hardy and evergreen plants may form a dense stand of shrubs, or grow to tree size. It is widespread and common in the interior regions of southern Africa, and occurs northward to the tropics. Though some are present near the South African south and east coasts, they generally occur at middle to high altitudes. It is readily recognizable from its much-branched structure and dull bluish foliage colour. Those bearing lanceolate leaves may however resemble the Wild olive, another common species of the interior plateaus.

== Range and habitat ==
It is native to central South Africa (where one of 35 native ebony species), Lesotho, Eswatini, the Zimbabwean plateau and Eastern Highlands, Angola, Zambia, Malawi and uplands of tropical Africa.

It is found in open or thick bush along stream banks, woodland, kloofs, hillsides, open forest, along forest margins and regularly in sheltered rocky places. It is rare in the lowveld where it is limited to rocky areas, or areas of higher rainfall.

== Habit ==
It is a rounded, dense and bushy shrub or tree, reaching a height of 2 to 6 metres (rarely 8 to 20 metres), with a spreading, often symmetrical crown. It is slow-growing like its congeners, and becomes frost and drought resistant with age. In Zimbabwe it is a shrub of 1 to 2 m tall, forming small, dense colonies, or a small tree.

== Description ==
=== Bole and bark ===
The bole is single or multi-stemmed and up to 30 cm in diameter. The wood is dark brown, hard and close-grained. The bark varies from grey to brown or blackish, and is smooth in young trees, but rougher in older trees.

=== Foliage ===
The plants carry a dense canopy of simple leaves of a dull grey-green colour and a rigid, leathery lineament. Variation in terms of colour, shape, texture and arrangement is however considerable. Foliage colour varies from a greyish green to distinctly blue, and the leaf shape varies from lanceolate to obovate. New branches and foliage are covered in rust-brown scales (gland granules), while mature leaves may be hairy or glabrous. Leaves may be opposite, sub-opposite or rarely alternate. The slender petiole is 1.5 to 2 mm long, and the leaves measure up to 5 x 1.5 cm. The leaf veins are clear and transparent against light, unlike the opaque venation of Wild olive trees. Leaves may also resemble those of the Natal guarri, a species of generally lower altitudes, but the latter's leaves have a finely hairy stalk.

=== Flowers ===
The fragrant flowers are produced in summer, from October to February. They are small, waxy, pendulous, yellow to greenish-white and borne in axillary pseudo-racemes, holding 3 to 10 flowers each. Their bell-shaped corollas are deeply lobed, and the ovaries are densely covered in bristles.

=== Fruit ===
The roundish, pea-sized berries (4 to 5 mm in diameter) are considered palatable when ripe. They are single-seeded and borne on female trees only. As they ripen, they turn from green to reddish brown, and eventually to black. They are somewhat or very hairy when green, but more or less glabrous when mature. Saplings can be grown quite easily from fresh, plump seed, that is sown soon after harvesting.

== Subspecies ==
var. crispa

- Range: very widely distributed in southern Africa
- Description: leaves variable but hardly wavy, broadly tapering with rounded apex, or acute apex with rounded tip, margins entire, and generally smaller and narrower than the next

var. ovata

- Range: eastern karroid regions (incl. Cradock and Middelburg) to Northern Cape (incl. Kimberley and Kuruman) and southern Free State
- Description: leaves wavy, much more ovate and sharply tapering, densely hairy when young, sometimes minutely scalloped, and hardly distinguishable from the Mountain guarri where they overlap

== Species interactions and uses ==
Lichens often grow on older bark. Bees are attracted to the sweet scent of the summer flowers, and larvae of the moths Ectoedemia crispae and Graphiocephala barbitias feed on the leaves. The fruit are eaten by birds and mammals, including antelope, vervet monkeys, mongooses and rats, while the bark and leaves are browsed by Black rhino. A dye extracted from the roots is used for baskets, mats and wool. A medicinal infusion of the root is also used for various ailments, and the fruit or bark are used as a purgative.

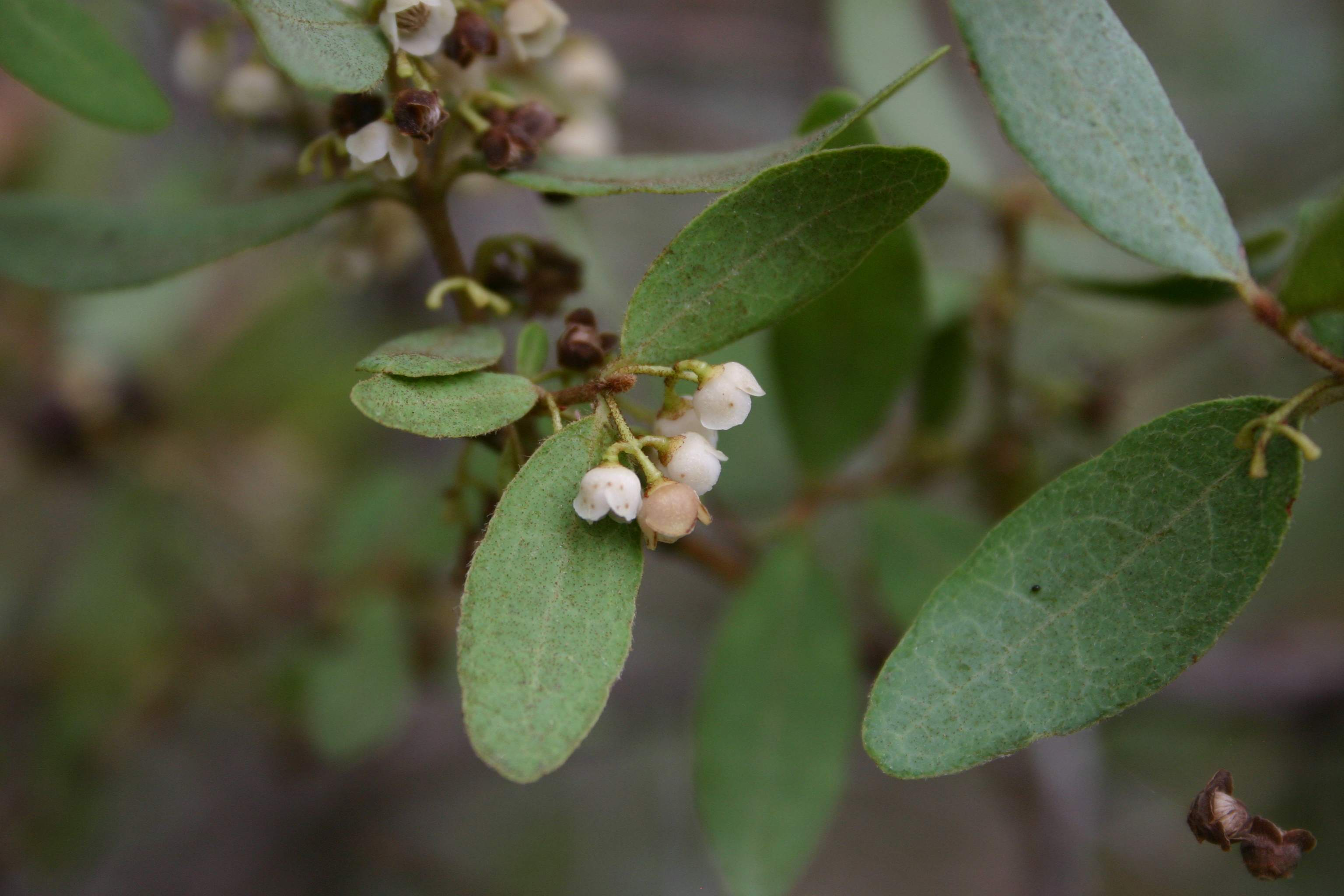
Foliage and bell-like flowers

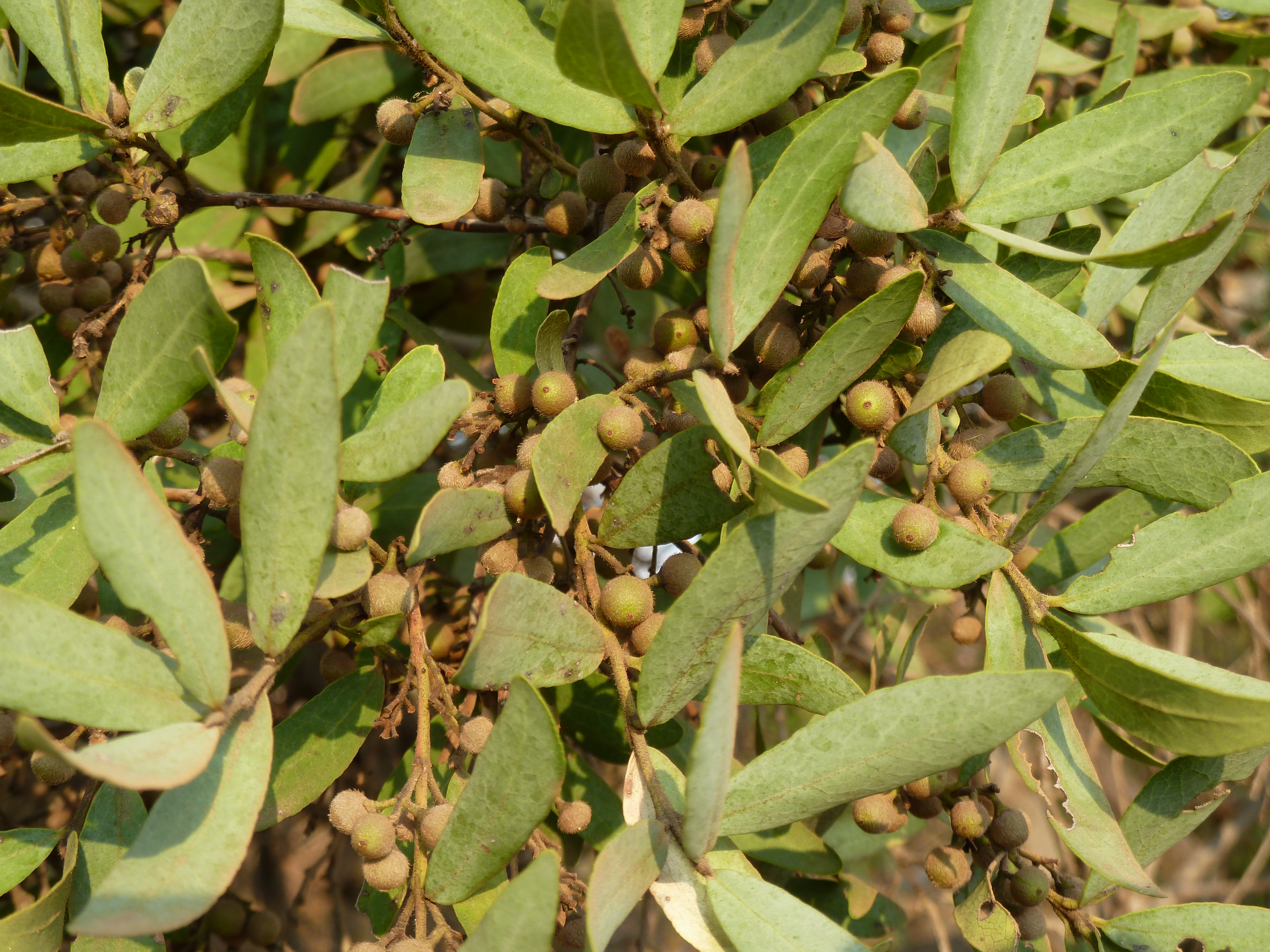
Green berries on female tree

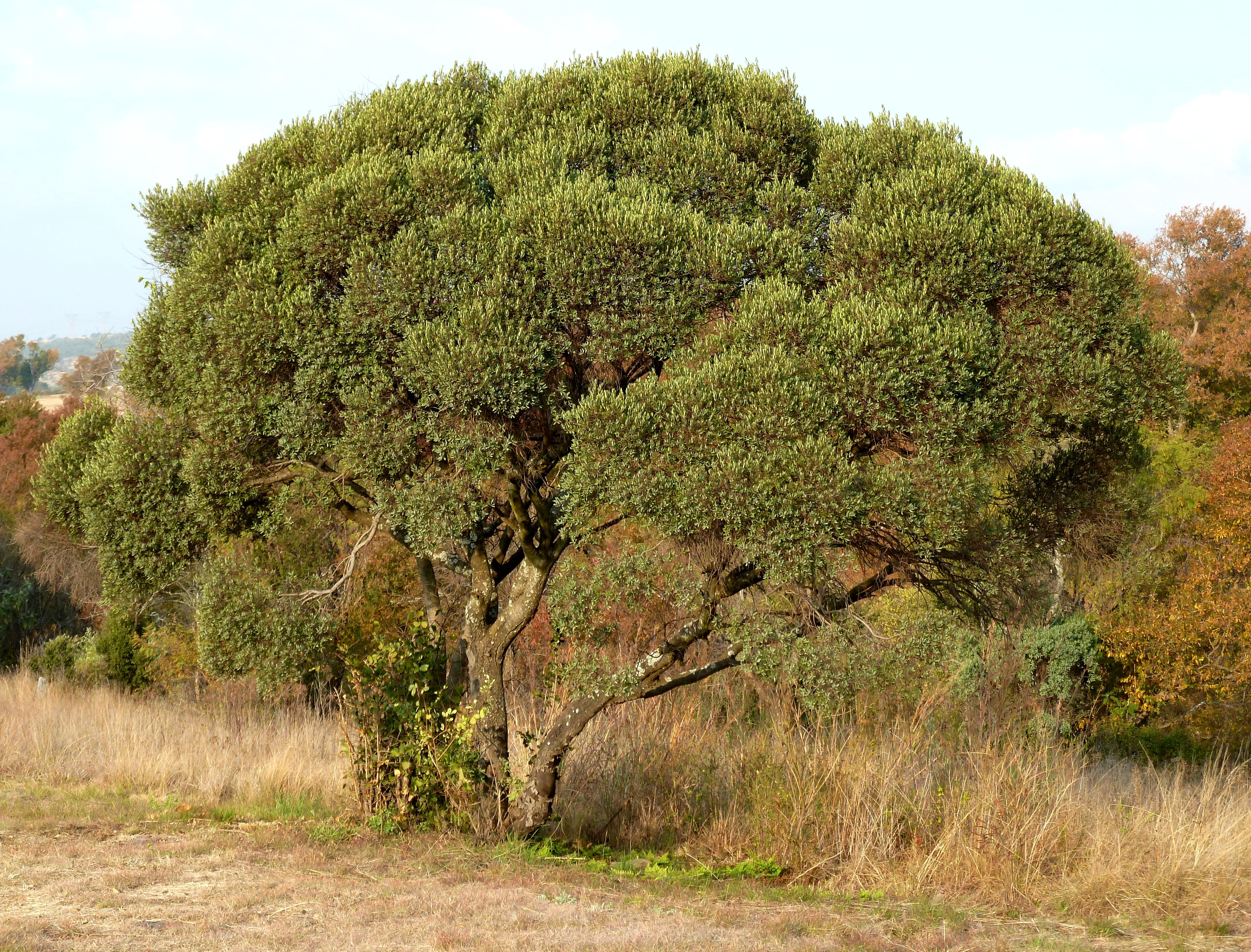
A female tree
