= Graphiocephala strigifera =

Scientific classification
- Kingdom: Animalia
- Phylum: Arthropoda
- Class: Insecta
- Order: Lepidoptera
- Family: Gracillariidae
- Genus: Graphiocephala
- Species: G. strigifera

Binomial name
- Graphiocephala strigifera Vári, 1961

Species of moth

Graphiocephala strigifera is a moth of the family Gracillariidae. It is known from South Africa.
