= Graphiocephala barbitias =

Scientific classification
- Kingdom: Animalia
- Phylum: Arthropoda
- Class: Insecta
- Order: Lepidoptera
- Family: Gracillariidae
- Genus: Graphiocephala
- Species: G. barbitias

Binomial name
- Graphiocephala barbitias (Meyrick, 1909)

Synonyms
- Epicephala barbitias Meyrick, 1909

Species of moth

Graphiocephala barbitias is a moth of the family Gracillariidae. It is known from South Africa and Namibia.

The larvae feed on Euclea lanceolata. They probably mine the leaves of their host plant.
