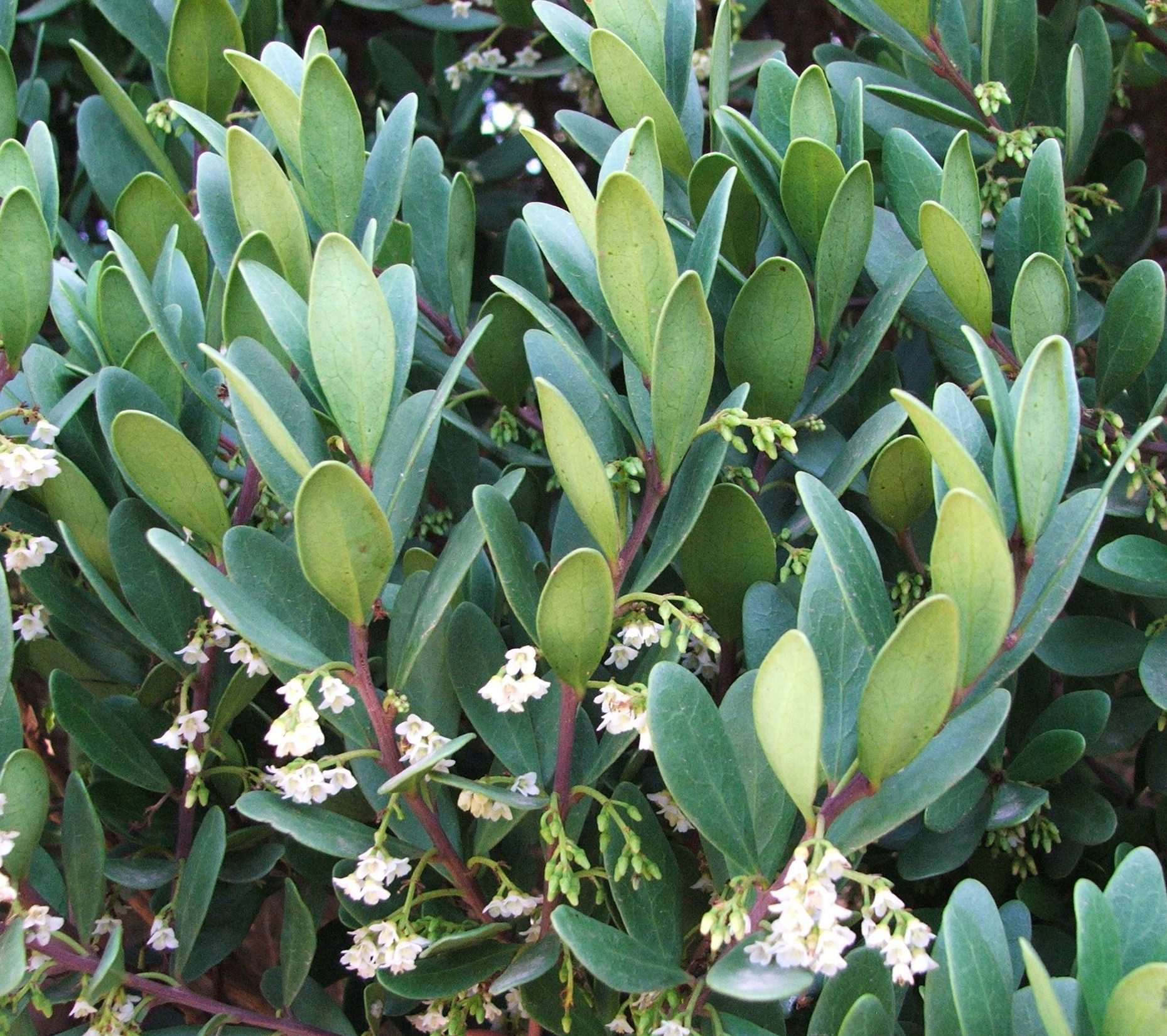
- Euclea racemosa, the sea guarri

Scientific classification
- Kingdom: Plantae
- Clade: Tracheophytes
- Clade: Angiosperms
- Clade: Eudicots
- Clade: Asterids
- Order: Ericales
- Family: Ebenaceae
- Genus: Euclea; L.

Synonyms
- Diplonema G.Don; Rymia Endl.; Kellaua A.DC.

= Euclea =

Genus of flowering plants

Euclea, from the Greek eukleia meaning "glory and fame", denotes a group of flowering plants in the Ebenaceae or ebony family. They were described as a genus by Linnaeus in 1774. The genus includes evergreen trees and shrubs, native to Africa, the Comoro Islands and Arabia. Several species are used for timber, producing a hard, dark heartwood timber similar to ebony.

== Species ==
There are some 16 to 18 species, including:

- Euclea acutifolia E.Mey. ex A.DC. – Cape Province
- Euclea angolensis Gürke – Angola
- Euclea asperrima E.Holzh. – Namibia
- Euclea balfourii Hiern ex Balf.f.
- Euclea coriacea A.DC. – Lesotho, South Africa
- Euclea crispa (Thunb.) Gürke – southern Africa
- Euclea dewinteri Retief – Limpopo
- Euclea divinorum Hiern – from Ethiopia to KwaZulu-Natal
- Euclea lancea Thunb. – Cape Province
- Euclea laurina Hiern ex Balf.f.
- Euclea natalensis A.DC. – from Somalia to KwaZulu-Natal
- Euclea neghellensis Cufod. – Ethiopia
- Euclea polyandra (L.f.) E.Mey. ex Hiern – Cape Province
- Euclea pseudebenus E.Mey. ex A.DC. – Angola, Namibia, Cape Province
- Euclea racemosa L. – from Egypt to Cape Province; Comoros, Oman, Yemen
- Euclea sekhukhuniensis Retief, S.J.Siebert & A.E.van Wyk – Mpumalanga
- Euclea tomentosa E.Mey. ex A.DC. – Cape Province
- Euclea undulata Thunb. – from Zimbabwe to KwaZulu-Natal
