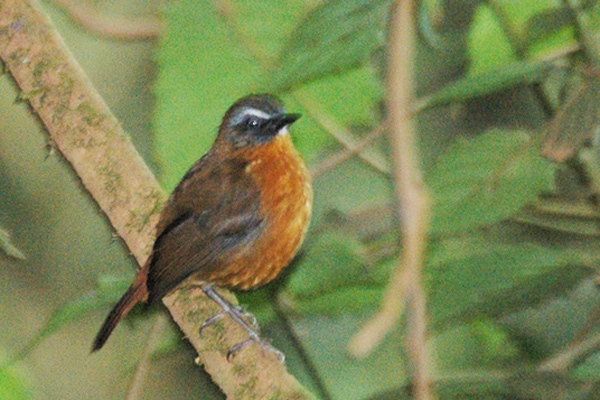

Conservation status
- Least Concern (IUCN 3.1)

Scientific classification
- Kingdom: Animalia
- Phylum: Chordata
- Class: Aves
- Order: Passeriformes
- Family: Muscicapidae
- Genus: Dessonornis
- Species: D. archeri

Binomial name
- Dessonornis archeri (Sharpe, 1902)

Synonyms
- Cossypha archeri

= Archer's ground robin =

Species of bird

Archer's ground robin or Archer's robin-chat, (Dessonornis archeri) is a species of bird in the family Muscicapidae. It is found in the Albertine Rift montane forests.

The bird's common name commemorates the British explorer and colonial official Sir Geoffrey Francis Archer.
