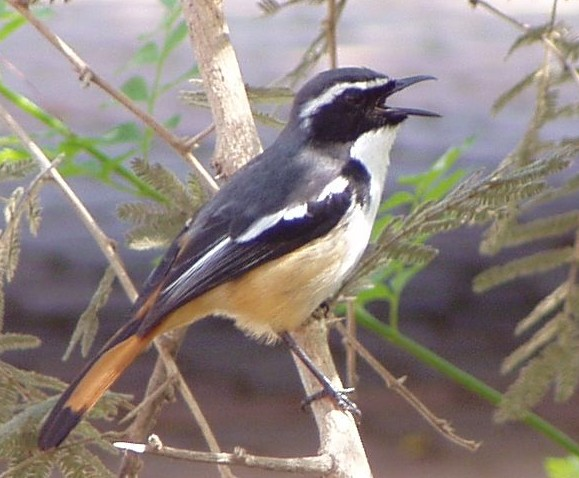
- white-throated robin-chat (Dessonornis humeralis)

Scientific classification
- Domain: Eukaryota
- Kingdom: Animalia
- Phylum: Chordata
- Class: Aves
- Order: Passeriformes
- Family: Muscicapidae
- Genus: Dessonornis; Smith, 1836

Type species
- Dessonornis humeralis

= Dessonornis =

Genus of birds

Dessonornis is a genus of birds in the Old World flycatcher family Muscicapidae that are found in Sub-Saharan Africa.

== Taxonomy ==
The genus Dessonornis was introduced in 1836 by British ornithologist Andrew Smith to accommodate a single species, the white-throated robin-chat, which is therefore considered as the type species. The name Dessonornis is a misspelling, Smith corrected it to Bessonornis in 1840. The name combines the Ancient Greek bēssa meaning "glen" or "wooded valley" with ornis meaning "bird". The spelling correction is not recognized by International Ornithologists' Union.

Species in this genus was previously placed in Cossypha, while phylogenetic studies revealed that they are more closely related to Cichladusa and Xenocopsychus. In the taxonomic revision to create monophyletic groups, Dessonornis was resurrected with the following species:

- White-throated robin-chat, Dessonornis humeralis
- Cape robin-chat, Dessonornis caffer
- Archer's ground robin, Dessonornis archeri
- Olive-flanked ground robin, Dessonornis anomalus
