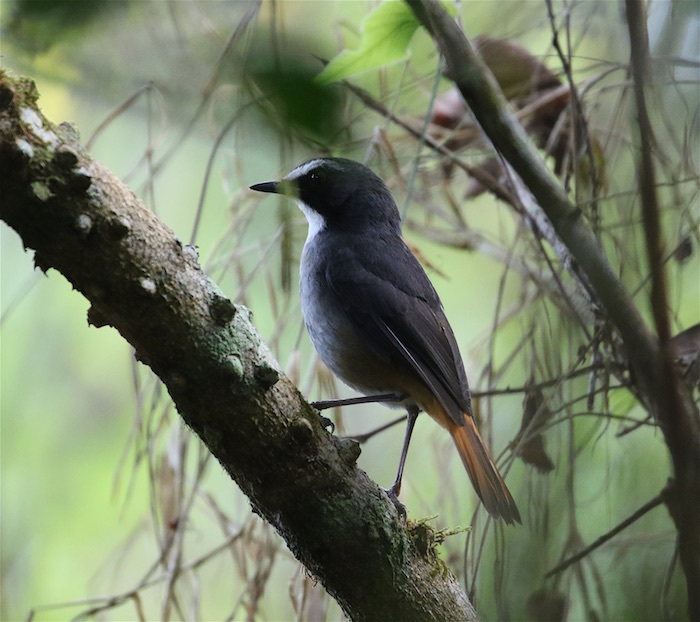
- ssp. grotei

Conservation status
- Near Threatened (IUCN 3.1)

Scientific classification
- Kingdom: Animalia
- Phylum: Chordata
- Class: Aves
- Order: Passeriformes
- Family: Muscicapidae
- Genus: Dessonornis
- Species: D. anomalus

Binomial name
- Dessonornis anomalus (Shelley, 1893)

Synonyms
- Cossypha anomala

= Olive-flanked ground robin =

Species of bird

The olive-flanked ground robin (Dessonornis anomalus), also known as the olive-flanked robin-chat, is a species of bird in the family Muscicapidae. It is found in Malawi, and Mozambique. Its natural habitat is tropical moist montane forests.
