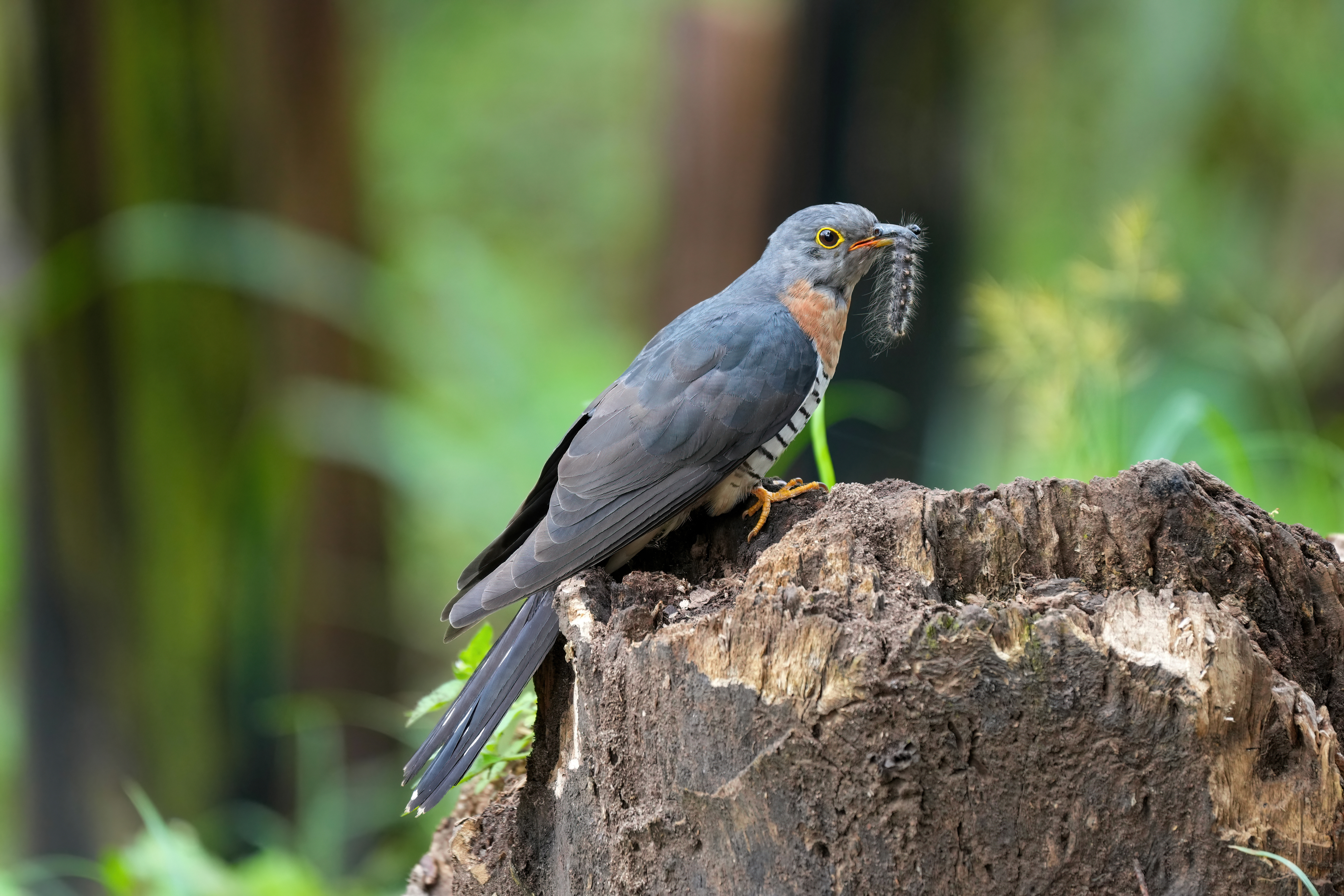
- Red-chested cuckoo at Kibale Forest National Park, Uganda

Conservation status
- Least Concern (IUCN 3.1)

Scientific classification
- Kingdom: Animalia
- Phylum: Chordata
- Class: Aves
- Order: Cuculiformes
- Family: Cuculidae
- Genus: Cuculus
- Species: C. solitarius

Binomial name
- Cuculus solitarius Stephens, 1815

Audio
- Calls recorded in Kitale, Kenya

= Red-chested cuckoo =

Species of bird

The red-chested cuckoo (Cuculus solitarius) is a species of cuckoo in the family Cuculidae. It is a medium-sized bird found in Africa, south of the Sahara. In Afrikaans, it is known as "Piet-my-vrou", after its call.

== Description ==
The red-chested cuckoo is a medium-size cuckoo about 31 cm (12.2 in) in length. The male has slate-grey upper parts, pale grey throat and sides of head and dark grey tail tipped with white. The breast is rufous or cinnamon, often with barring, and the belly is creamy-white or pale buff. The female is similar but the colour of the breast is duller and with variable amounts of barring.

== Distribution and habitat ==
It is found in Angola, Benin, Botswana, Burundi, Cameroon, Central African Republic, Chad, Republic of the Congo, Democratic Republic of the Congo, Ivory Coast, Equatorial Guinea, Eswatini, Ethiopia, Gabon, Gambia, Ghana, Guinea, Guinea-Bissau, Kenya, Lesotho, Liberia, Malawi, Mali, Mozambique, Namibia, Nigeria, Rwanda, Senegal, Sierra Leone, Somalia, South Africa, Sudan, Tanzania, Togo, Uganda, Zambia, and Zimbabwe. In Southern Africa it is a common breeding migrant, found throughout the area except for the drier west. The preferred habitats for the red-chested cuckoo are woodlands. The red-chested cuckoo is normally seen by itself rather than in the company of birds of the same species.

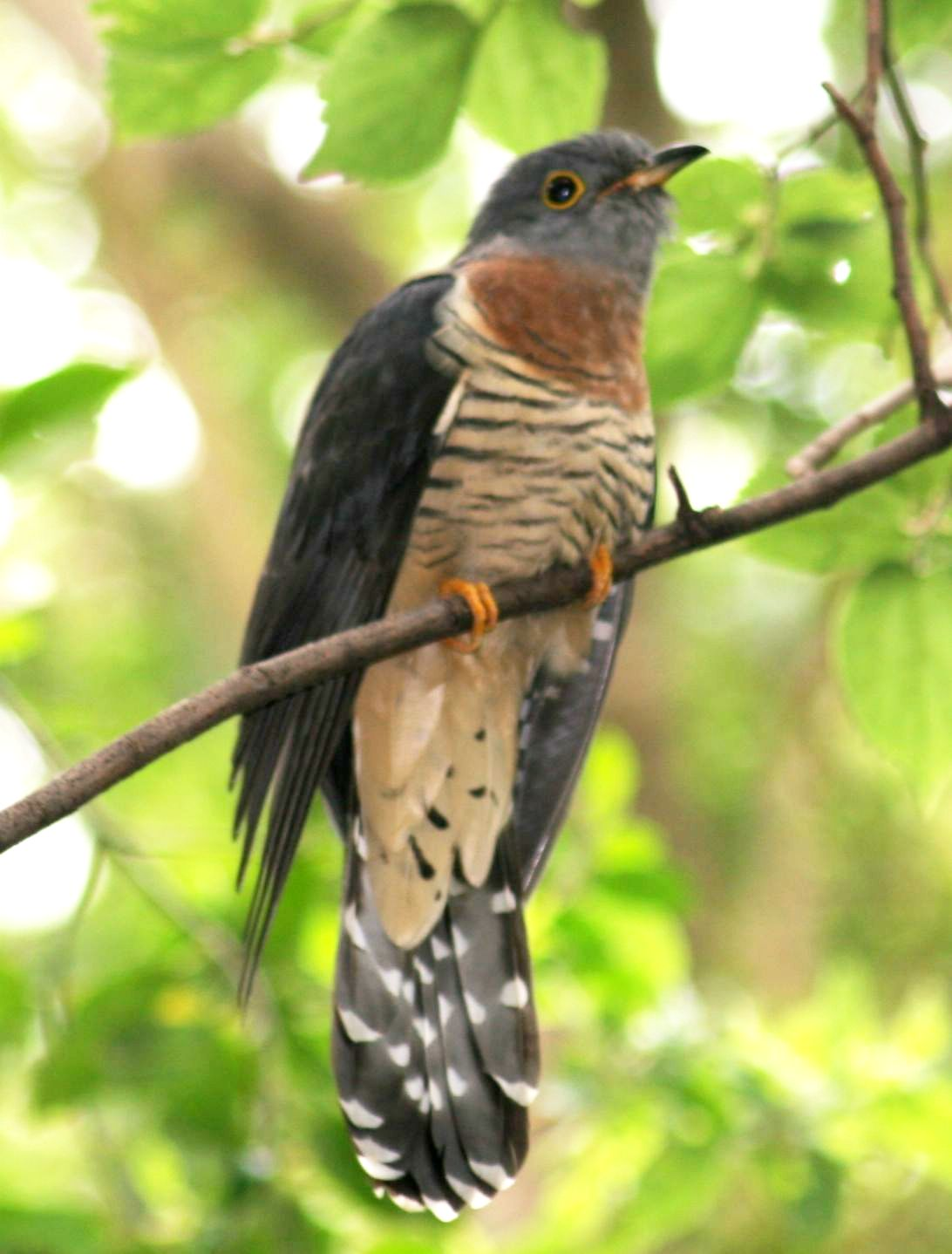
Male at Walter Sisulu Botanical Garden, South Africa

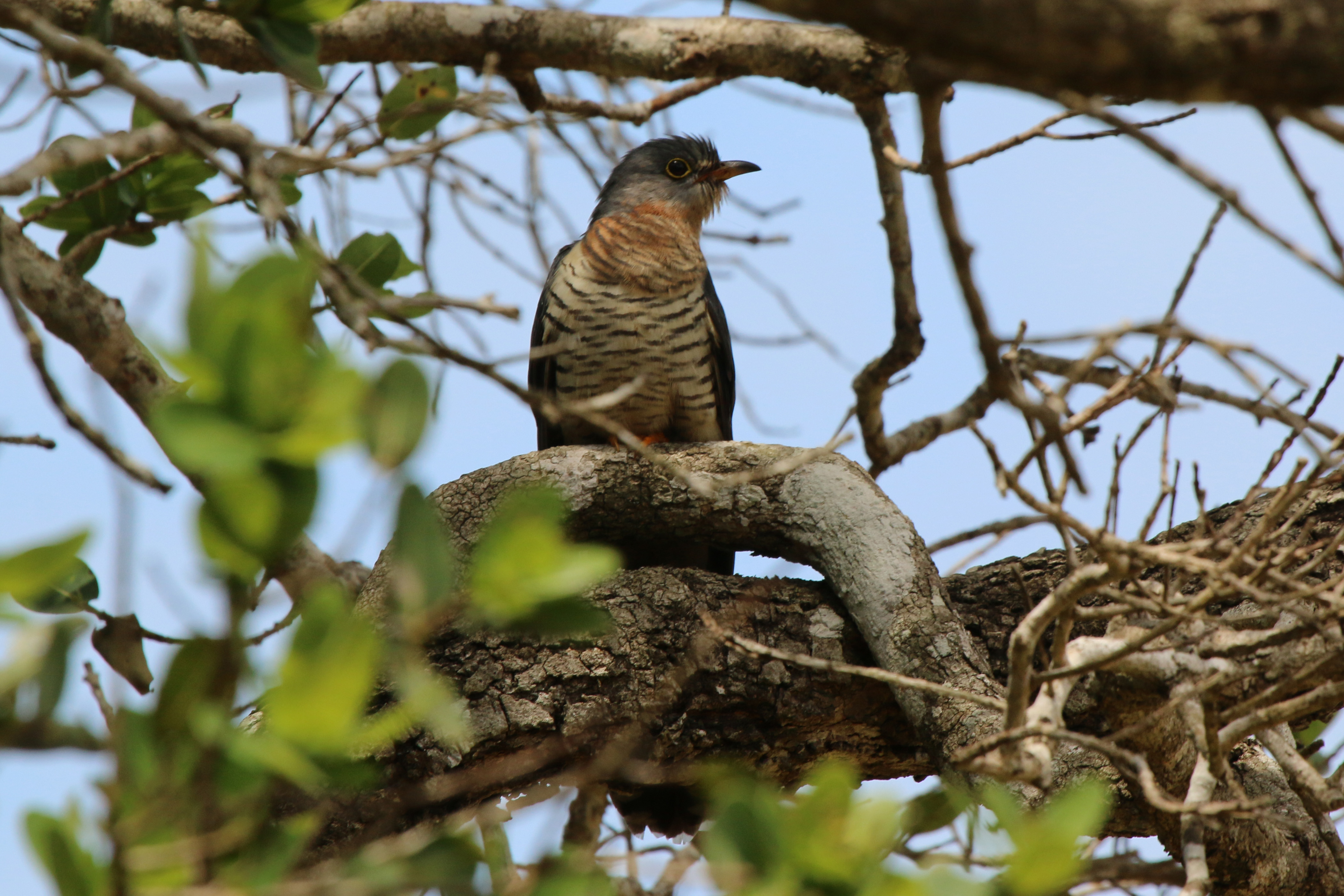
A female in KwaZulu-Natal, South Africa

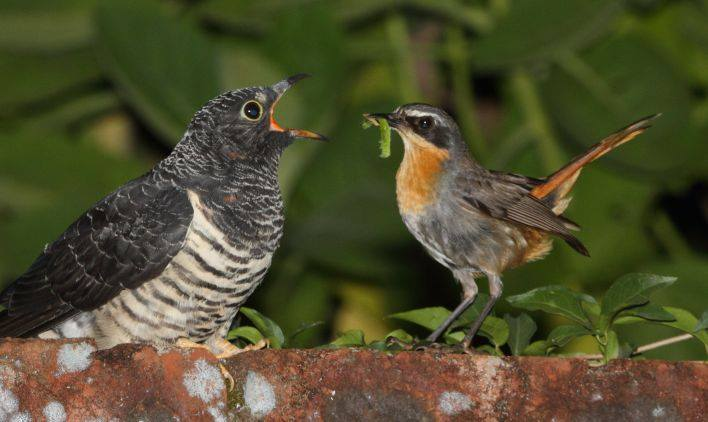
A juvenile bird being fed by a Cape robin-chat host

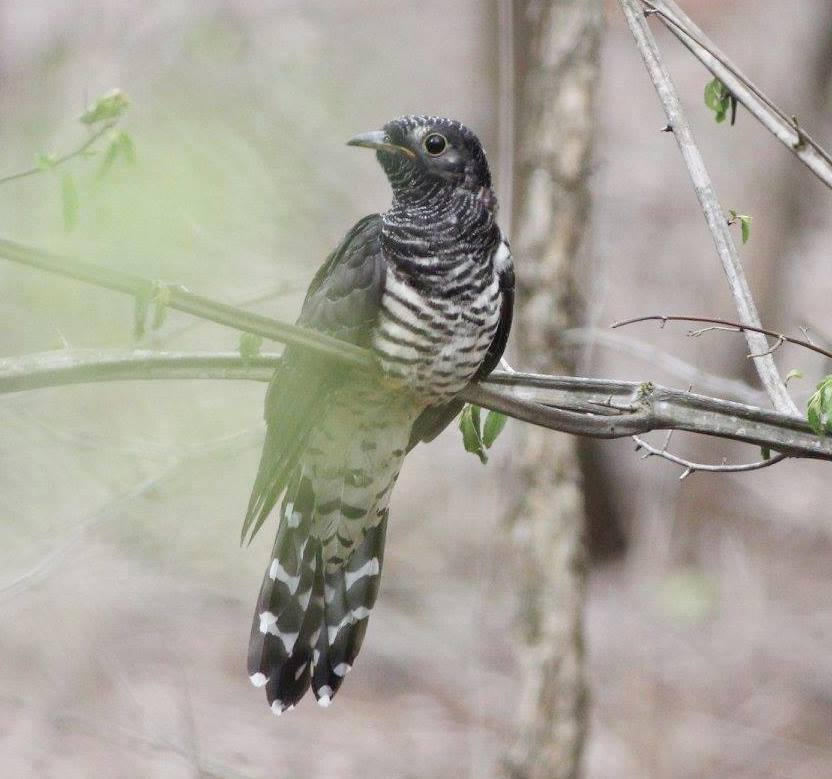
An immature bird in fresh plumage, South Africa

== Behavior ==
It is usually solitary and highly vocal and lives on forests and plantations. It eats insects including hairy caterpillars, spiders, centipedes, millipedes, slugs, snails, small vertebrates and berries.

The red-chested cuckoo is polygamous. Like other cuckoos, the red-chested cuckoo lays its eggs in other birds' nests, leaving the parasitized birds to care for the cuckoo chicks, which they do, believing it is their own offspring (brood parasitism). About fifteen different species of small bird are victimized, but the most common hosts are the Cape robin-chat (Cossypha caffra), the Cape wagtail (Motacilla capensis) and the white-throated robin-chat (Cossypha humeralis). The surrogate family then raise the chick. The bird lays eggs which are brown in colour and number between 20 eggs per season in different nests.
