= Graphiocephala =

Scientific classification
- Kingdom: Animalia
- Phylum: Arthropoda
- Class: Insecta
- Order: Lepidoptera
- Family: Gracillariidae
- Subfamily: Gracillariinae
- Genus: Graphiocephala; Vári, 1961

Species
- See text

Genus of moths

Graphiocephala is a genus of moths in the family Gracillariidae.

== Species ==
- Graphiocephala barbitias (Meyrick, 1909)
- Graphiocephala polysticha Vári, 1961
- Graphiocephala strigifera Vári, 1961
