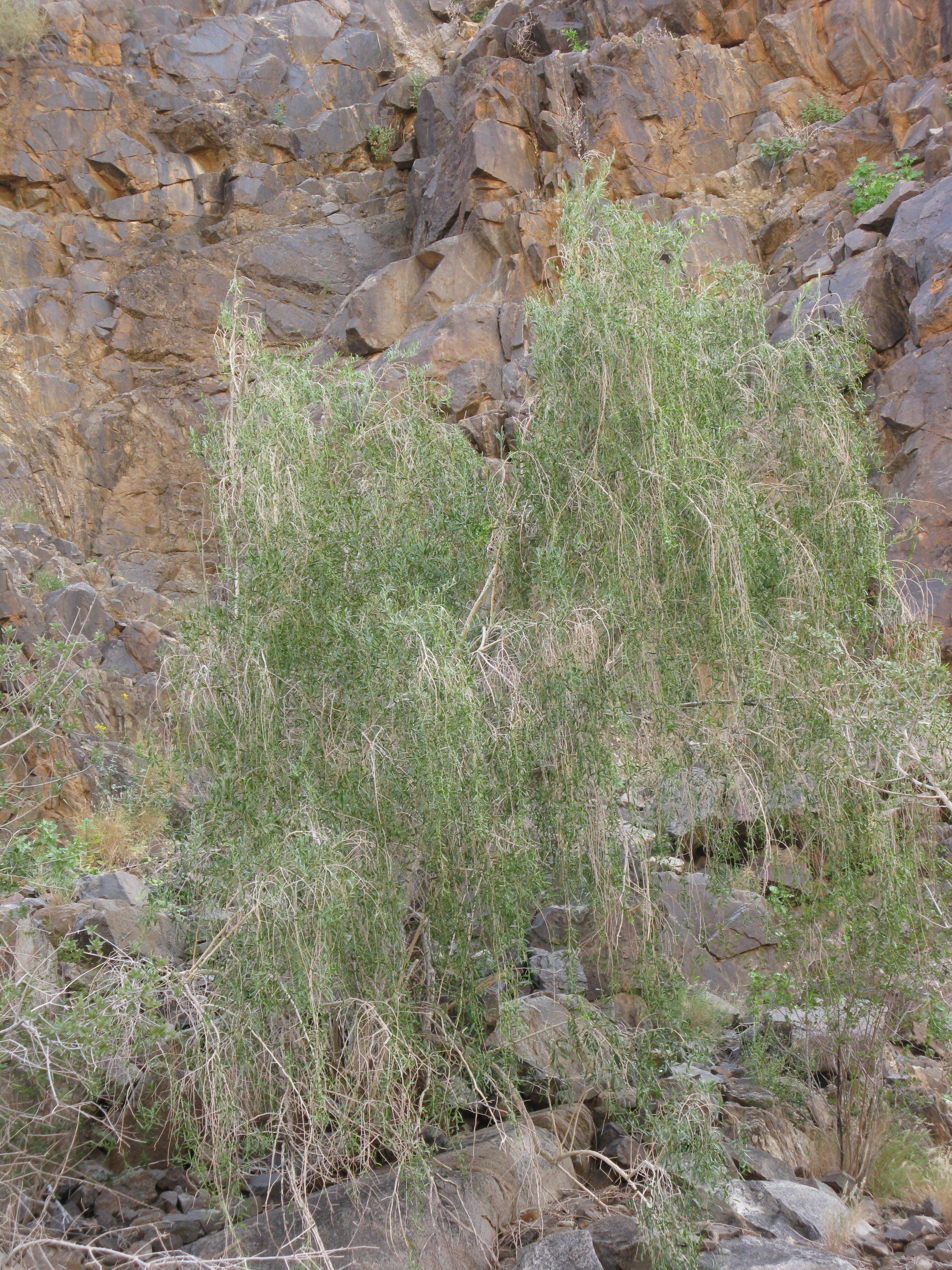
- Willowy habit on a scree slope of the Fish River Canyon in southern Namibia

Conservation status
- Least Concern (IUCN 3.1)

Scientific classification
- Kingdom: Plantae
- Clade: Tracheophytes
- Clade: Angiosperms
- Clade: Eudicots
- Clade: Asterids
- Order: Ericales
- Family: Ebenaceae
- Genus: Euclea
- Species: E. pseudebenus

Binomial name
- Euclea pseudebenus E.Mey. ex A.DC.

Synonyms
- Diospyros pseudebenum (E.Mey. ex A.DC.) P.Parm.; Euclea angustifolia Benth.

= Euclea pseudebenus =

Ebony guarri

Species of tree

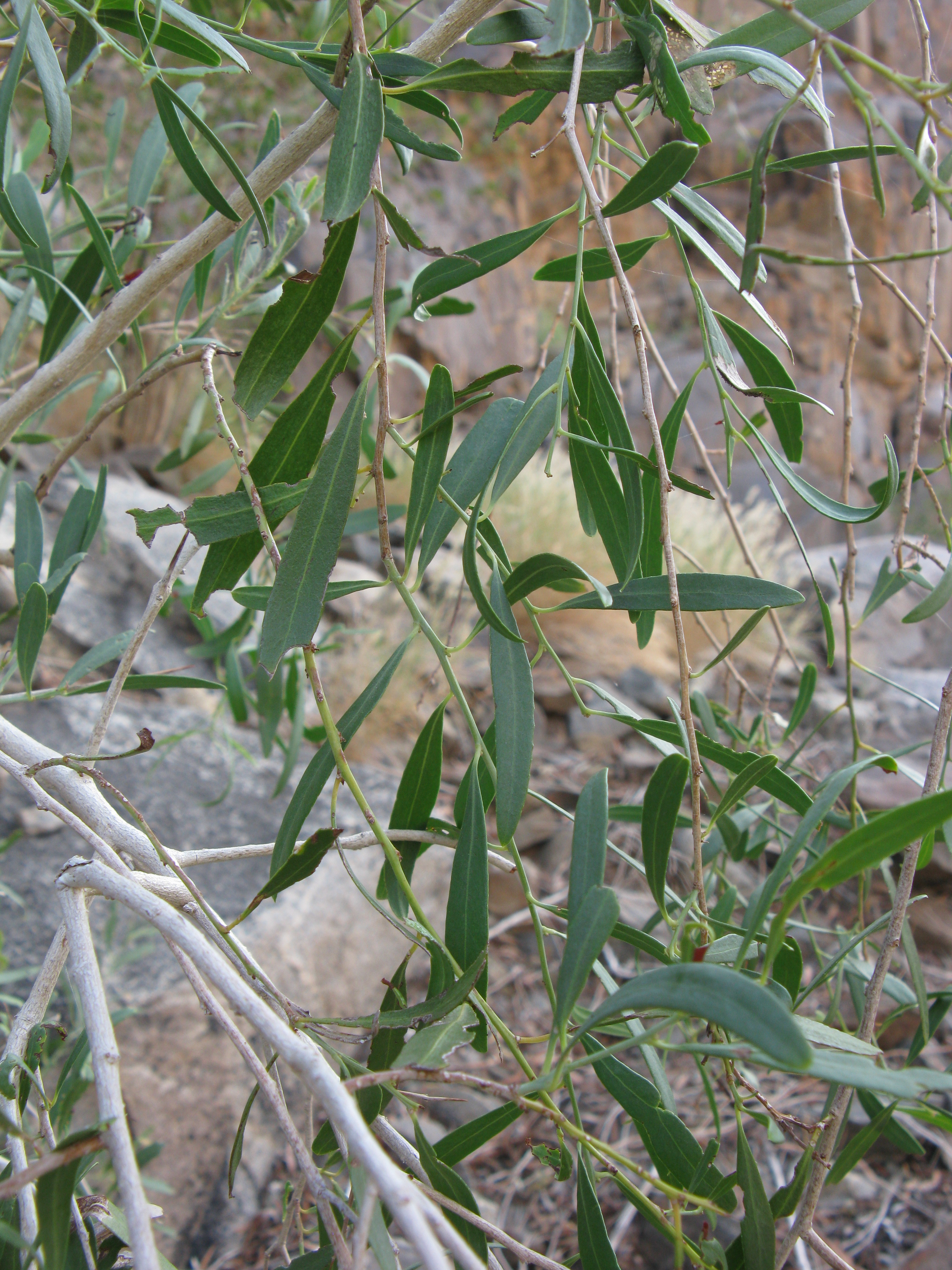
Sprays with foliage

Euclea pseudebenus (Cape ebony, Ebony guarri, Afrikaans: Ebbehout-ghwarrie) is a tree native to Angola, Namibia and the Cape Province region of South Africa. It is classified as a protected tree in South Africa.

== See also ==
- List of Southern African indigenous trees
