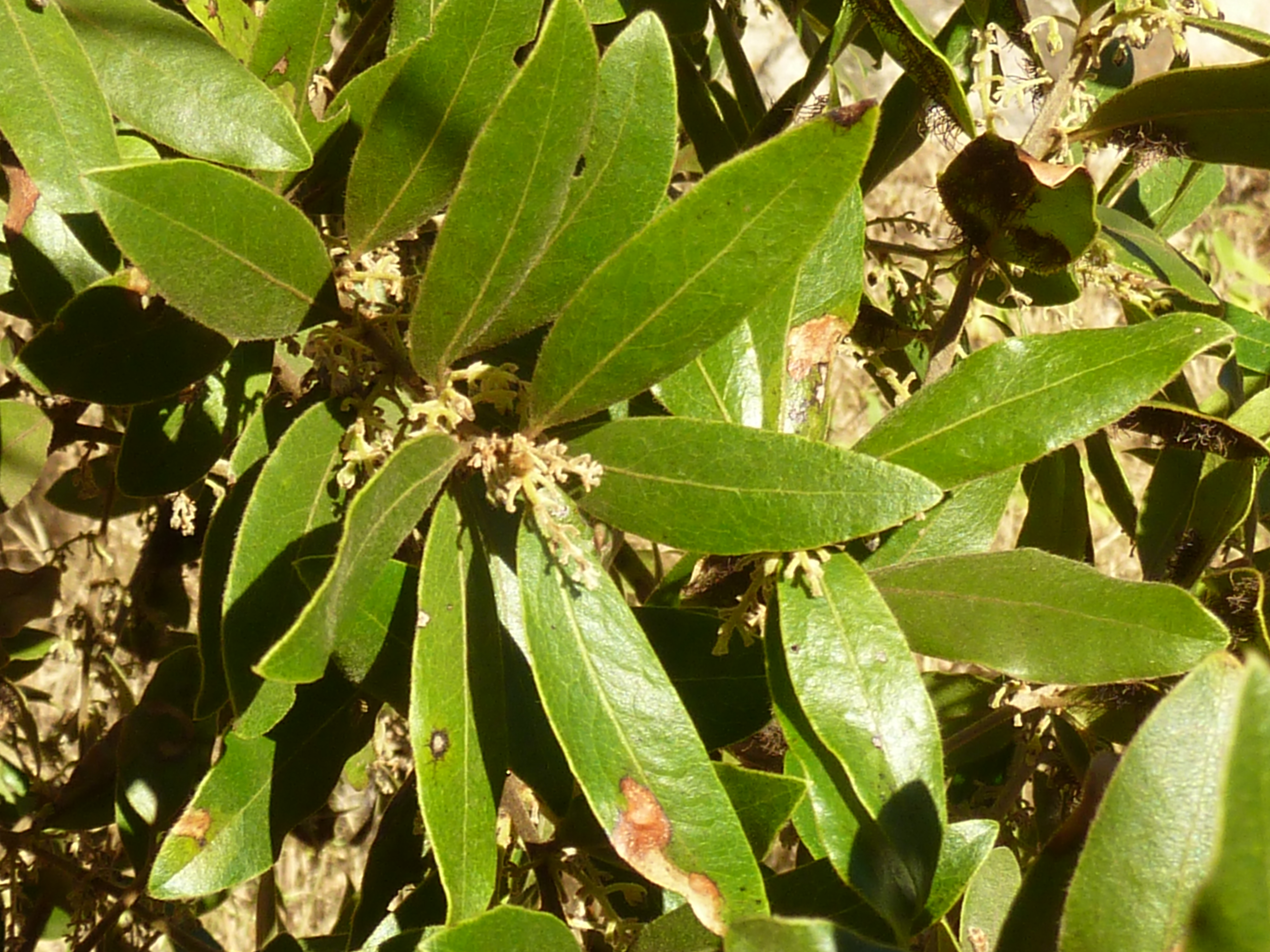

Scientific classification
- Kingdom: Plantae
- Clade: Tracheophytes
- Clade: Angiosperms
- Clade: Eudicots
- Clade: Asterids
- Order: Ericales
- Family: Ebenaceae
- Genus: Euclea
- Species: E. natalensis

Binomial name
- Euclea natalensis A.DC.

Synonyms
- Euclea multiflora Hiern; Royena macrophylla E.Mey. ex A.DC.

= Euclea natalensis =

Natal guarri

Species of tree

Euclea natalensis, the Natal guarri, is a dioecious African plant species of the family Ebenaceae. It occurs from Ethiopia and Somalia in the north, southwards to the Western Cape, South Africa. It has nectar and also contains pollen Its hirsute, leathery leaves have an opposite arrangement, and the flower sprays grow from the leaf axils. The spherical fruit appear from October to June.

== Races ==
The three races are:

- Euclea natalensis subsp. natalensis
- Euclea natalensis subsp. angolensis F.White
- Euclea natalensis subsp. obovata F.White
