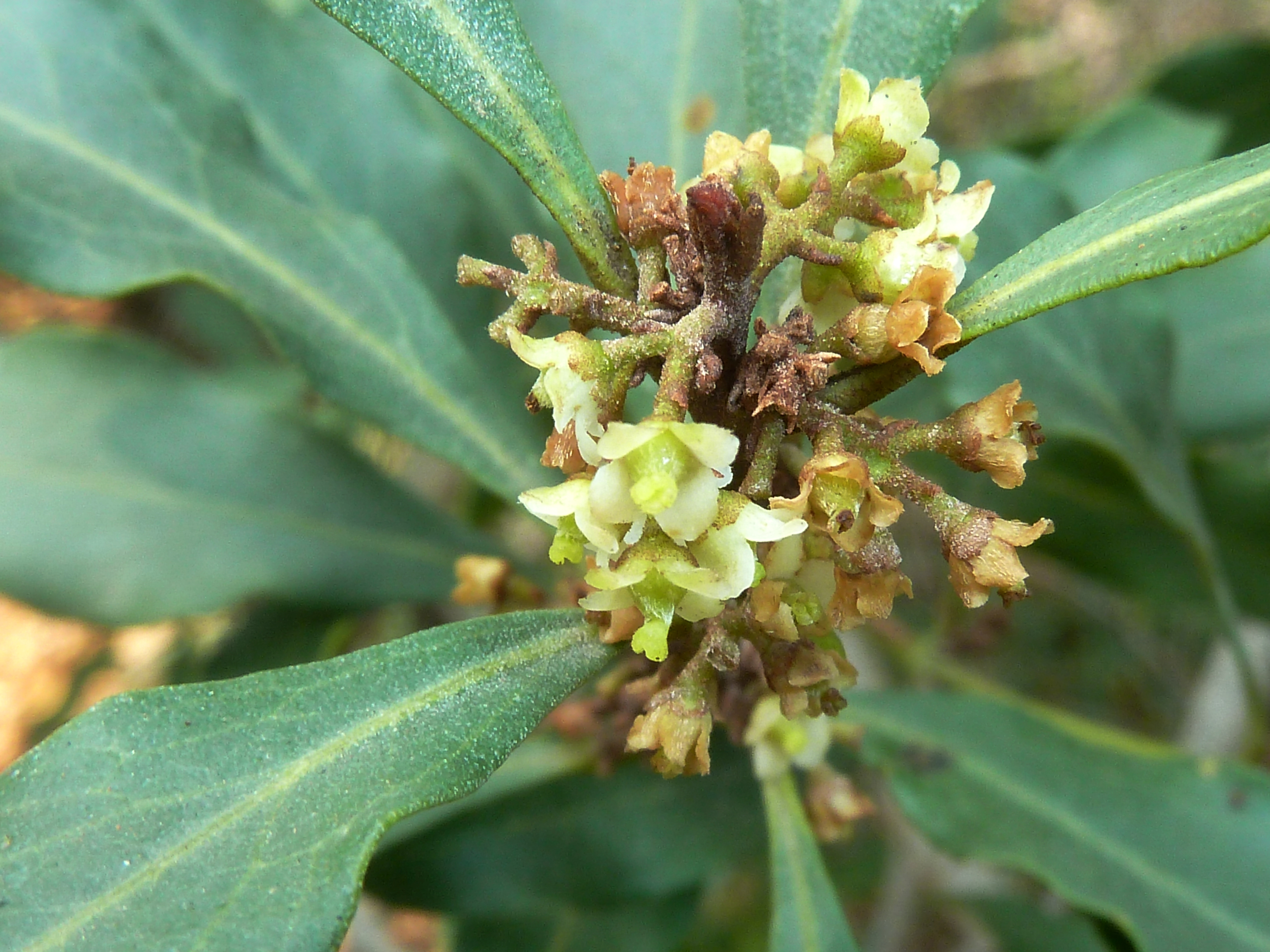
- Flowers

Scientific classification
- Kingdom: Plantae
- Clade: Tracheophytes
- Clade: Angiosperms
- Clade: Eudicots
- Clade: Asterids
- Order: Ericales
- Family: Ebenaceae
- Genus: Euclea
- Species: E. divinorum

Binomial name
- Euclea divinorum Hiern

Synonyms
- List: Euclea balfourii Hiern ex Balf.f.; Euclea huillensis Gürke; Euclea katangensis De Wild.; Euclea keniensis R.E.Fr.; Euclea kiwuensis Gürke; Euclea laurina Hiern ex Balf.f.; Euclea stuhlmannii Gürke

= Euclea divinorum =

Magic guarri

Species of plant in the genus Euclea

Euclea divinorum, called diamond leaf, diamond-leaved euclea, magic guarri, and toothbrush tree, is a species of flowering plant in the genus Euclea, native to eastern and southern Africa. A shrub or small tree, it has many uses in Africa, including as a source for dye for wool, for tanning leather, and an ink, and as a preservative for milk (allowing it to keep for up to a year), and, by chewing on a twig, as a toothbrush.

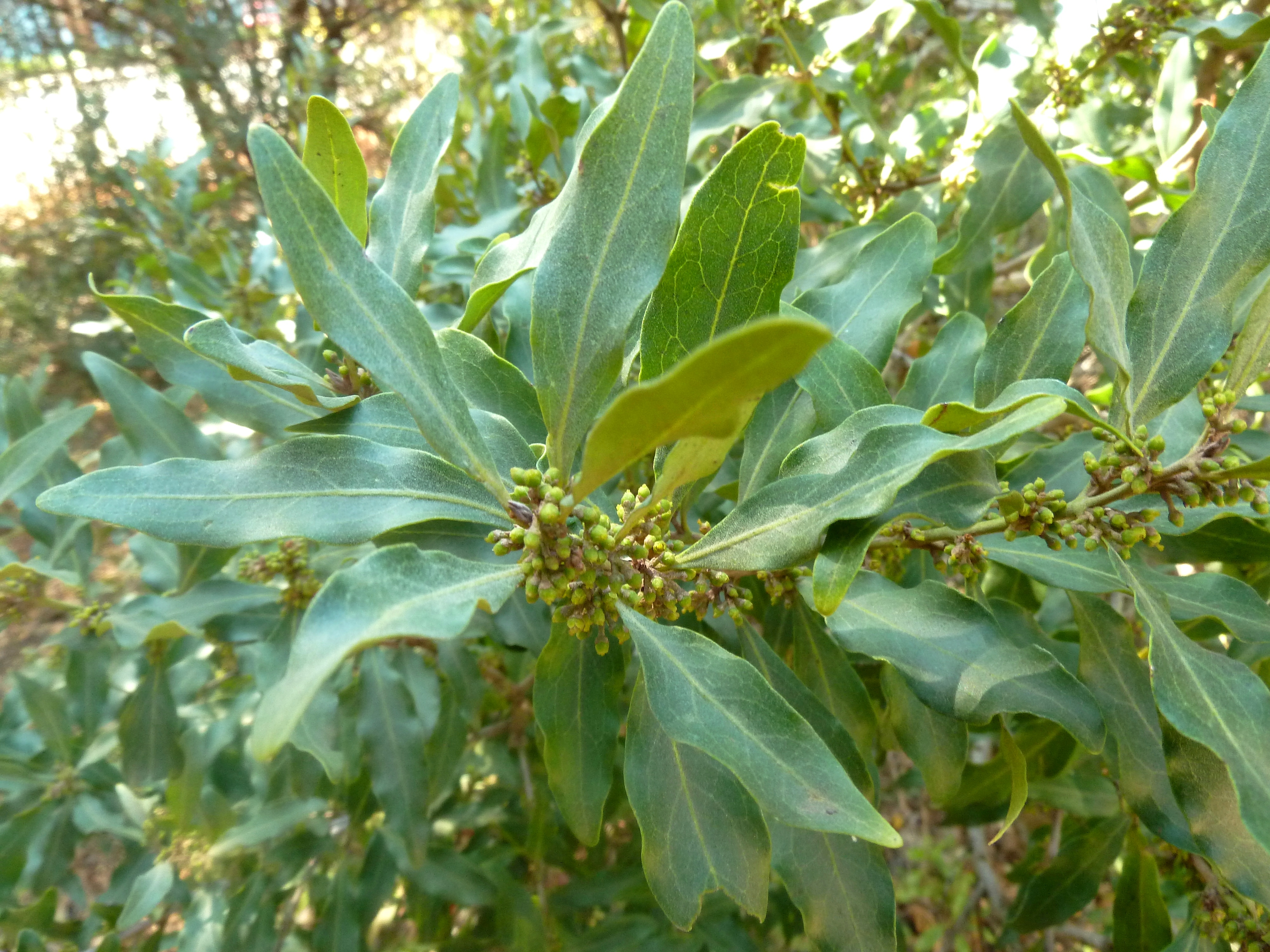
Foliage and flower buds of a magic guarri in the Manie van der Schijff Botanical Garden in Pretoria, South Africa
