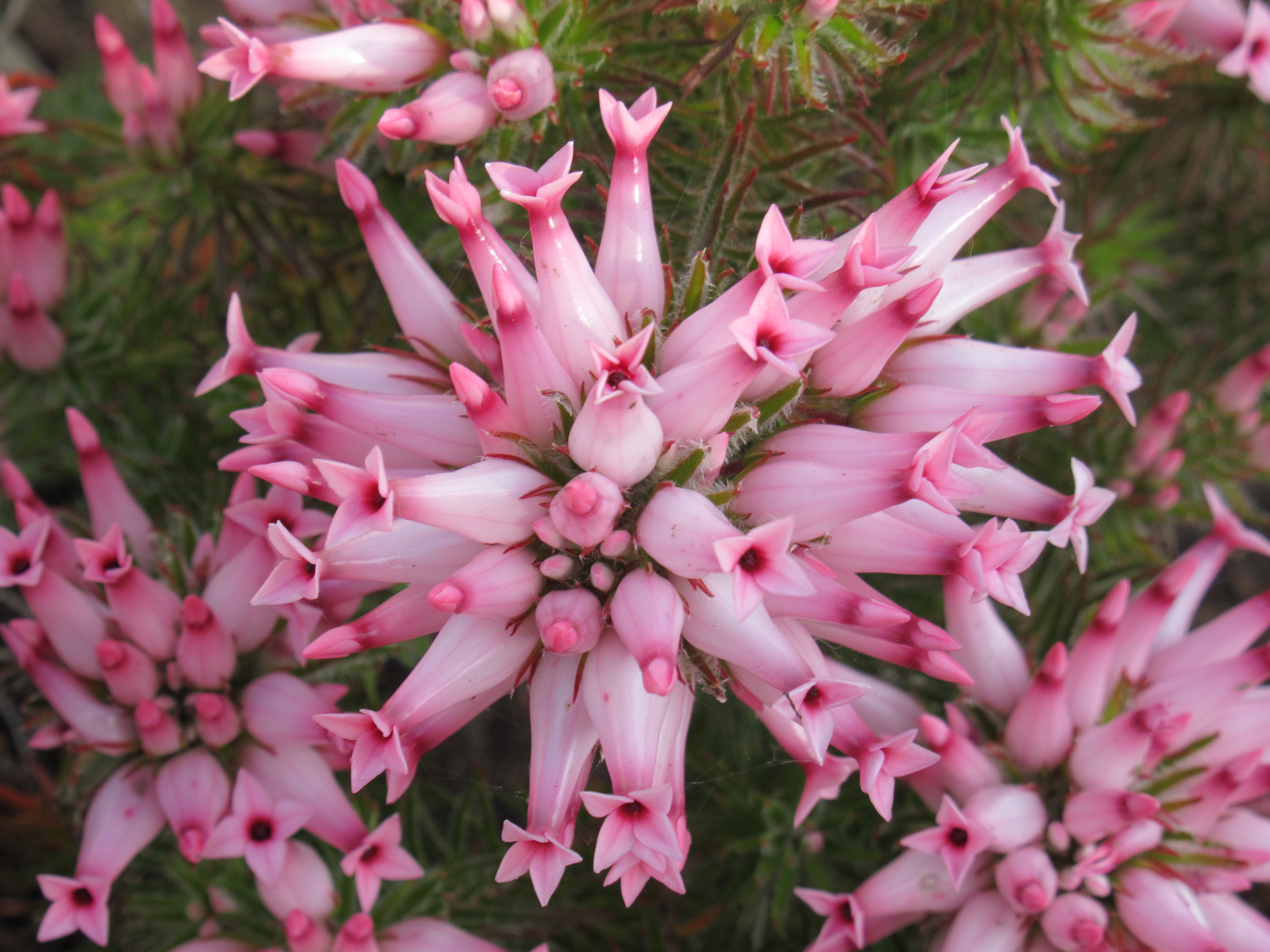

Scientific classification
- Kingdom: Plantae
- Clade: Tracheophytes
- Clade: Angiosperms
- Clade: Eudicots
- Clade: Asterids
- Order: Ericales
- Family: Ericaceae
- Genus: Erica
- Species: E. ventricosa

Binomial name
- Erica ventricosa Thunb.

Synonyms
- Erica densa Andrews; Erica dentata J.C.Wendl.; Erica excelsa Tausch; Erica glabra Link; Erica praegnans Andrews; Erica venusta Salisb.

= Erica ventricosa =

Species of flowering plant

Erica ventricosa is a species of plant in the family Ericaceae native to the Cape Floristic Region.

== Etymology ==
The scientific name of this species is derived from the Latin word ventricosus, which means swollen or inflated. Its common names are Franschhoek heath, porcelain heath, and wax heath.

== Distribution ==
It naturally occurs on mountain slopes in the Paarl and Stellenbosch area of the Hottentots-Holland range, when the elevation is higher than 300 m above sea level.

== Habitat ==
Population groups of these plants are normally found in well-drained acid soils with a pH between 5.5 and 6.5.

== Ecology ==
The corolla in Erica ventricosa has an ovoid-urceolate form and is 12 mm to 16 mm in length, with a constriction at the throat. This form is no accident, as there are specialist flies with a long proboscis that are adapted to pollinate it.
