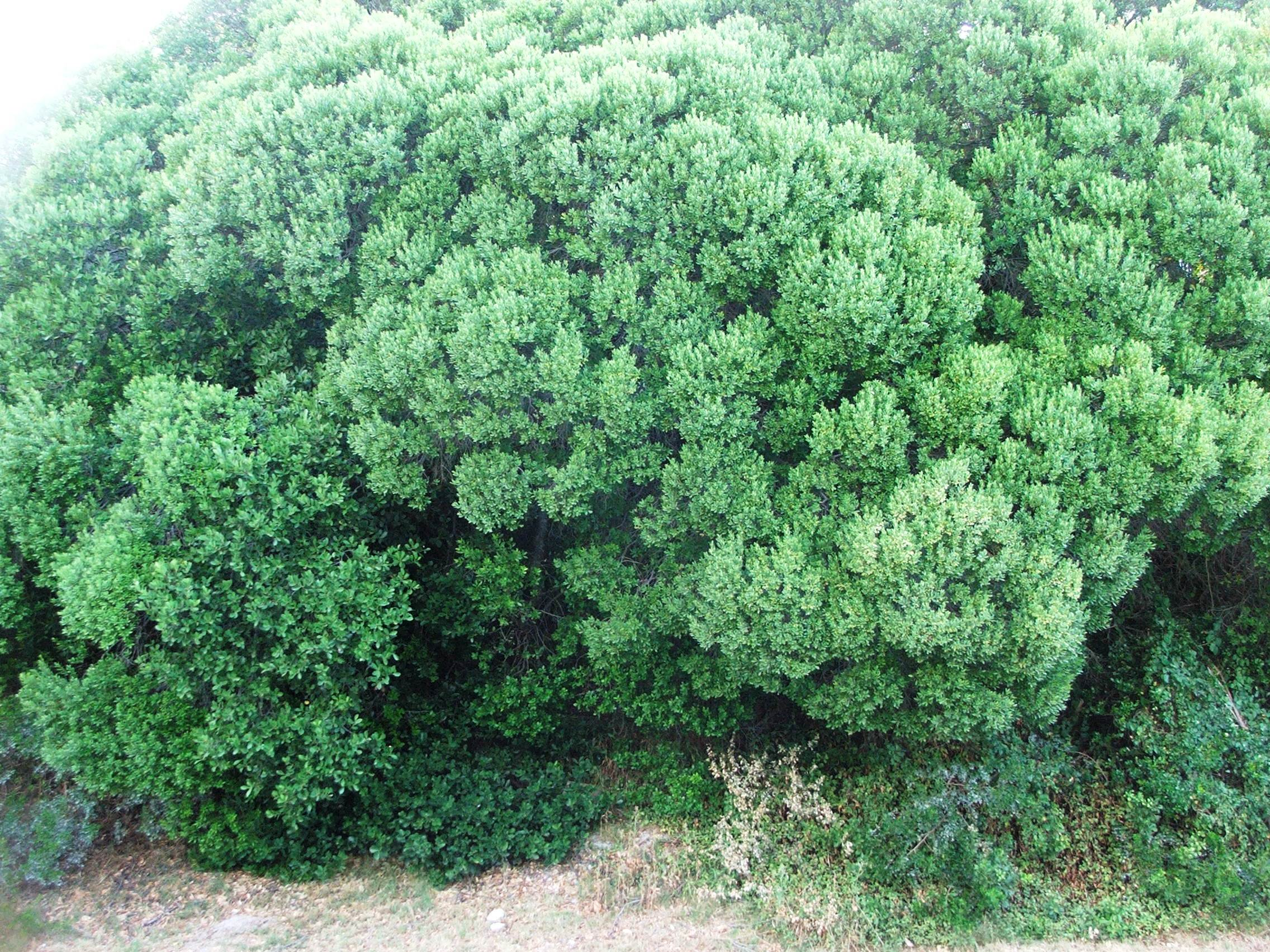

Scientific classification
- Kingdom: Plantae
- Clade: Tracheophytes
- Clade: Angiosperms
- Clade: Eudicots
- Clade: Asterids
- Order: Ericales
- Family: Ebenaceae
- Genus: Euclea
- Species: E. racemosa

Binomial name
- Euclea racemosa L.

= Euclea racemosa =

Species of tree

Euclea racemosa (the sea guarrie or dune guarrie) is a small to medium-sized evergreen tree that is indigenous to the Indian Ocean coast of Africa from Egypt to South Africa, as well as in Comoros, Oman and Yemen.

Euclea racemosa has leathery foliage that can be exceptionally even and dense - making it an ideal plant for hedges. A dioecious tree (male and female flowers on separate trees), it produces small white flowers, which are followed by red, purple and black fruits that attract birds.
The berries are used locally to make "Guarrie vinegar".

The name guarrie appears to derive from the local Khoe language, in which it is spelled gwarri.

== Pictures ==
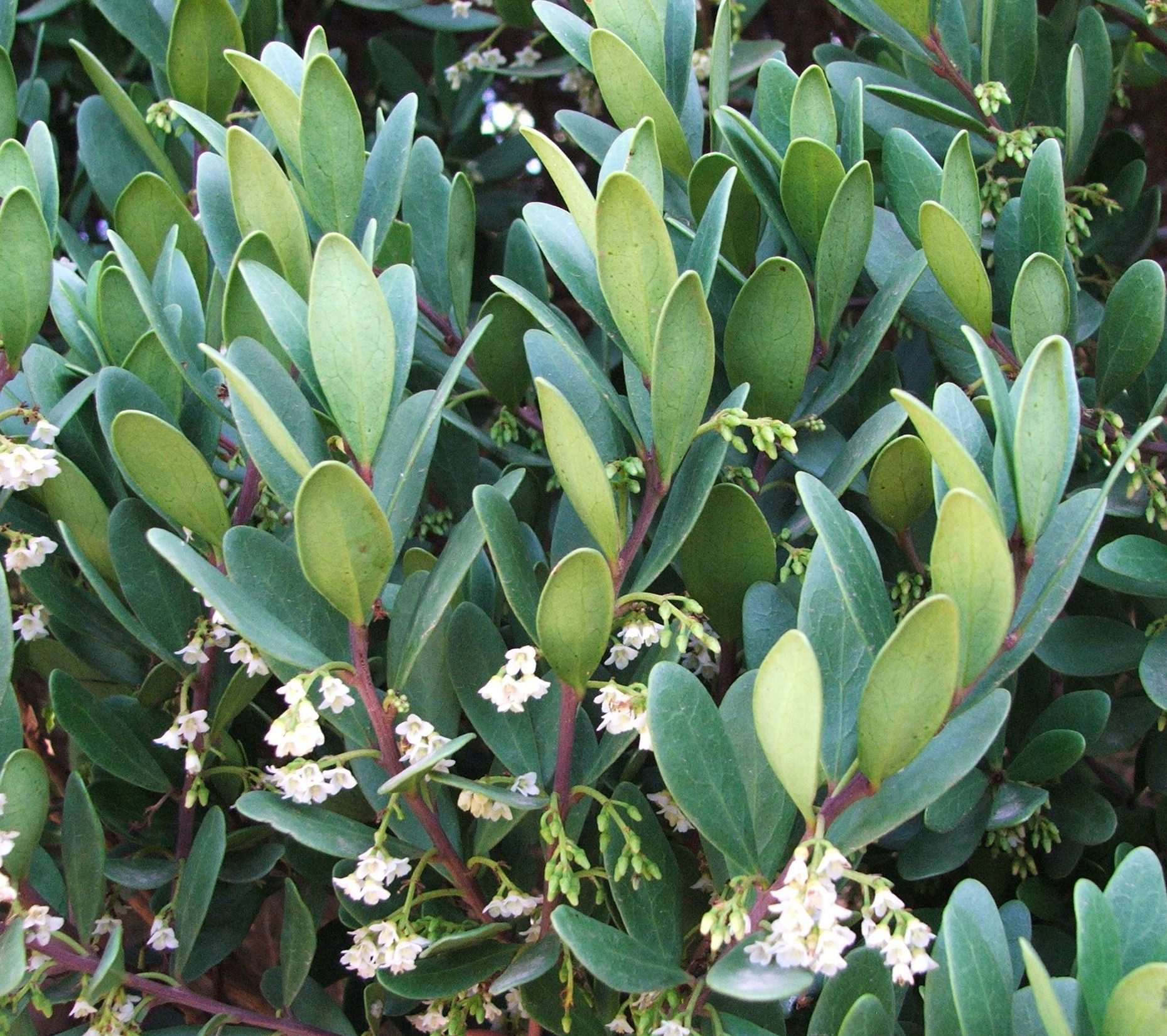
Detail of inflorescence.

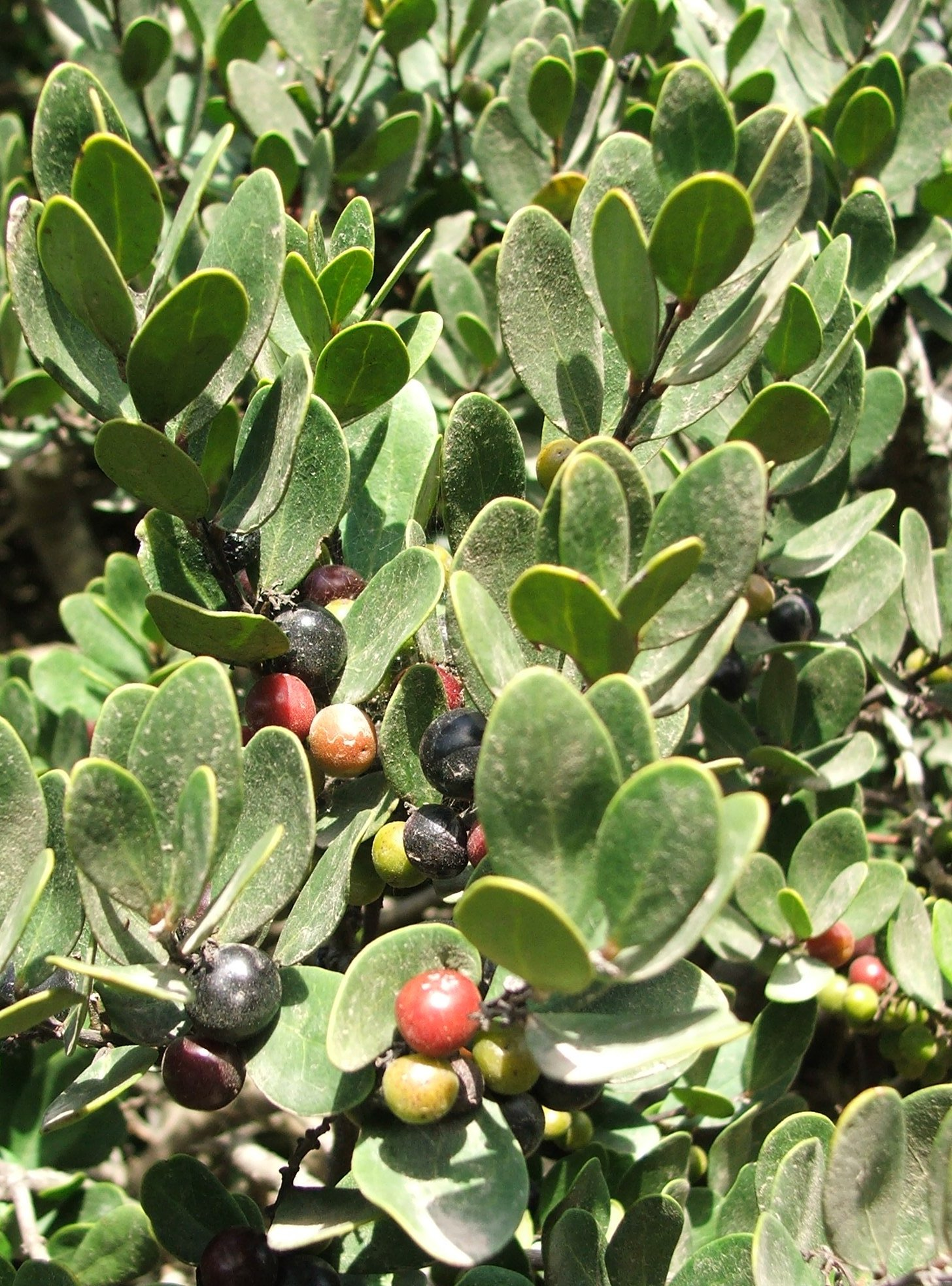
The characteristic multi-coloured berries of the Sea Guarrie tree.

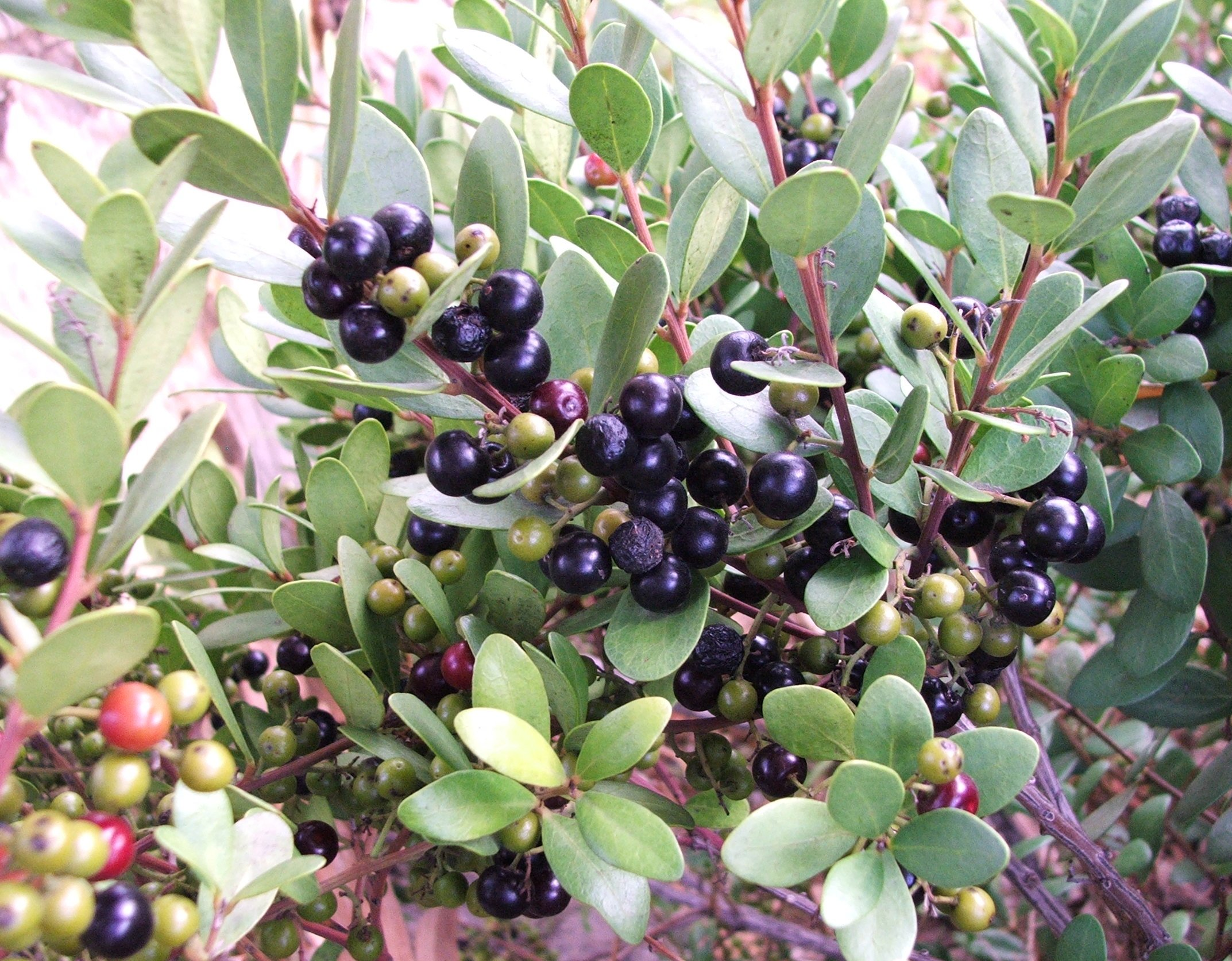
Detail of berries.

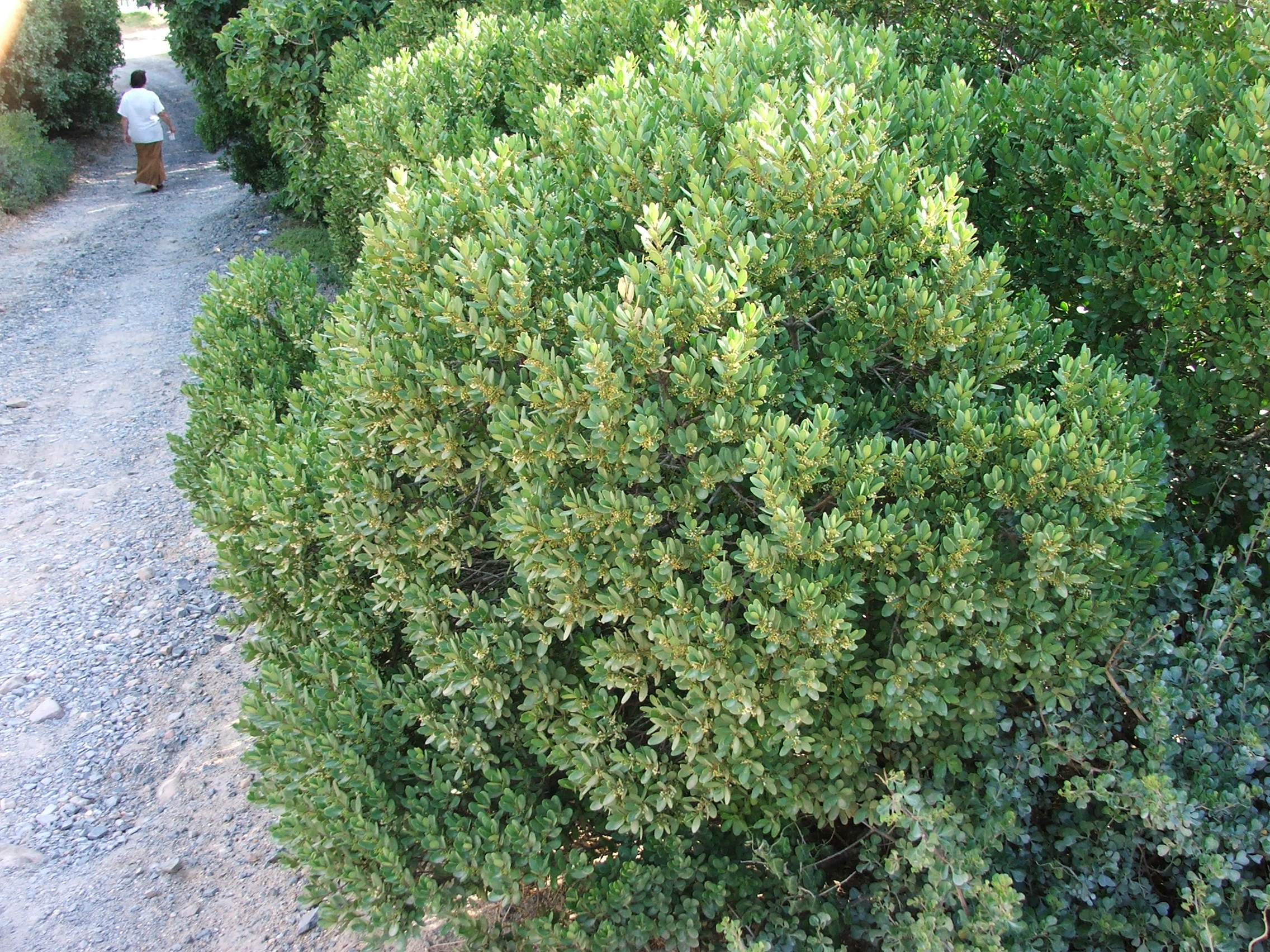
Euclea racemosa used for roadside hedging.

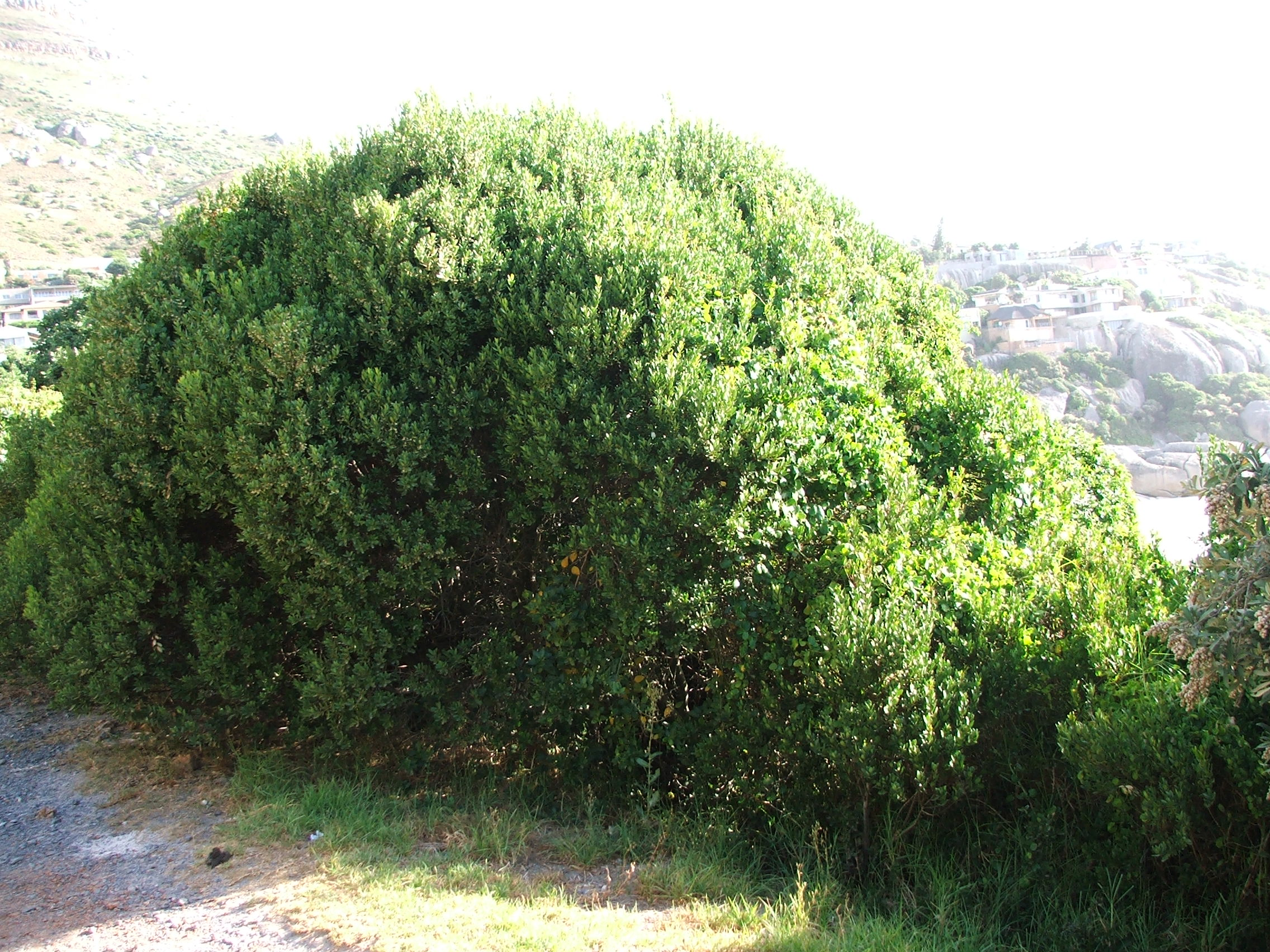
Rough Euclea racemosa hedging. Cape Town.

== Classification ==
subspecies

1. Euclea racemosa subsp. bernardii F.White - Cape Province
2. Euclea racemosa subsp. daphnoides (Hiern) F.White - Cape Province, KwaZulu-Natal, Eswatini, Mpumalanga, Limpopo
3. Euclea racemosa subsp. macrophylla (E.Mey. ex A.DC.) F.White - Cape Province, KwaZulu-Natal
4. Euclea racemosa subsp. racemosa - Cape Province
5. Euclea racemosa subsp. schimperi (A.DC.) F.White - most of species range
6. Euclea racemosa subsp. sinuata F.White - Mozambique, KwaZulu-Natal
7. Euclea racemosa subsp. zuluensis F.White - Eswatini, Mozambique, KwaZulu-Natal
