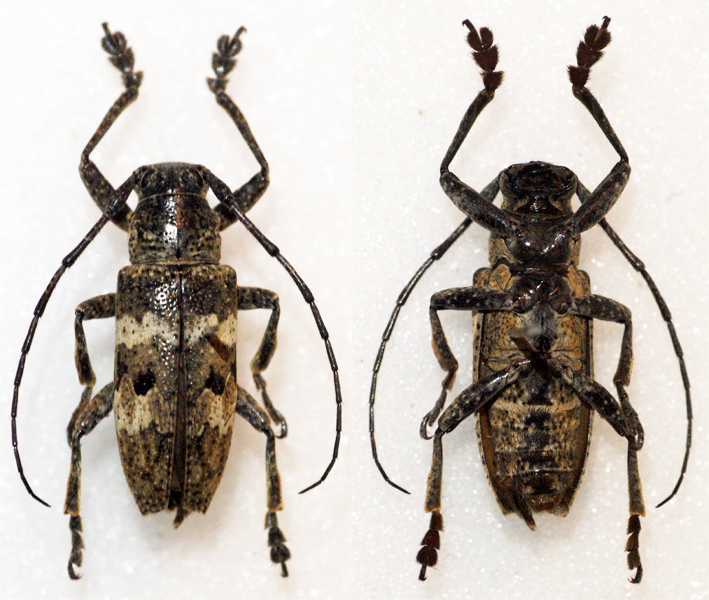
- Abryna grisescens

Scientific classification
- Domain: Eukaryota
- Kingdom: Animalia
- Phylum: Arthropoda
- Class: Insecta
- Order: Coleoptera
- Suborder: Polyphaga
- Infraorder: Cucujiformia
- Family: Cerambycidae
- Tribe: Pteropliini
- Genus: Abryna

= Abryna =

Genus of beetles

Abryna is a genus of beetle in the family Cerambycidae.

Species include:

- Abryna affinis Breuning, 1938
- Abryna basalis Aurivillius, 1908
- Abryna buccinator Pascoe, 1864
- Abryna coenosa Newman, 1842
- Abryna copei Vives, 2009
- Abryna fausta Newman, 1842
- Abryna grisescens Breuning, 1938
- Abryna javanica Kriesche, 1924
- Abryna loochooana Matsushita, 1933
- Abryna metallica Breuning, 1938
- Abryna mindanaoensis Breuning, 1980
- Abryna obscura Schwarzer, 1925
- Abryna regispetri Paiva, 1860
- Abryna rubeta Pascoe, 1864
- Abryna ziczac Heller, 1924
