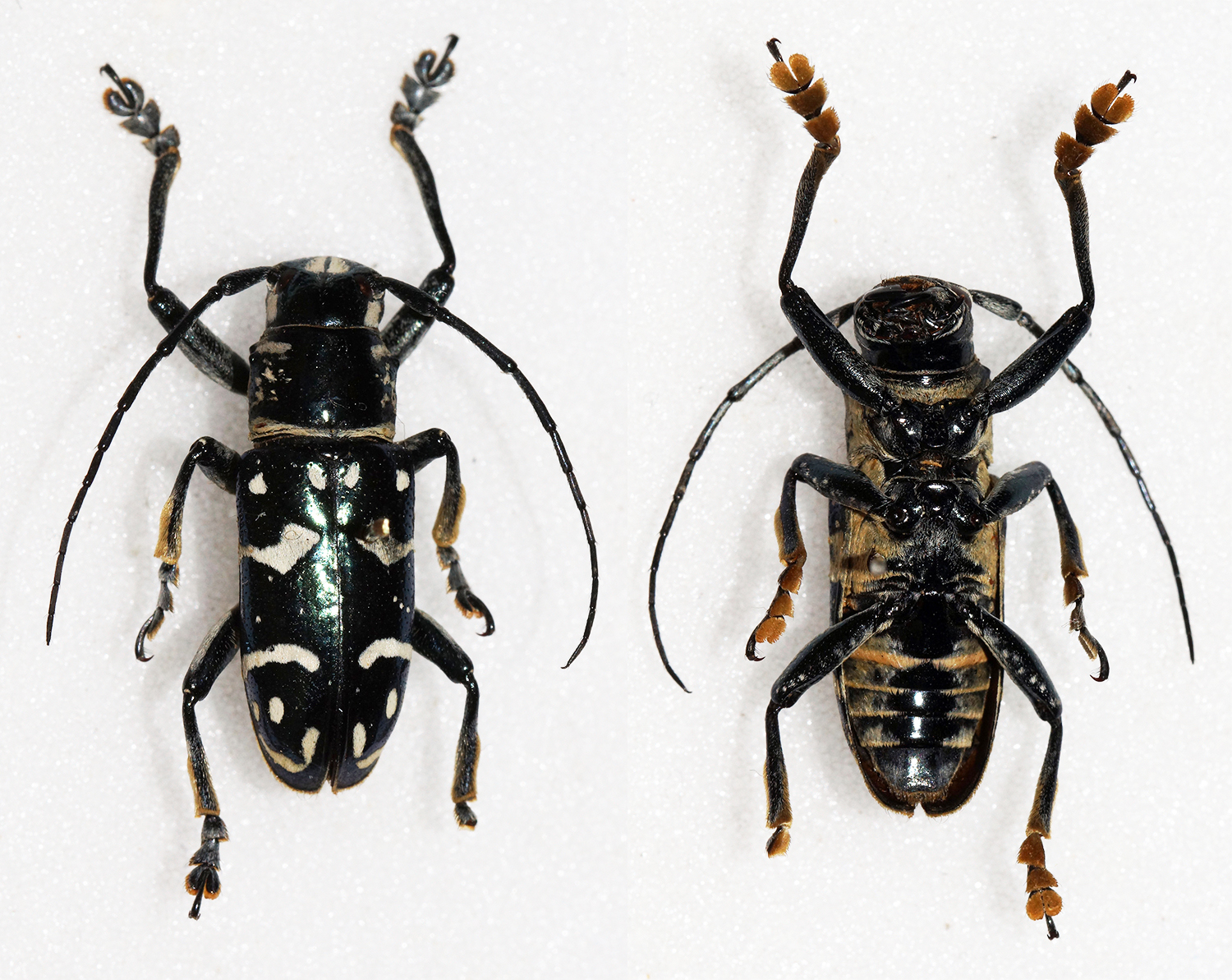
- Faustabryna mindanaoensis

Scientific classification
- Domain: Eukaryota
- Kingdom: Animalia
- Phylum: Arthropoda
- Class: Insecta
- Order: Coleoptera
- Suborder: Polyphaga
- Infraorder: Cucujiformia
- Family: Cerambycidae
- Tribe: Pteropliini
- Genus: Faustabryna

= Faustabryna =

Genus of beetles

Faustabryna is a genus of longhorn beetles of the subfamily Lamiinae, containing the following species:

- Faustabryna fausta (Newman, 1842)
- Faustabryna metallica (Breuning, 1938)
- Faustabryna mindanaoensis (Breuning, 1980)
- Faustabryna vivesi (Breuning, 1981)
- Faustabryna celebiana Vives, 2014
- Faustabryna multialboguttata (Breuning, 1960)
- Faustabryna affinis Vives, 2014
