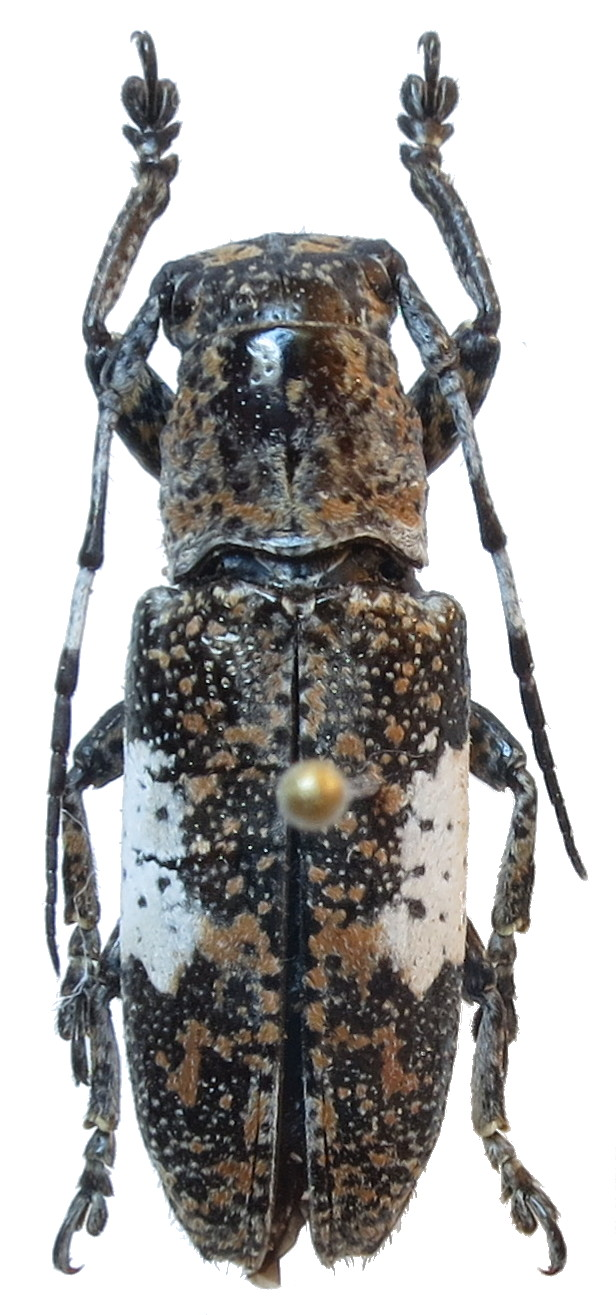
- C. acerdentibus from South Luzon

Scientific classification
- Domain: Eukaryota
- Kingdom: Animalia
- Phylum: Arthropoda
- Class: Insecta
- Order: Coleoptera
- Suborder: Polyphaga
- Infraorder: Cucujiformia
- Family: Cerambycidae
- Tribe: Pteropliini
- Genus: Callimetopus
- Species: C. acerdentibus

Binomial name
- Callimetopus acerdentibus Dela Cruz & Adorada, 2012

= Callimetopus acerdentibus =

Species of beetle

Callimetopus acerdentibus is a species of beetle in the family Cerambycidae. It was described by Dela Cruz and Adorada in 2012.
