= Callimetopus cordifer =

Scientific classification
- Domain: Eukaryota
- Kingdom: Animalia
- Phylum: Arthropoda
- Class: Insecta
- Order: Coleoptera
- Suborder: Polyphaga
- Infraorder: Cucujiformia
- Family: Cerambycidae
- Tribe: Pteropliini
- Genus: Callimetopus
- Species: C. cordifer

Binomial name
- Callimetopus cordifer (Heller, 1924)

Species of beetle

Callimetopus cordifer is a species of beetle in the family Cerambycidae. It was described by Heller in 1924. It is known from the Philippines.
