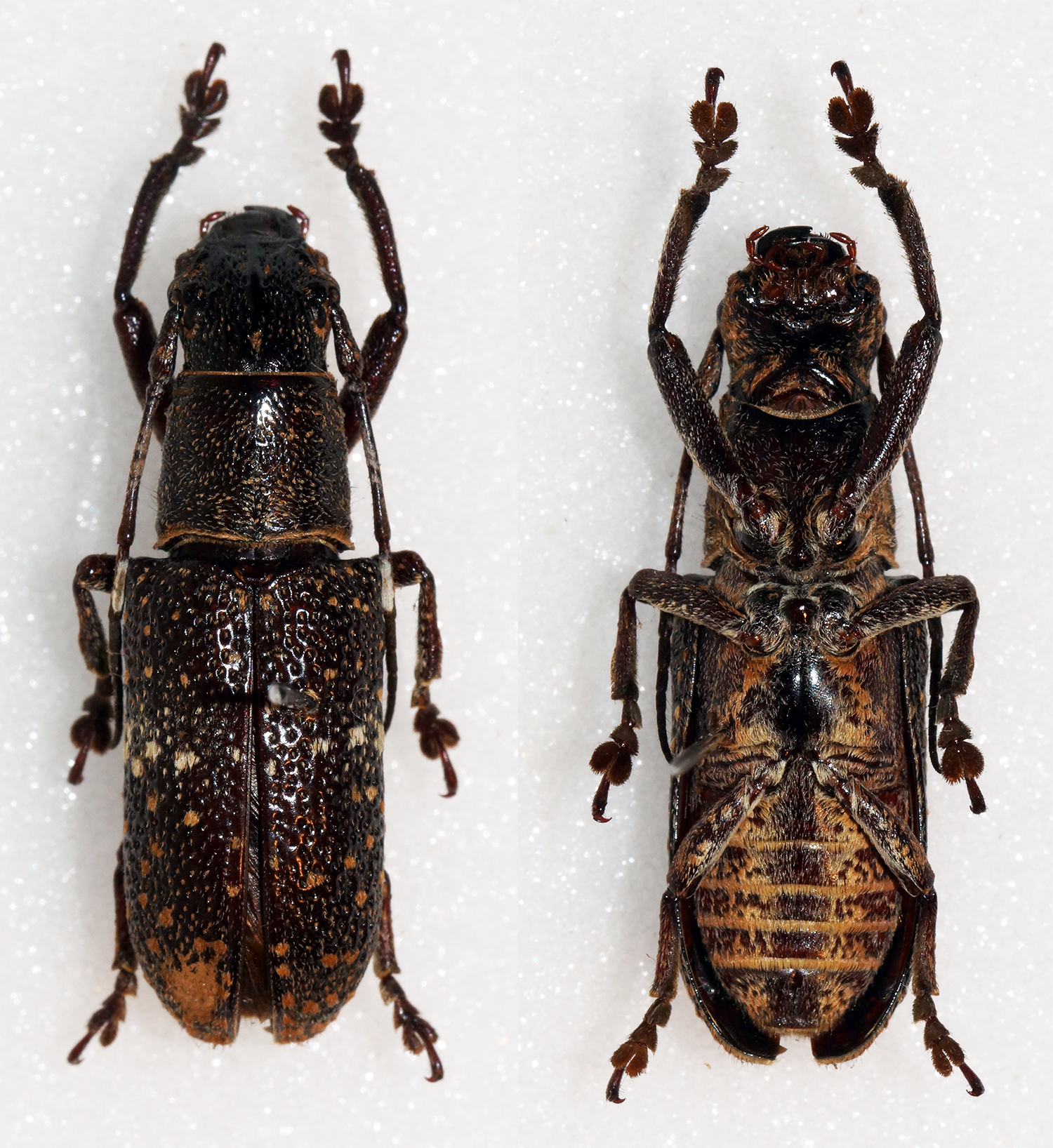

Scientific classification
- Domain: Eukaryota
- Kingdom: Animalia
- Phylum: Arthropoda
- Class: Insecta
- Order: Coleoptera
- Suborder: Polyphaga
- Infraorder: Cucujiformia
- Family: Cerambycidae
- Tribe: Pteropliini
- Genus: Callimetopus
- Species: C. longior

Binomial name
- Callimetopus longior Hüdepohl, 1990

= Callimetopus longior =

Species of beetle

Callimetopus longior is a species of beetles in the family Cerambycidae. It was described by Karl-Ernst Hüdepohl in 1990.
