= Abryna javanica =

Scientific classification
- Kingdom: Animalia
- Phylum: Arthropoda
- Clade: Pancrustacea
- Class: Insecta
- Order: Coleoptera
- Suborder: Polyphaga
- Infraorder: Cucujiformia
- Family: Cerambycidae
- Genus: Abryna
- Species: A. javanica

Binomial name
- Abryna javanica Kriesche, 1924

Species of beetle

Abryna javanica is a species of beetle in the family Cerambycidae. It was described by Kriesche in 1924. It is known from Java.
