= Callimetopus antonkozlovi =

Scientific classification
- Domain: Eukaryota
- Kingdom: Animalia
- Phylum: Arthropoda
- Class: Insecta
- Order: Coleoptera
- Suborder: Polyphaga
- Infraorder: Cucujiformia
- Family: Cerambycidae
- Tribe: Pteropliini
- Genus: Callimetopus
- Species: C. antonkozlovi

Binomial name
- Callimetopus antonkozlovi Barševskis, 2016

Species of beetle

Callimetopus antonkozlovi is a species of beetle in the family Cerambycidae. It was described by Barševskis in 2016.
