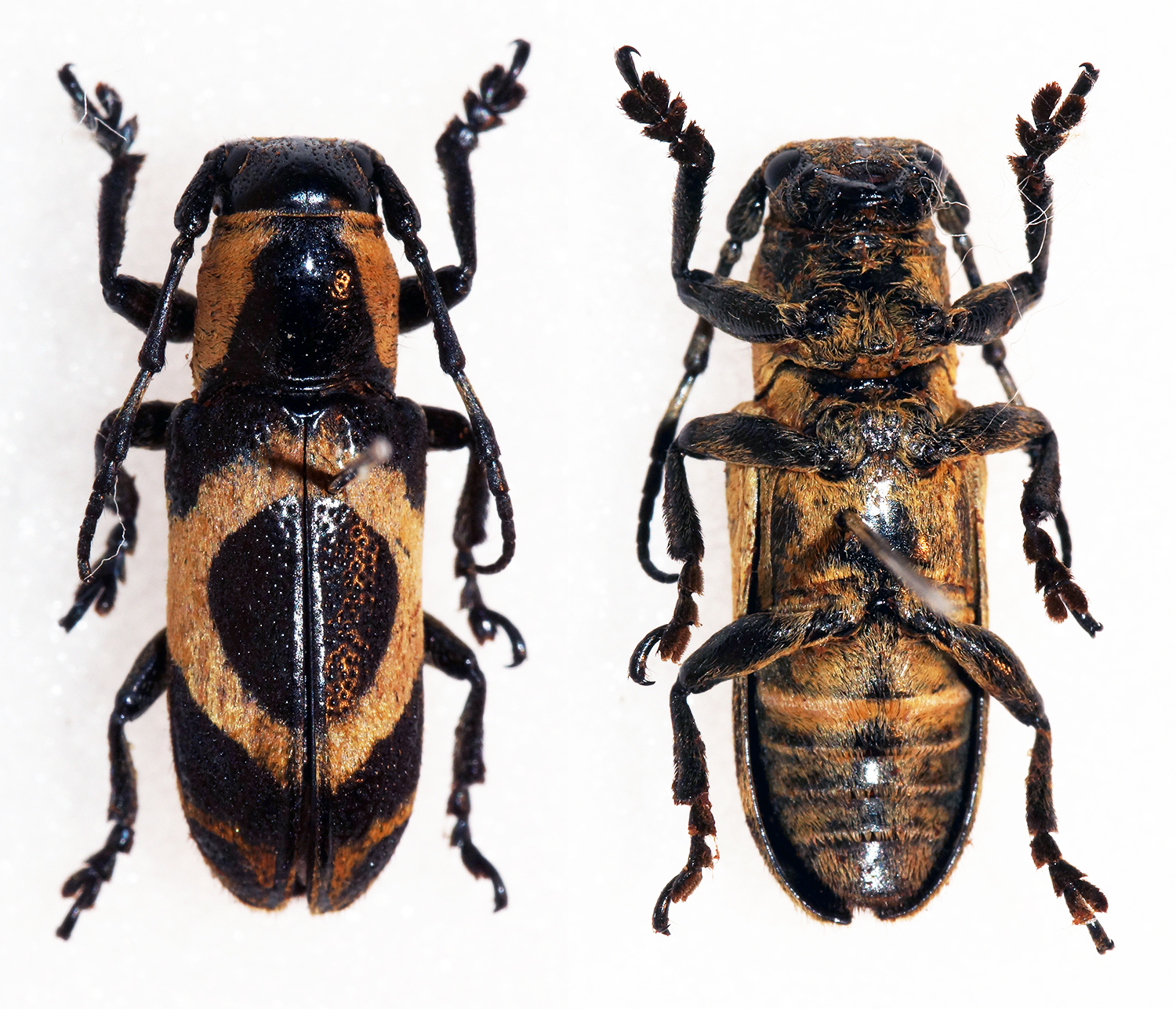

Scientific classification
- Kingdom: Animalia
- Phylum: Arthropoda
- Clade: Pancrustacea
- Class: Insecta
- Order: Coleoptera
- Suborder: Polyphaga
- Infraorder: Cucujiformia
- Family: Cerambycidae
- Genus: Callimetopus
- Species: C. rhombifer

Binomial name
- Callimetopus rhombifer (Heller, 1913)

Synonyms
- Euclea rhombifera Heller, 1913

= Callimetopus rhombifer =

Species of beetle

Callimetopus rhombifer is a species of beetle in the family Cerambycidae. It was described by Heller in 1913. It is known from Sulawesi and the Philippines.
