= Faustabryna celebiana =

Scientific classification
- Domain: Eukaryota
- Kingdom: Animalia
- Phylum: Arthropoda
- Class: Insecta
- Order: Coleoptera
- Suborder: Polyphaga
- Infraorder: Cucujiformia
- Family: Cerambycidae
- Tribe: Pteropliini
- Genus: Faustabryna
- Species: F. celebiana

Binomial name
- Faustabryna celebiana Vives, 2014

Species of beetle

Faustabryna celebiana is a species of beetle in the family Cerambycidae. It was described by Vives in 2014.
