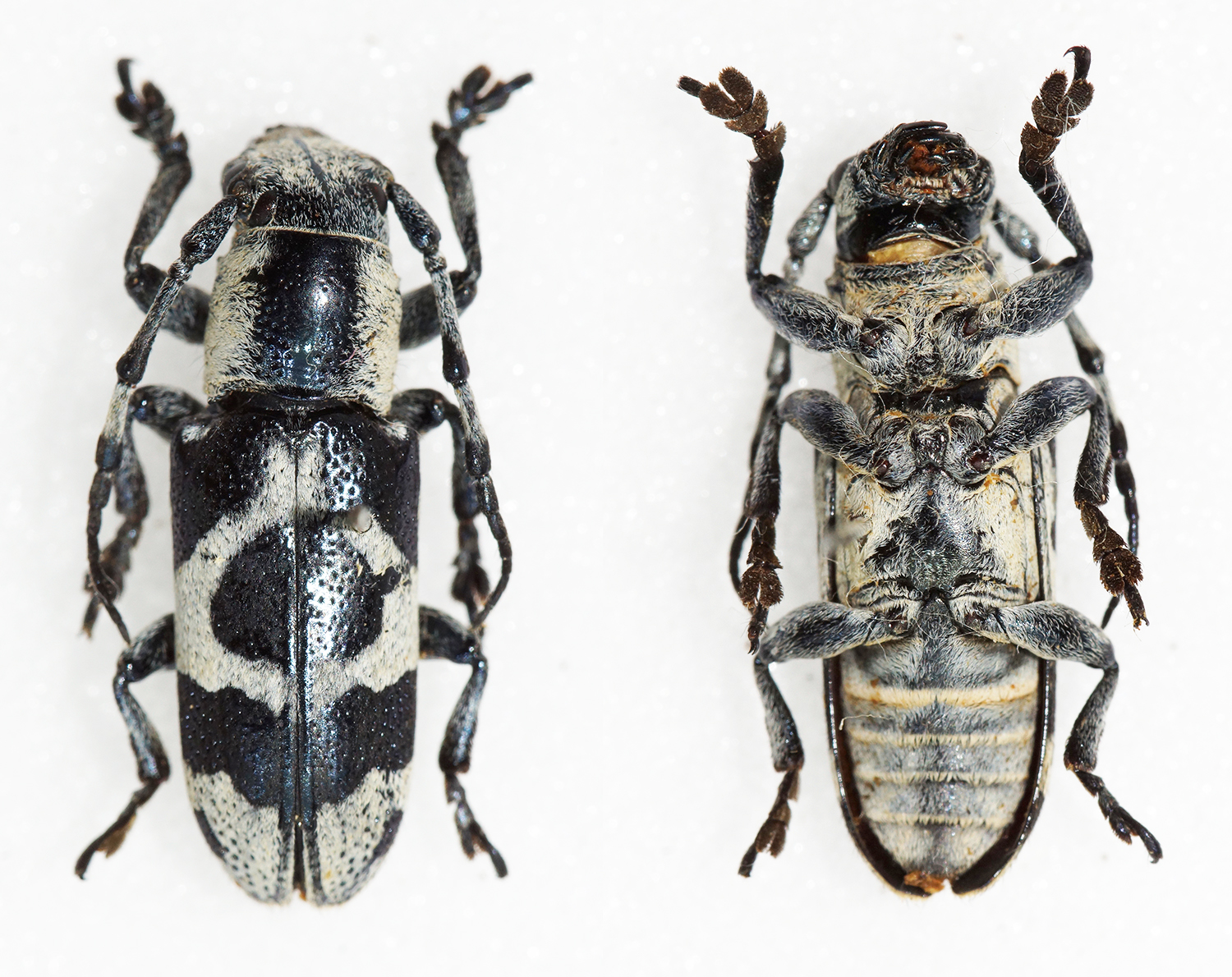

Scientific classification
- Kingdom: Animalia
- Phylum: Arthropoda
- Clade: Pancrustacea
- Class: Insecta
- Order: Coleoptera
- Suborder: Polyphaga
- Infraorder: Cucujiformia
- Family: Cerambycidae
- Genus: Callimetopus
- Species: C. illecebrosus

Binomial name
- Callimetopus illecebrosus (Pascoe, 1865)

Synonyms
- Euclea illecebrosa Pascoe, 1865

= Callimetopus illecebrosus =

Species of beetle

Callimetopus illecebrosus is a species of beetle in the family Cerambycidae. It was described by Francis Polkinghorne Pascoe in 1865, originally under the genus Euclea. It is known from Sulawesi. It contains the varietas Callimetopus illecebrosus var. castus.
