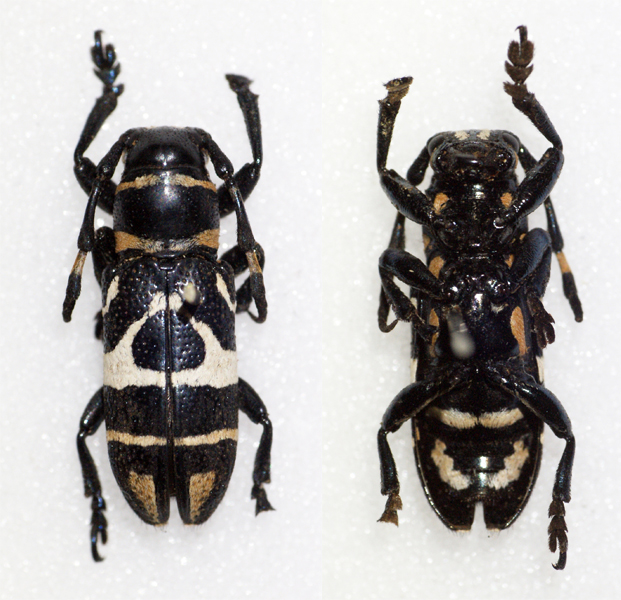

Scientific classification
- Kingdom: Animalia
- Phylum: Arthropoda
- Class: Insecta
- Order: Coleoptera
- Suborder: Polyphaga
- Infraorder: Cucujiformia
- Family: Cerambycidae
- Genus: Callimetopus
- Species: C. siargoanus

Binomial name
- Callimetopus siargoanus (Schultze, 1919)

= Callimetopus siargoanus =

Species of beetle

Callimetopus siargoanus is a species of beetle in the family Cerambycidae. It was described by Schultze in 1919. It is known from the Philippines.
