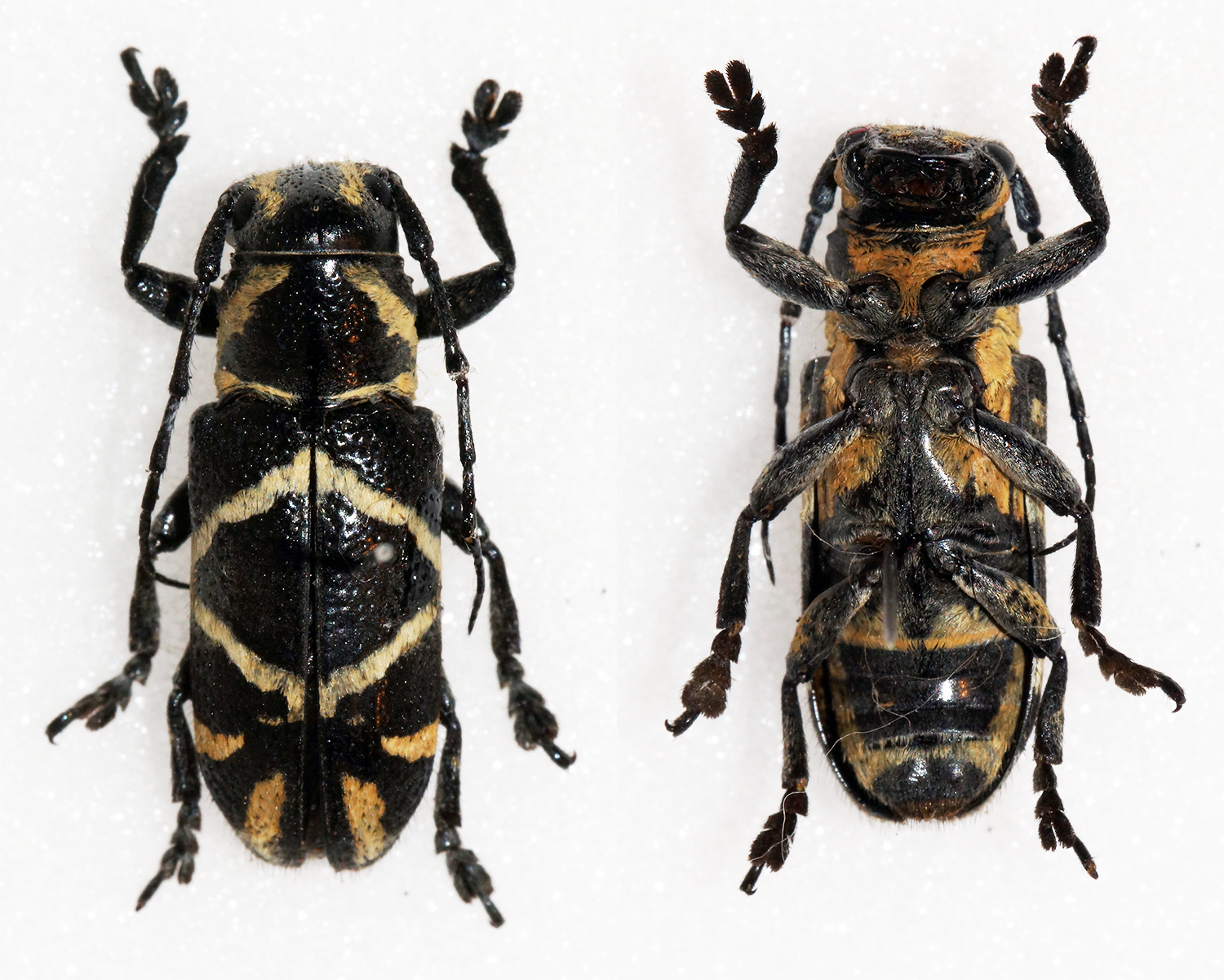

Scientific classification
- Kingdom: Animalia
- Phylum: Arthropoda
- Class: Insecta
- Order: Coleoptera
- Suborder: Polyphaga
- Infraorder: Cucujiformia
- Family: Cerambycidae
- Genus: Callimetopus
- Species: C. panayanus

Binomial name
- Callimetopus panayanus (Schultze, 1920)

Synonyms
- Euclea panayana Schultze, 1920

= Callimetopus panayanus =

Species of beetle

Callimetopus panayanus is a species of beetle in the family Cerambycidae. It was described by Schultze in 1920, originally under the genus Euclea. It is known from the Philippines.
