= Callimetopus ochraceosignatus =

Scientific classification
- Kingdom: Animalia
- Phylum: Arthropoda
- Class: Insecta
- Order: Coleoptera
- Suborder: Polyphaga
- Infraorder: Cucujiformia
- Family: Cerambycidae
- Genus: Callimetopus
- Species: C. ochraceosignatus

Binomial name
- Callimetopus ochraceosignatus Breuning, 1959

Species of beetle

Callimetopus ochraceosignatus is a species of beetle in the family Cerambycidae. It was described by Stephan von Breuning in 1959. It is known from the Philippines.
