= Callimetopus cynthioides =

Scientific classification
- Kingdom: Animalia
- Phylum: Arthropoda
- Class: Insecta
- Order: Coleoptera
- Suborder: Polyphaga
- Infraorder: Cucujiformia
- Family: Cerambycidae
- Genus: Callimetopus
- Species: C. cynthioides

Binomial name
- Callimetopus cynthioides Breuning, 1958

Synonyms
- Callimetopus cinthioides Breuning, 1958

Species of beetle

Callimetopus cynthioides is a species of beetle in the family Cerambycidae. It was described by Stephan von Breuning in 1958. It is known from the Philippines.
