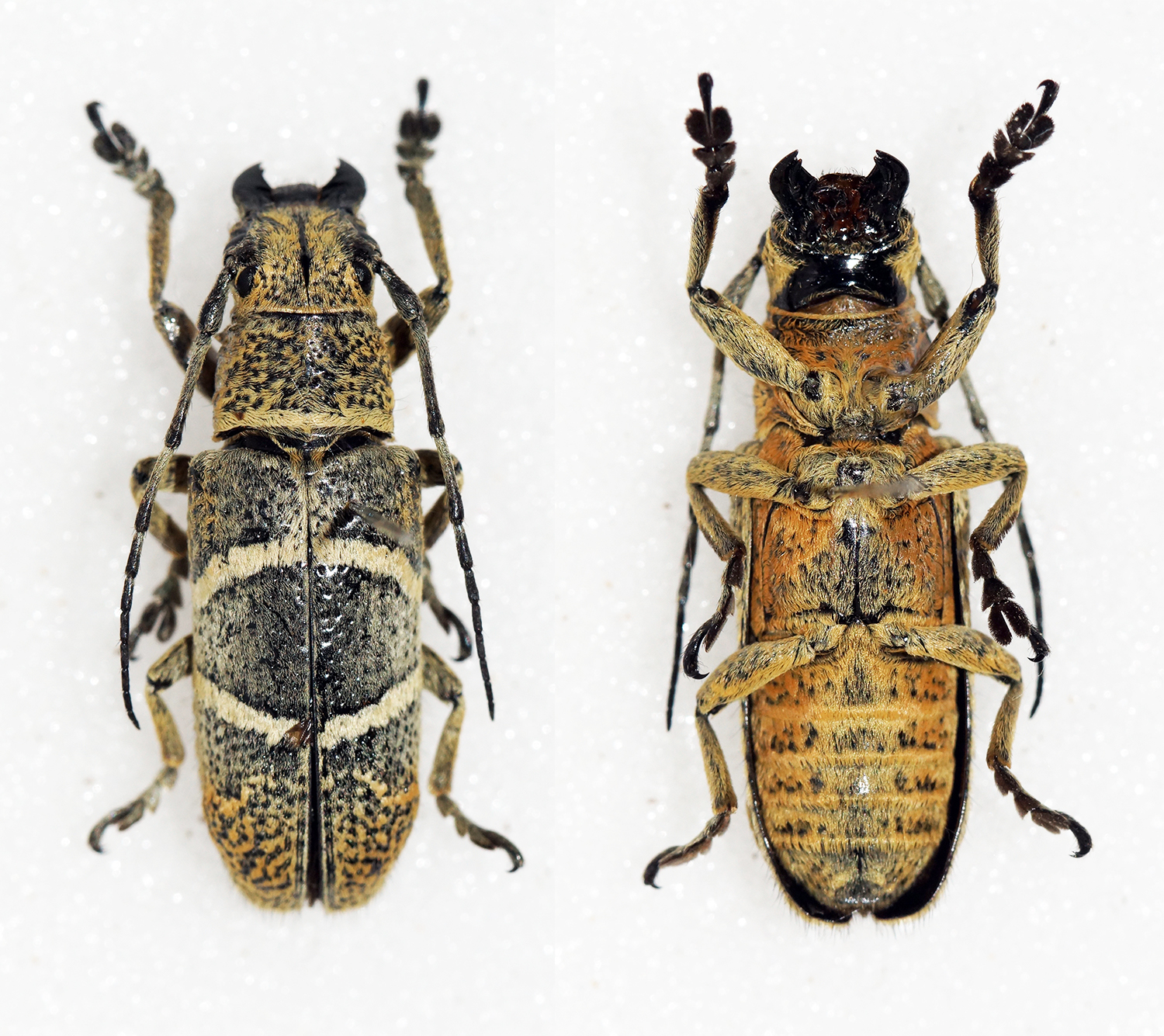

Scientific classification
- Domain: Eukaryota
- Kingdom: Animalia
- Phylum: Arthropoda
- Class: Insecta
- Order: Coleoptera
- Suborder: Polyphaga
- Infraorder: Cucujiformia
- Family: Cerambycidae
- Tribe: Pteropliini
- Genus: Callimetopus
- Species: C. bilineatus

Binomial name
- Callimetopus bilineatus Vives, 2015

= Callimetopus bilineatus =

Species of beetle

Callimetopus bilineatus is a species of beetle in the family Cerambycidae. It was described by Vives in 2015.
