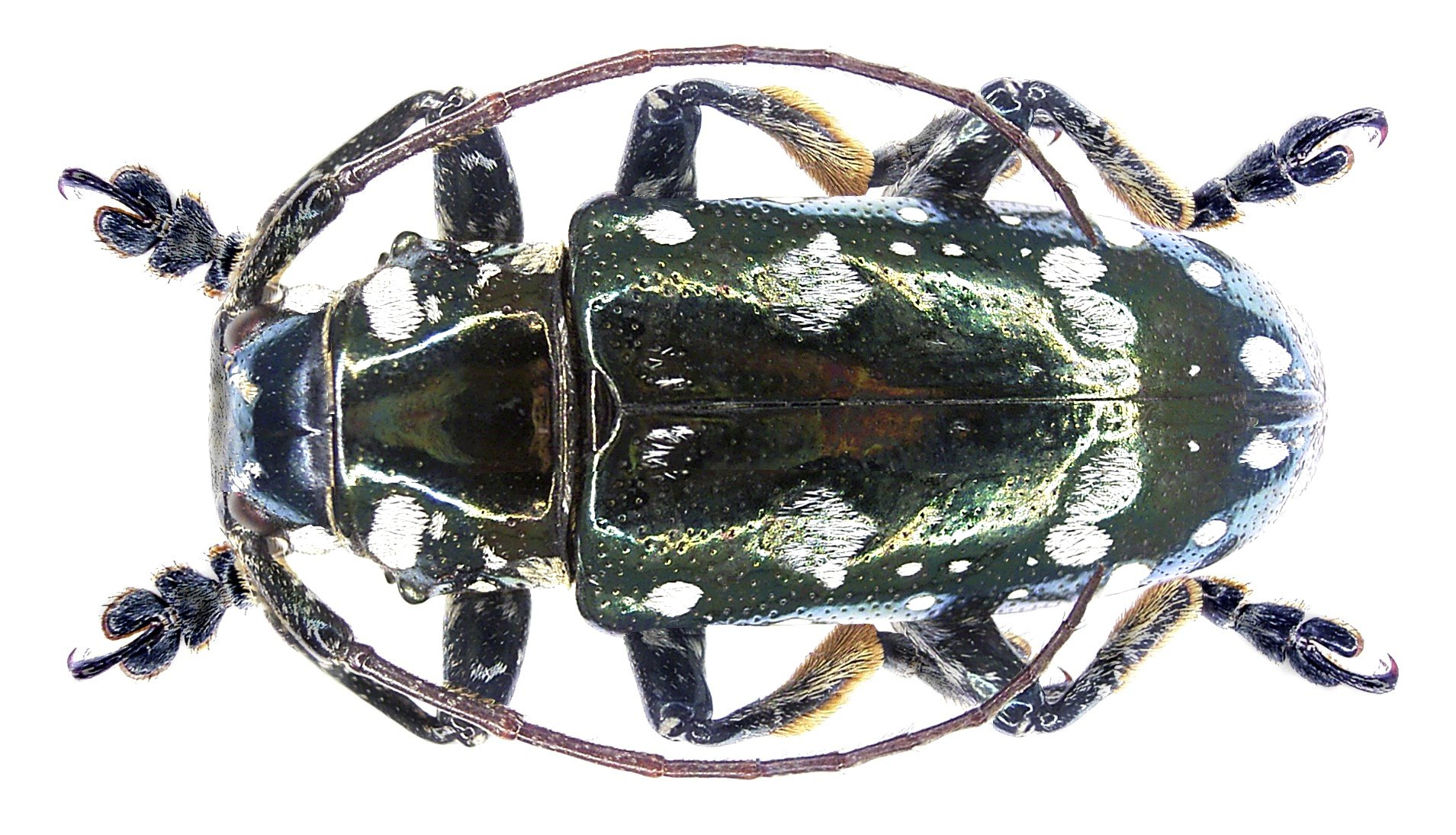

Scientific classification
- Kingdom: Animalia
- Phylum: Arthropoda
- Class: Insecta
- Order: Coleoptera
- Suborder: Polyphaga
- Infraorder: Cucujiformia
- Family: Cerambycidae
- Genus: Faustabryna
- Species: F. metallica

Binomial name
- Faustabryna metallica (Breuning, 1938)

Synonyms
- Abryna (Faustabryna) metallica (Breuning, 1938); Abryna metallica Breuning, 1938

= Faustabryna metallica =

Species of beetle

Faustabryna metallica is a species of beetle in the family Cerambycidae. It was described by Stephan von Breuning in 1938, originally under the genus Abryna. It is known from the Philippines.
