= Callimetopus shavrini =

Scientific classification
- Kingdom: Animalia
- Phylum: Arthropoda
- Class: Insecta
- Order: Coleoptera
- Suborder: Polyphaga
- Infraorder: Cucujiformia
- Family: Cerambycidae
- Genus: Callimetopus
- Species: C. shavrini

Binomial name
- Callimetopus shavrini Barševskis, 2015

Species of beetle

Callimetopus shavrini is a species of beetle in the family Cerambycidae. It was described by Barševskis in 2015.
