= Abryna affinis =

Scientific classification
- Domain: Eukaryota
- Kingdom: Animalia
- Phylum: Arthropoda
- Class: Insecta
- Order: Coleoptera
- Suborder: Polyphaga
- Infraorder: Cucujiformia
- Family: Cerambycidae
- Tribe: Pteropliini
- Genus: Abryna
- Species: A. affinis

Binomial name
- Abryna affinis Breuning, 1938

Species of beetle

Abryna affinis is a species of beetle in the family Cerambycidae. It was described by Stephan von Breuning in 1938. It is found in the Philippines.
