= Callimetopus pulchellus =

Scientific classification
- Kingdom: Animalia
- Phylum: Arthropoda
- Class: Insecta
- Order: Coleoptera
- Suborder: Polyphaga
- Infraorder: Cucujiformia
- Family: Cerambycidae
- Genus: Callimetopus
- Species: C. pulchellus

Binomial name
- Callimetopus pulchellus (Schultze, 1922)

Synonyms
- Callimetopus pulchellus (Schultze, 1922); Euclea pulchella Schultze, 1922

Species of beetle

Callimetopus pulchellus is a species of beetle in the family Cerambycidae. It was described by Schultze in 1922. It is known from the Philippines.
