= Faustabryna multialboguttata =

Scientific classification
- Kingdom: Animalia
- Phylum: Arthropoda
- Class: Insecta
- Order: Coleoptera
- Suborder: Polyphaga
- Infraorder: Cucujiformia
- Family: Cerambycidae
- Genus: Faustabryna
- Species: F. multialboguttata

Binomial name
- Faustabryna multialboguttata (Breuning, 1960)

Synonyms
- Callimetopus multialboguttatus Breuning, 1960; Acronia multialbosignata (Breuning, 1960) (misspelling)

Species of beetle

Faustabryna multialboguttata is a species of beetle in the family Cerambycidae. It was described by Stephan von Breuning in 1960. It is known from the Philippines.
