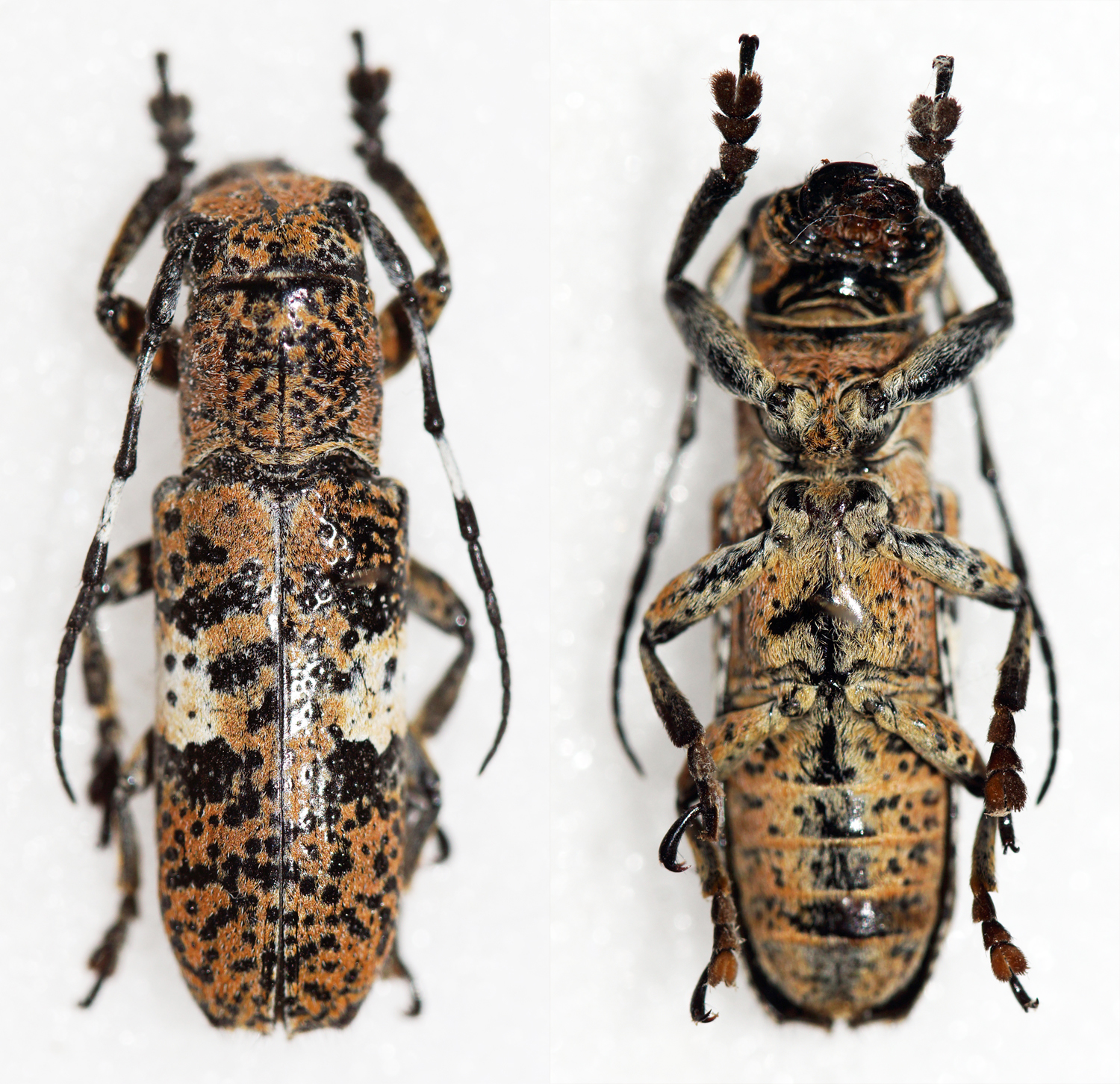

Scientific classification
- Domain: Eukaryota
- Kingdom: Animalia
- Phylum: Arthropoda
- Class: Insecta
- Order: Coleoptera
- Suborder: Polyphaga
- Infraorder: Cucujiformia
- Family: Cerambycidae
- Tribe: Pteropliini
- Genus: Callimetopus
- Species: C. capito

Binomial name
- Callimetopus capito (Pascoe, 1865)

Synonyms
- Euclea capito Pascoe, 1865

= Callimetopus capito =

Species of beetle

Callimetopus capito is a species of beetle in the family Cerambycidae. It was described by Francis Polkinghorne Pascoe in 1865, originally under the genus Euclea. It is known from the Philippines. It feeds on Mangifera indica, Barringtonia asiatica, and Terminalia catappa. It contains the varietas Callimetopus capito var. mesoleucus.
