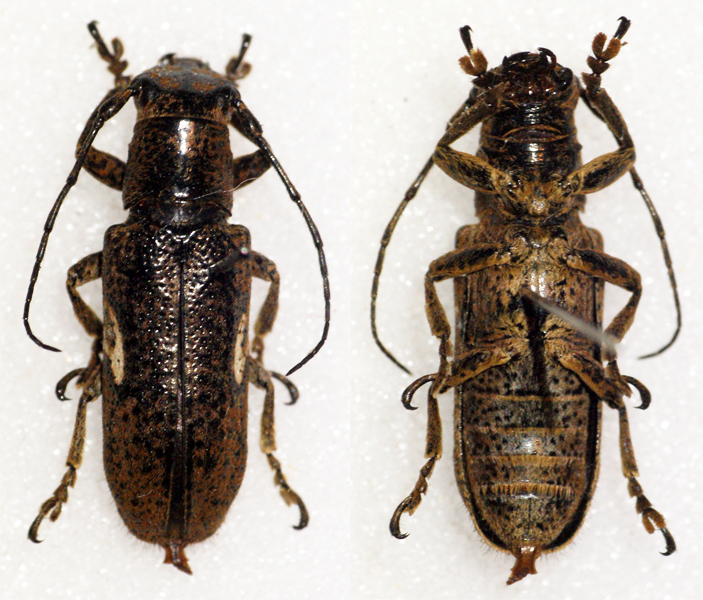

Scientific classification
- Domain: Eukaryota
- Kingdom: Animalia
- Phylum: Arthropoda
- Class: Insecta
- Order: Coleoptera
- Suborder: Polyphaga
- Infraorder: Cucujiformia
- Family: Cerambycidae
- Tribe: Pteropliini
- Genus: Callimetopus
- Species: C. cynthia

Binomial name
- Callimetopus cynthia Thomson, 1865

Synonyms
- Euclea cynthia Thomson, 1865; Proteuclea sulphureomaculata Schultze, 1916

= Callimetopus cynthia =

Species of beetle

Callimetopus cynthia is a species of beetle in the family Cerambycidae. It was described by James Thomson in 1865, originally under the genus Euclea. It is known from the Philippines.
