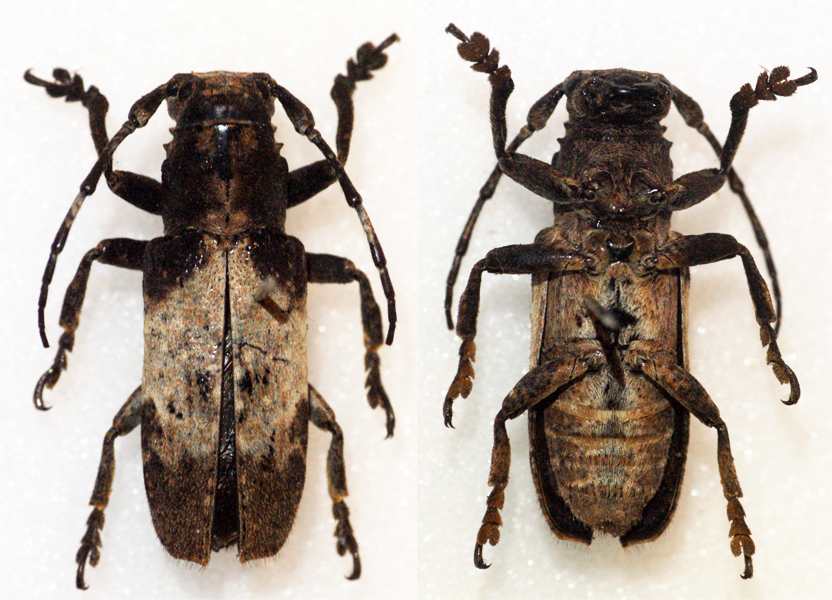

Scientific classification
- Domain: Eukaryota
- Kingdom: Animalia
- Phylum: Arthropoda
- Class: Insecta
- Order: Coleoptera
- Suborder: Polyphaga
- Infraorder: Cucujiformia
- Family: Cerambycidae
- Tribe: Pteropliini
- Genus: Callimetopus
- Species: C. albatus

Binomial name
- Callimetopus albatus (Newman, 1842)

Synonyms
- Euclea albata Newman, 1842

= Callimetopus albatus =

Species of beetle

Callimetopus albatus is a species of beetle in the family Cerambycidae. It was described by Newman in 1842. It is known from the Philippines.
