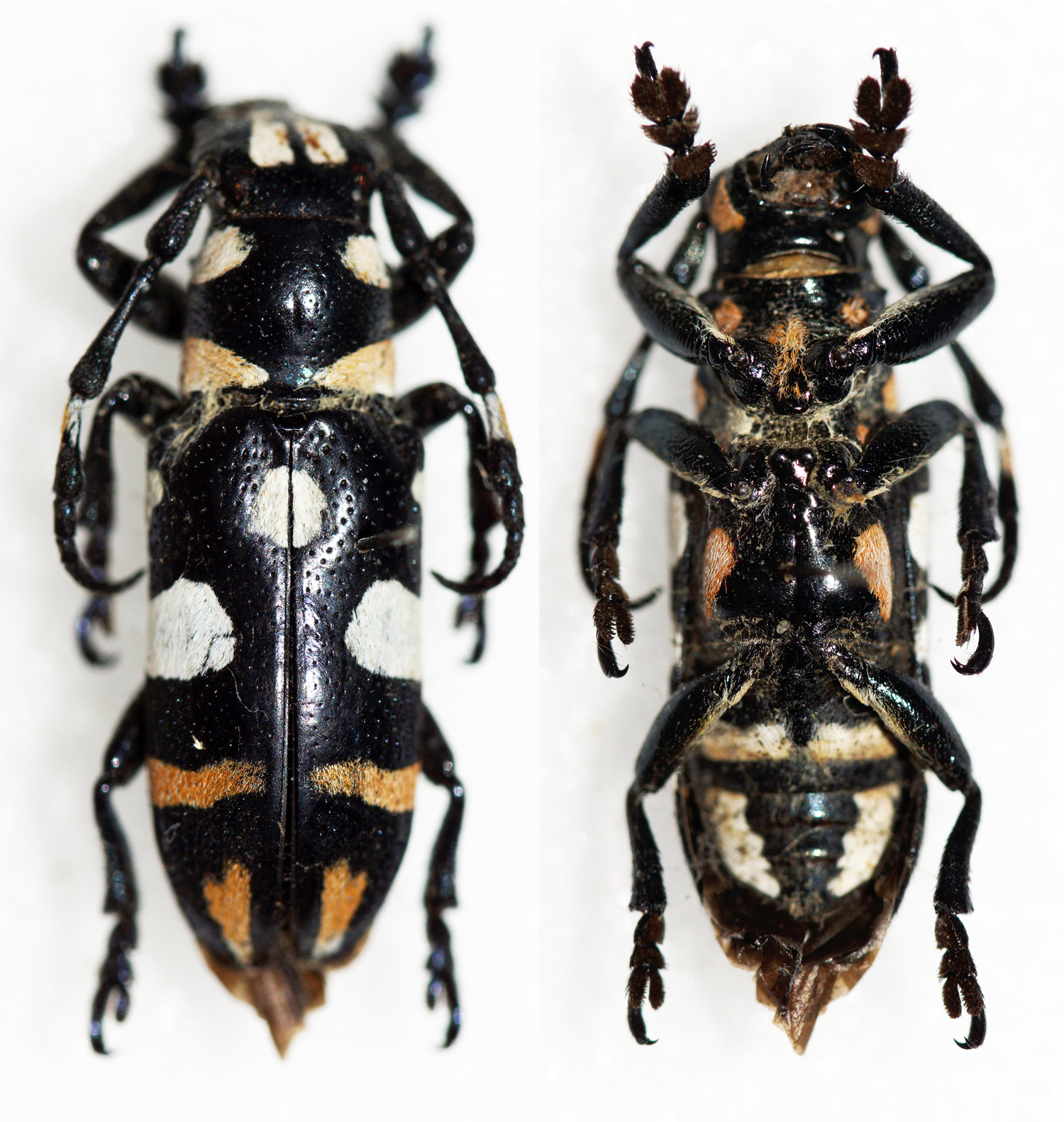

Scientific classification
- Domain: Eukaryota
- Kingdom: Animalia
- Phylum: Arthropoda
- Class: Insecta
- Order: Coleoptera
- Suborder: Polyphaga
- Infraorder: Cucujiformia
- Family: Cerambycidae
- Tribe: Pteropliini
- Genus: Callimetopus
- Species: C. tagalus

Binomial name
- Callimetopus tagalus (Heller, 1899)

Synonyms
- Euclea tagala Heller, 1899

= Callimetopus tagalus =

Species of beetle

Callimetopus tagalus is a species of beetle in the family Cerambycidae. It was described by Heller in 1899, originally under the genus Euclea. It is known from the Philippines.

== Varietas ==
- Callimetopus tagalus var. rufofasciatus (Schultze, 1919)
- Callimetopus tagalus var. tricolor (Heller, 1921)
