= Faustabryna fausta =

Scientific classification
- Domain: Eukaryota
- Kingdom: Animalia
- Phylum: Arthropoda
- Class: Insecta
- Order: Coleoptera
- Suborder: Polyphaga
- Infraorder: Cucujiformia
- Family: Cerambycidae
- Tribe: Pteropliini
- Genus: Faustabryna
- Species: F. fausta

Binomial name
- Faustabryna fausta Newman, 1842

Synonyms
- Abryna (Faustabryna) fausta (Newman, 1842); Abryna fausta Newman, 1842

Species of beetle

Faustabryna fausta is a species of beetle in the family Cerambycidae. It was described by Newman in 1842, originally under the genus Abryna. It is known from the Philippines.
