= Callimetopus lumawigi =

Scientific classification
- Kingdom: Animalia
- Phylum: Arthropoda
- Class: Insecta
- Order: Coleoptera
- Suborder: Polyphaga
- Infraorder: Cucujiformia
- Family: Cerambycidae
- Genus: Callimetopus
- Species: C. lumawigi

Binomial name
- Callimetopus lumawigi Breuning, 1980

Synonyms
- Callimetopus lazarevi Barševskis, 2015

Species of beetle

Callimetopus lumawigi is a species of beetle in the family Cerambycidae. It was described by Stephan von Breuning in 1980. It is known from the Philippines.
