= Callimetopus nigritarsis =

Scientific classification
- Kingdom: Animalia
- Phylum: Arthropoda
- Class: Insecta
- Order: Coleoptera
- Suborder: Polyphaga
- Infraorder: Cucujiformia
- Family: Cerambycidae
- Genus: Callimetopus
- Species: C. nigritarsis

Binomial name
- Callimetopus nigritarsis (Pascoe, 1865)

Synonyms
- Euclea bizonata Thomson, 1865; Euclea nigritarsis Pascoe, 1865

Species of beetle

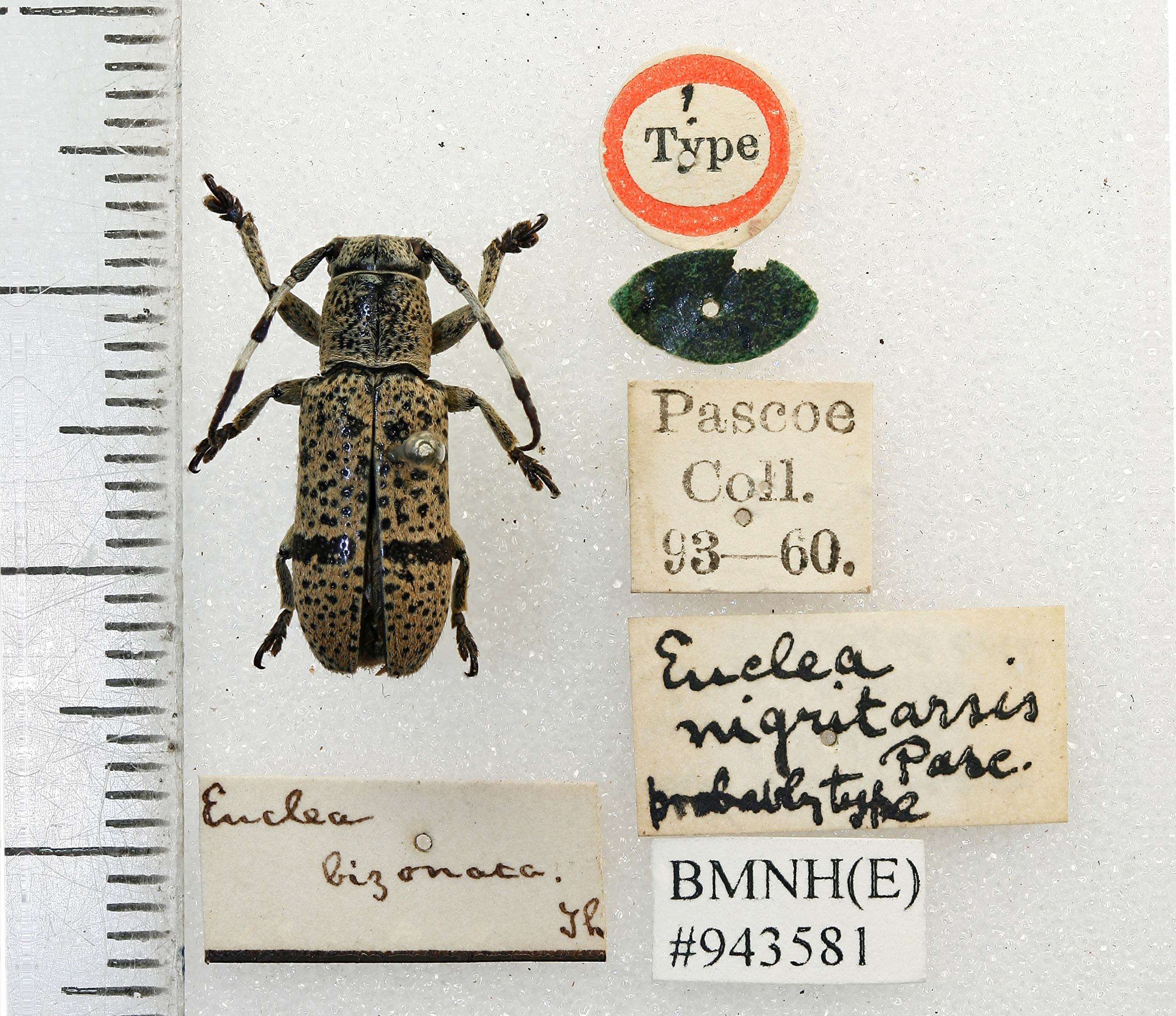
Callimetopus nigritarsis

Callimetopus nigritarsis is a species of beetle in the family Cerambycidae. It was described by Francis Polkinghorne Pascoe in 1865. It is known from Moluccas.
