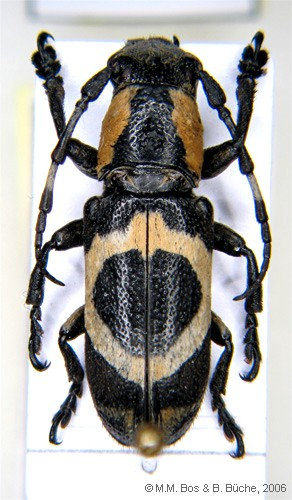
- Callimetopus castus

Scientific classification
- Kingdom: Animalia
- Phylum: Arthropoda
- Class: Insecta
- Order: Coleoptera
- Suborder: Polyphaga
- Infraorder: Cucujiformia
- Family: Cerambycidae
- Tribe: Pteropliini
- Genus: Callimetopus; Blanchard, 1853

= Callimetopus =

Genus of beetles

Callimetopus, described by Émile Blanchard in 1853, is a genus of longhorn beetle belonging to the subfamily Lamiinae, tribe Pteropliini. It is widespread in Southeast Asia with many species in the Philippines and the adjacent islands.

== Species ==
The genus includes the following species:

- Callimetopus acerdentibus Dela Cruz & Adorada, 2012
- Callimetopus albatus (Newman, 1842)
- Callimetopus anichtchenkoi Barševskis, 2015
- Callimetopus antonkozlovi Barševskis, 2016
- Callimetopus bilineatus Vives, 2015
- Callimetopus bukejsi Barševskis, 2016
- Callimetopus bumbierisi Barševskis, 2018
- Callimetopus cabrasae Barševskis, 2018
- Callimetopus capito (Pascoe, 1865)
- Callimetopus cordifer (Heller, 1924)
- Callimetopus cretumus Dela Cruz & Adorada, 2012
- Callimetopus cynthia Thomson, 1865
- Callimetopus cynthioides Breuning, 1958
- Callimetopus danilevskyi Barševskis, 2015
- Callimetopus degeneratus (Heller, 1924)
- Callimetopus gloriosus (Schultze, 1922)
- Callimetopus griseus Breuning, 1960
- Callimetopus havai Barševskis, 2019
- Callimetopus illecebrosus (Pascoe, 1865)
- Callimetopus irroratus (Newman, 1842)
- Callimetopus juliae Barševskis, 2016
- Callimetopus kalninsi Barševskis, 2019
- Callimetopus laterivitta (Heller, 1915)
- Callimetopus lituratus Aurivillius, 1926
- Callimetopus longicollis (Schwarzer, 1931)
- Callimetopus longior Hüdepohl, 1990
- Callimetopus lumawigi Breuning, 1980
- Callimetopus marinduquensis Barševskis, 2018
- Callimetopus mindorensis Dela Cruz & Adorada, 2012
- Callimetopus miroshnikovi Barševskis, 2016
- Callimetopus multialboguttatus Breuning, 1960
- Callimetopus nigritarsis (Pascoe, 1865)
- Callimetopus niveuseta Dela Cruz & Adorada, 2012
- Callimetopus ochraceosignatus Breuning, 1959
- Callimetopus ornatus (Schultze, 1934)
- Callimetopus palawanus (Schultze, 1934)
- Callimetopus panayanus (Schultze, 1920)
- Callimetopus pantherinus Blanchard, 1855
- Callimetopus paracasta Breuning, 1965
- Callimetopus pectoralis Dela Cruz & Adorada, 2012
- Callimetopus principalis (Heller, 1924)
- Callimetopus pulchellus (Schultze, 1922)
- Callimetopus rhombifer (Heller, 1913)
- Callimetopus ruficollis (Heller, 1915)
- Callimetopus samarensis Vives, 2012
- Callimetopus santossilvai Barševskis, 2016
- Callimetopus shavrini Barševskis, 2015
- Callimetopus siargoanus (Schultze, 1919)
- Callimetopus stanleyi Dela Cruz & Adorada, 2012
- Callimetopus superbus Breuning, 1947
- Callimetopus tagalus (Heller, 1899)
- Callimetopus telnovi Barševskis, 2020
- Callimetopus tsinkevichi Barševskis, 2018
- Callimetopus variolosus (Schultze, 1920)
- Callimetopus vivesi Breuning, 1981
- Callimetopus zhantievi Barševskis, 2015
