= Callimetopus multialboguttatus =

Scientific classification
- Kingdom: Animalia
- Phylum: Arthropoda
- Class: Insecta
- Order: Coleoptera
- Suborder: Polyphaga
- Infraorder: Cucujiformia
- Family: Cerambycidae
- Genus: Callimetopus
- Species: C. multialboguttatus

Binomial name
- Callimetopus multialboguttatus Breuning, 1960

Synonyms
- Callimetopus multialboguttatus Breuning, 1960; Acronia multialbosignata (Breuning, 1960) (misspelling) m

Species of beetle

Callimetopus multialboguttatus is a species of beetle in the family Cerambycidae. It was described by Stephan von Breuning in 1960. It is known from the Philippines.
