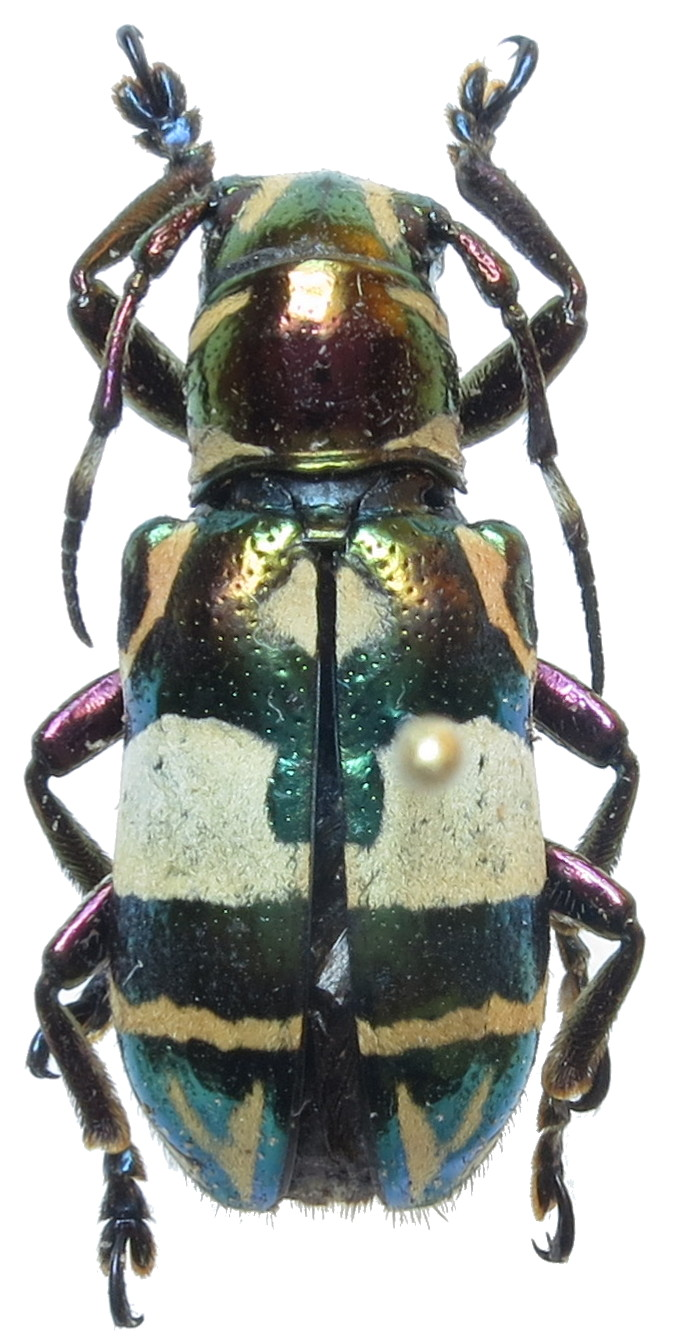
- C. superbus from Philippines]]

Scientific classification
- Kingdom: Animalia
- Phylum: Arthropoda
- Class: Insecta
- Order: Coleoptera
- Suborder: Polyphaga
- Infraorder: Cucujiformia
- Family: Cerambycidae
- Genus: Callimetopus
- Species: C. superbus

Binomial name
- Callimetopus superbus Breuning, 1947

Synonyms
- Callimetopus superbus Breuning, 1947

= Callimetopus superbus =

Species of beetle

Callimetopus superbus is a species of beetle in the family Cerambycidae. It was described by Stephan von Breuning in 1947. It is known from the Philippines.
