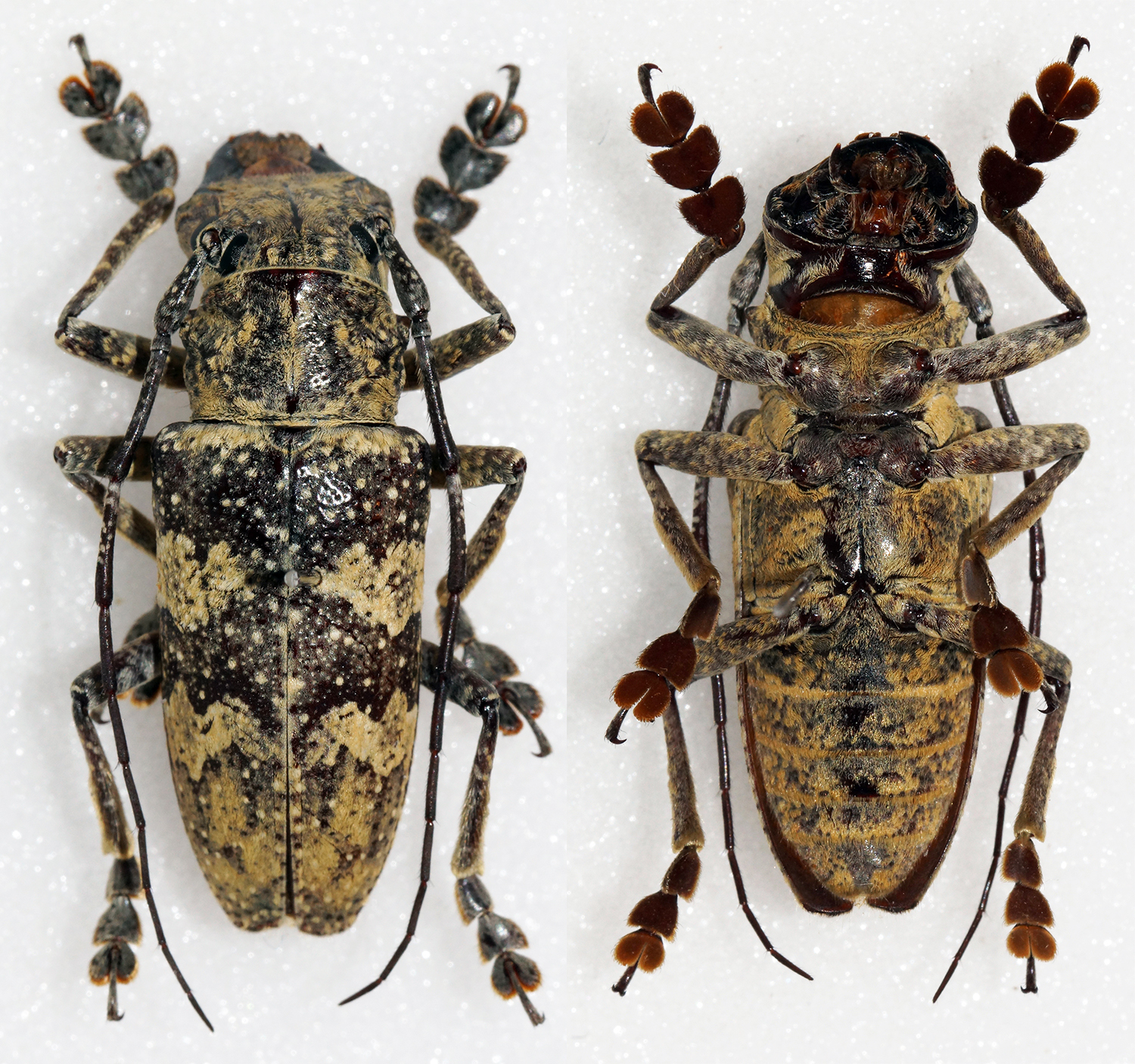

Scientific classification
- Domain: Eukaryota
- Kingdom: Animalia
- Phylum: Arthropoda
- Class: Insecta
- Order: Coleoptera
- Suborder: Polyphaga
- Infraorder: Cucujiformia
- Family: Cerambycidae
- Tribe: Pteropliini
- Genus: Abryna
- Species: A. regispetri

Binomial name
- Abryna regispetri Paiva, 1860

= Abryna regispetri =

Species of beetle

Abryna regispetri is a species of beetle in the family Cerambycidae found in Eastern Asian countries like Cambodia, China, Laos, Malaysia, Myanmar and Thailand.
