= Abryna ziczac =

Scientific classification
- Domain: Eukaryota
- Kingdom: Animalia
- Phylum: Arthropoda
- Class: Insecta
- Order: Coleoptera
- Suborder: Polyphaga
- Infraorder: Cucujiformia
- Family: Cerambycidae
- Tribe: Pteropliini
- Genus: Abryna
- Species: A. ziczac

Binomial name
- Abryna ziczac Heller, 1924

Species of beetle

Abryna ziczac is a species of beetle in the family Cerambycidae. It was described by Heller in 1924. It is known from the Philippines.
