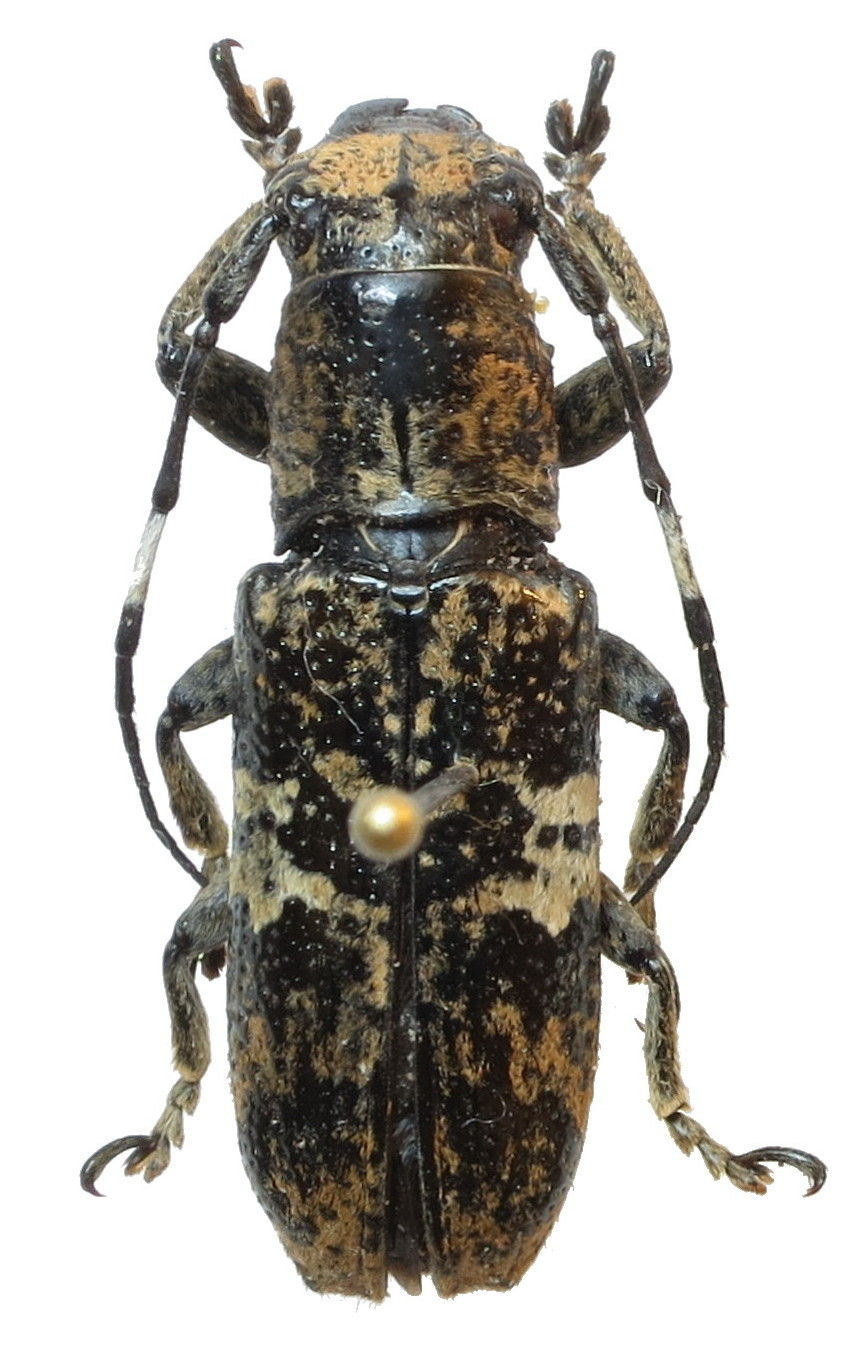
- C. irroratus bifasciata from Philippines

Scientific classification
- Domain: Eukaryota
- Kingdom: Animalia
- Phylum: Arthropoda
- Class: Insecta
- Order: Coleoptera
- Suborder: Polyphaga
- Infraorder: Cucujiformia
- Family: Cerambycidae
- Tribe: Pteropliini
- Genus: Callimetopus
- Species: C. irroratus

Binomial name
- Callimetopus irroratus (Newman, 1842)

Synonyms
- Euclea irrorata Newman, 1842

= Callimetopus irroratus =

Species of beetle

Callimetopus irroratus is a species of beetle in the family Cerambycidae. It was described by Newman in 1842, originally under the genus Euclea. It is known from the Philippines.

== Varietas ==
- Callimetopus irroratus var. albidus Breuning, 1947
- Callimetopus irroratus var. bifasciatus (Fisher, 1943)
