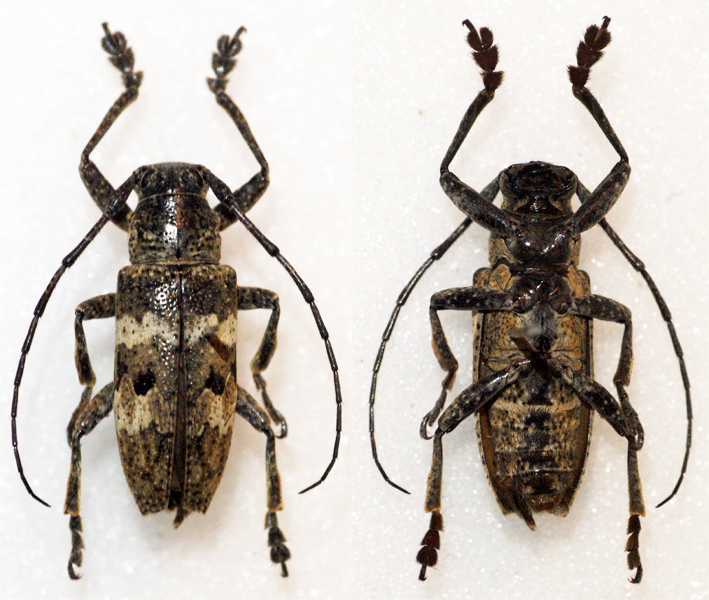

Scientific classification
- Kingdom: Animalia
- Phylum: Arthropoda
- Class: Insecta
- Order: Coleoptera
- Suborder: Polyphaga
- Infraorder: Cucujiformia
- Family: Cerambycidae
- Genus: Abryna
- Species: A. grisescens

Binomial name
- Abryna grisescens Breuning, 1938

= Abryna grisescens =

Species of beetle

Abryna grisescens is a species of beetle in the family Cerambycidae found in Eastern Asia in countries like Laos, Malaysia, Philippines and Thailand.
