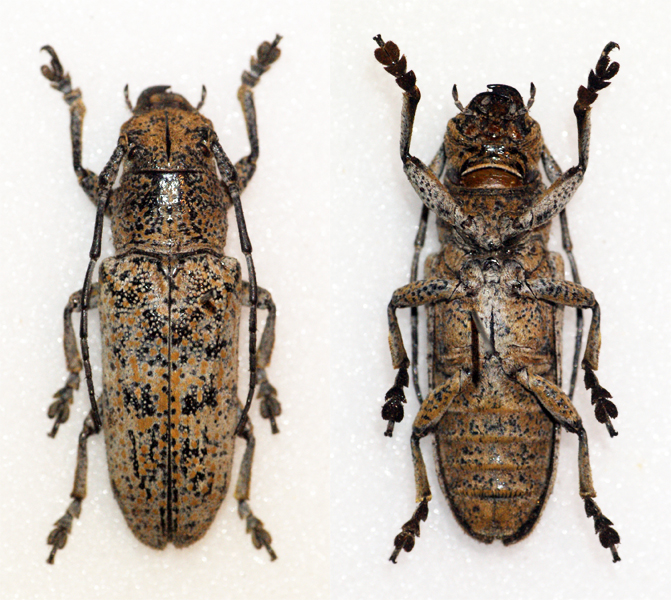

Scientific classification
- Kingdom: Animalia
- Phylum: Arthropoda
- Class: Insecta
- Order: Coleoptera
- Suborder: Polyphaga
- Infraorder: Cucujiformia
- Family: Cerambycidae
- Genus: Callimetopus
- Species: C. variolosus

Binomial name
- Callimetopus variolosus (Schultze, 1920)

Synonyms
- Euclea variolosa Schultze, 1920

= Callimetopus variolosus =

Species of beetle

Callimetopus variolosus is a species of beetle in the family Cerambycidae. It was described by Schultze in 1920, originally under the genus Euclea. It is known from the Philippines.
