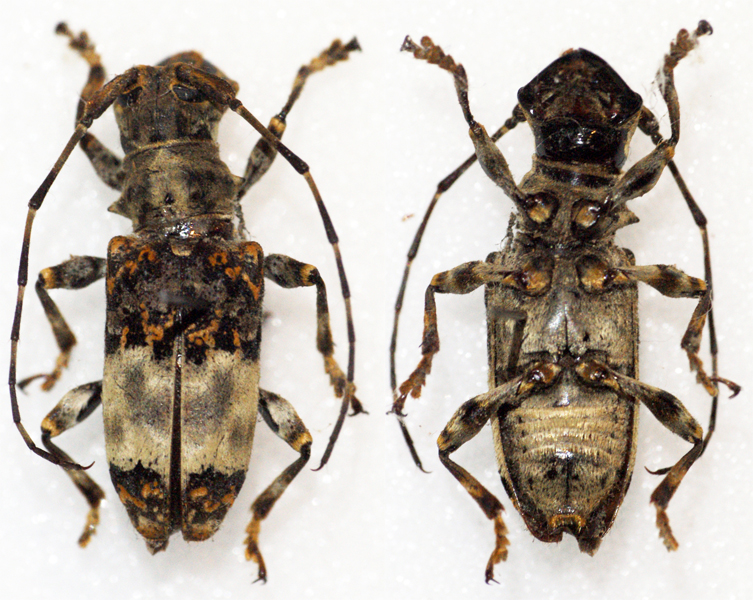

Scientific classification
- Kingdom: Animalia
- Phylum: Arthropoda
- Class: Insecta
- Order: Coleoptera
- Suborder: Polyphaga
- Infraorder: Cucujiformia
- Family: Cerambycidae
- Genus: Abryna
- Species: A. copei

Binomial name
- Abryna copei Vives, 2009

= Abryna copei =

Species of beetle

Abryna copei is a species of beetle in the family Cerambycidae, found in Asia in countries such as Philippines.
