= Abryna rubeta =

Scientific classification
- Kingdom: Animalia
- Phylum: Arthropoda
- Class: Insecta
- Order: Coleoptera
- Suborder: Polyphaga
- Infraorder: Cucujiformia
- Family: Cerambycidae
- Genus: Abryna
- Species: A. rubeta

Binomial name
- Abryna rubeta Pascoe, 1864

Species of beetle

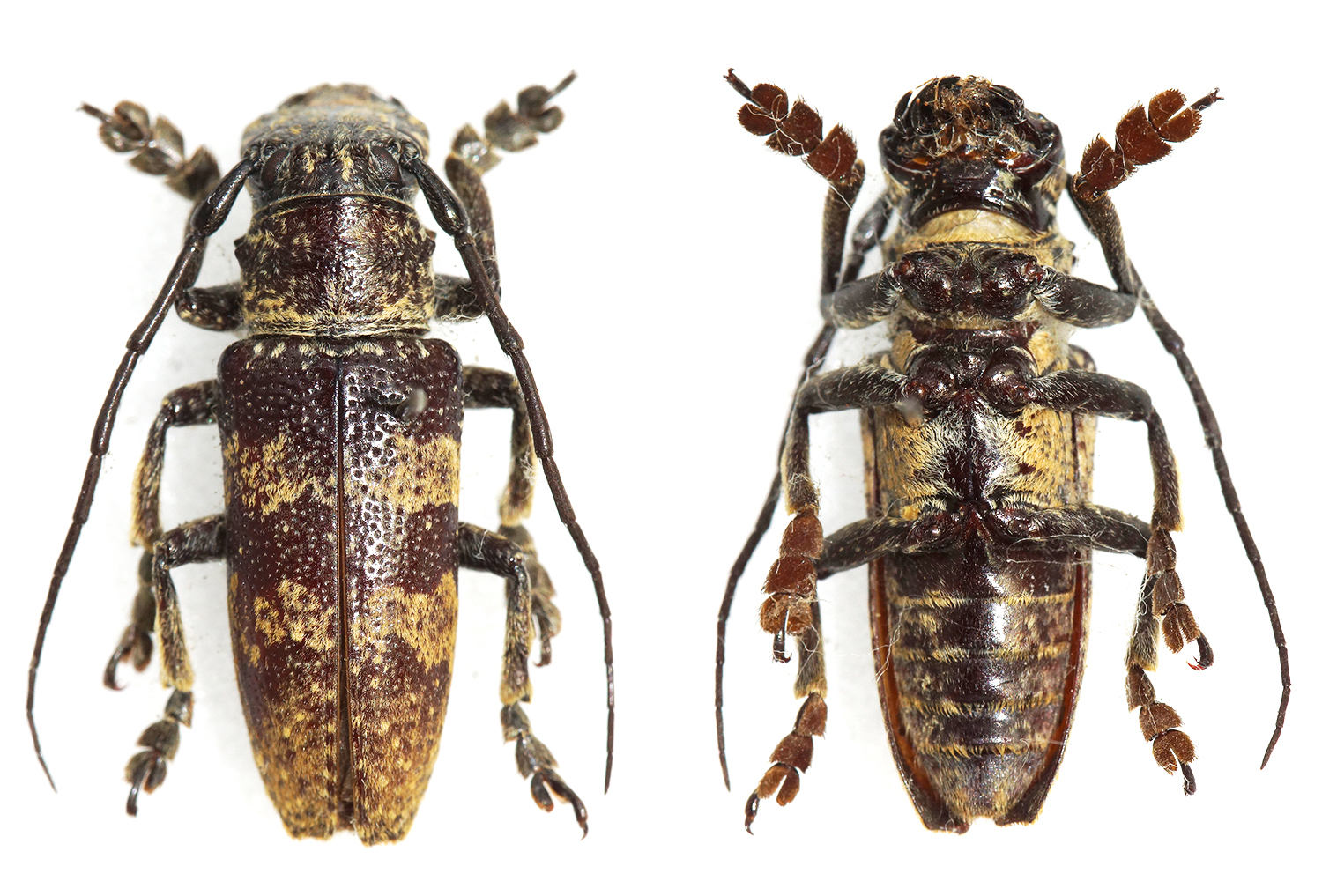

Abryna rubeta is a species of beetle in the family Cerambycidae. It was described by Francis Polkinghorne Pascoe in 1864. It is known from Borneo and Malaysia.
