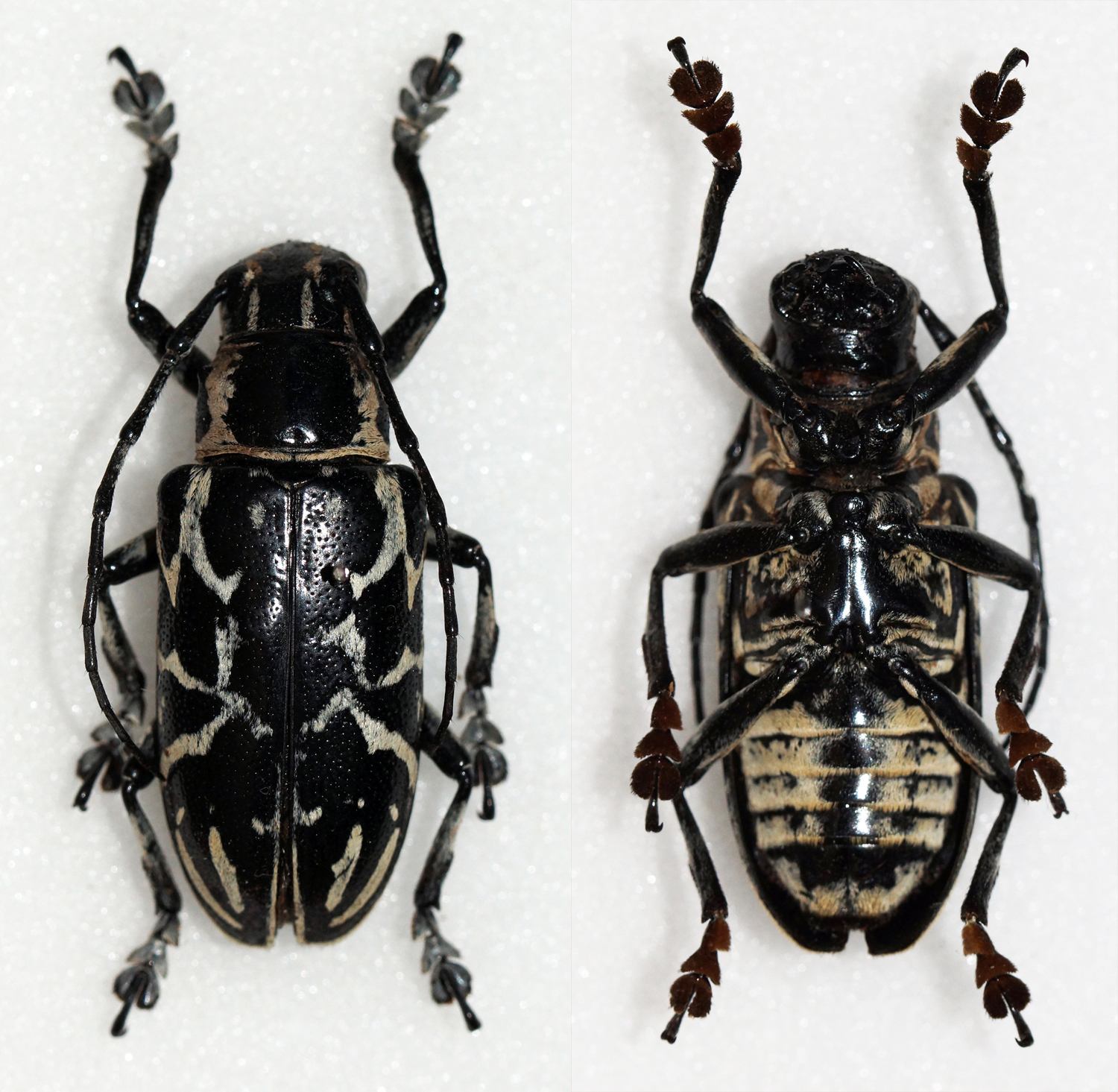
- Faustabryna multifasciata

Scientific classification
- Kingdom: Animalia
- Phylum: Arthropoda
- Class: Insecta
- Order: Coleoptera
- Suborder: Polyphaga
- Infraorder: Cucujiformia
- Family: Cerambycidae
- Genus: Faustabryna
- Species: F. affinis

Binomial name
- Faustabryna affinis (Breuning, 1980)

Synonyms
- Callimetopus affinis Breuning, 1980; Faustabryna multifasciata Vives, 2014

= Faustabryna affinis =

Species of beetle

Faustabryna affinis is a species of beetle in the family Cerambycidae. It was described by Stephan von Breuning in 1980. It is known from the Philippines.
