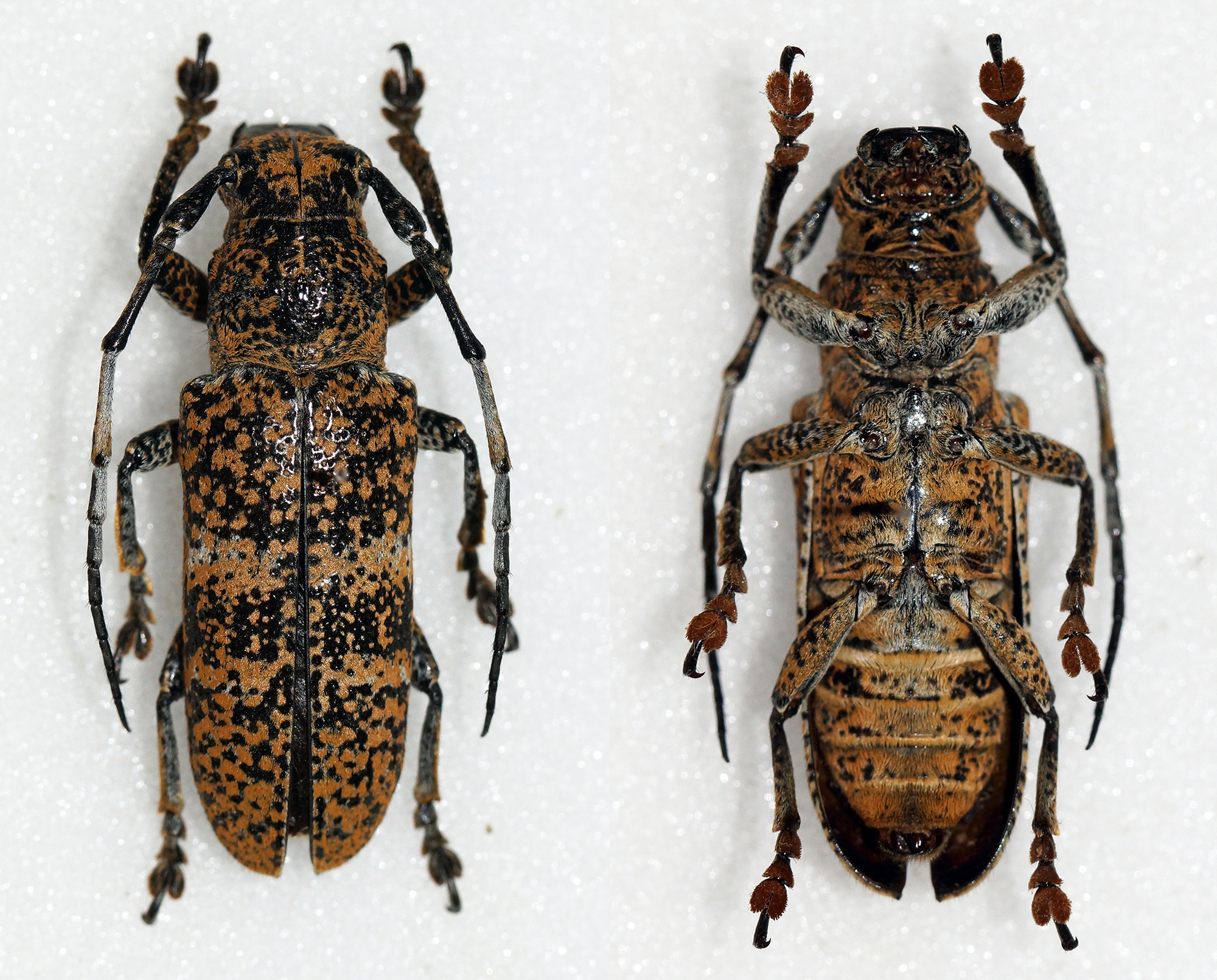

Scientific classification
- Kingdom: Animalia
- Phylum: Arthropoda
- Class: Insecta
- Order: Coleoptera
- Suborder: Polyphaga
- Infraorder: Cucujiformia
- Family: Cerambycidae
- Genus: Callimetopus
- Species: C. ornatus

Binomial name
- Callimetopus ornatus (Schultze, 1934)

Synonyms
- Niphonoclea ornata Schultze, 1934

= Callimetopus ornatus =

Species of beetle

Callimetopus ornatus is a species of beetle in the family Cerambycidae. It was described by Schultze in 1934. It is known from the Philippines.
