= Abryna obscura =

Scientific classification
- Domain: Eukaryota
- Kingdom: Animalia
- Phylum: Arthropoda
- Class: Insecta
- Order: Coleoptera
- Suborder: Polyphaga
- Infraorder: Cucujiformia
- Family: Cerambycidae
- Tribe: Pteropliini
- Genus: Abryna
- Species: A. obscura

Binomial name
- Abryna obscura Schwarzer, 1925

Synonyms
- Abryna coenosa loochooana Matsushita, 1933; Abryna coenosa obscura (Schwarzer) Matsushita, 1933; Abryna subuniformis Pic, 1925

Species of beetle

Abryna obscura is a species of beetle in the family Cerambycidae. It was described by Bernhard Schwarzer in 1925. It is known from Taiwan and Japan.

== Subspecies ==
- Abryna obscura obscura Schwarzer, 1925
- Abryna obscura oshimensis Breuning, 1955
- Abryna obscura uniformis Breuning & Ohbayashi, 1966
