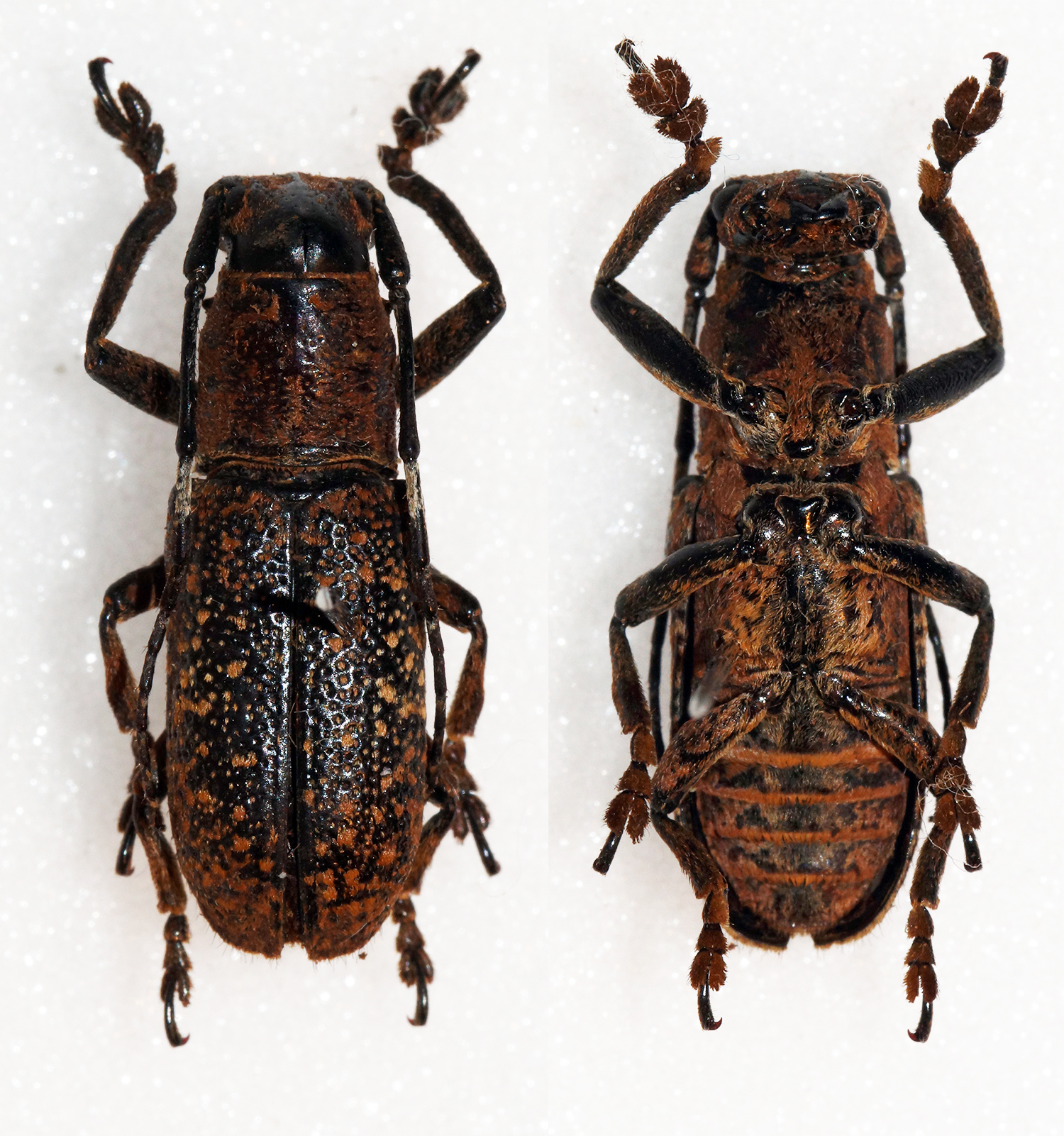

Scientific classification
- Domain: Eukaryota
- Kingdom: Animalia
- Phylum: Arthropoda
- Class: Insecta
- Order: Coleoptera
- Suborder: Polyphaga
- Infraorder: Cucujiformia
- Family: Cerambycidae
- Tribe: Pteropliini
- Genus: Callimetopus
- Species: C. longicollis

Binomial name
- Callimetopus longicollis (Schwarzer, 1931)

= Callimetopus longicollis =

Species of beetle

Callimetopus longicollis is a species of beetle in the family Cerambycidae. It was described by Bernhard Schwarzer in 1931. It is known from the Philippines.
