= Callimetopus ruficollis =

Scientific classification
- Domain: Eukaryota
- Kingdom: Animalia
- Phylum: Arthropoda
- Class: Insecta
- Order: Coleoptera
- Suborder: Polyphaga
- Infraorder: Cucujiformia
- Family: Cerambycidae
- Tribe: Pteropliini
- Genus: Callimetopus
- Species: C. ruficollis

Binomial name
- Callimetopus ruficollis (Heller, 1915)

Synonyms
- Euclea ruficollis Heller, 1915

Species of beetle

Callimetopus ruficollis is a species of beetle in the family Cerambycidae. It was described by Heller in 1915. It is known from the Philippines.
