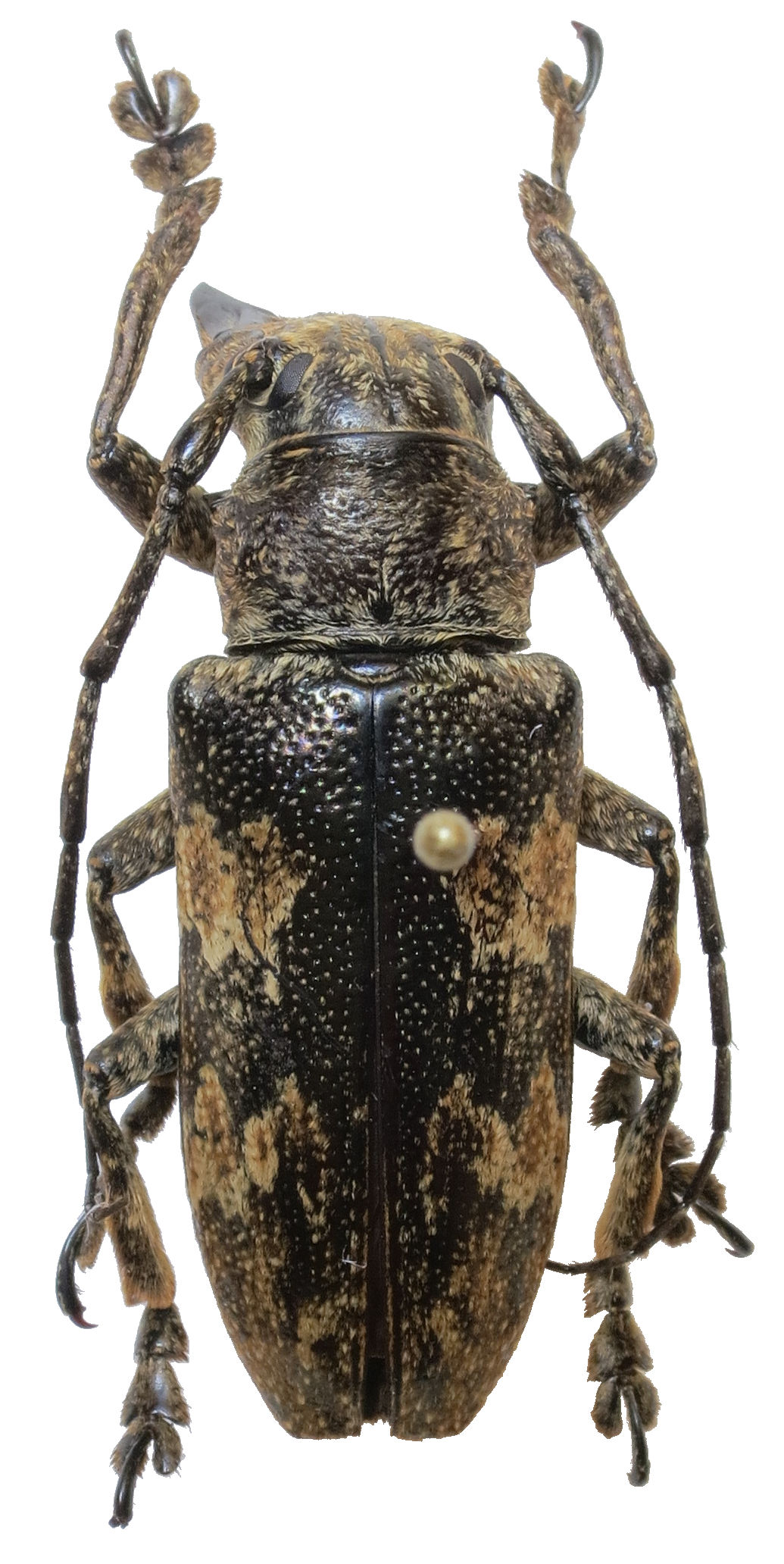
- Abryna coenosa from Philippines

Scientific classification
- Domain: Eukaryota
- Kingdom: Animalia
- Phylum: Arthropoda
- Class: Insecta
- Order: Coleoptera
- Suborder: Polyphaga
- Infraorder: Cucujiformia
- Family: Cerambycidae
- Tribe: Pteropliini
- Genus: Abryna
- Species: A. coenosa

Binomial name
- Abryna coenosa Newman, 1842

= Abryna coenosa =

Species of beetle

Abryna coenosa is a species of beetle in the family Cerambycidae. It was described by Newman in 1842. It is known from Taiwan and the Philippines.

== Subspecies ==
- Abryna coenosa coenosa Newman, 1842
- Abryna coenosa mindanaonis Breuning, 1980
- Abryna coenosa superba Pic, 1932
