= Callimetopus pantherinus =

Scientific classification
- Kingdom: Animalia
- Phylum: Arthropoda
- Class: Insecta
- Order: Coleoptera
- Suborder: Polyphaga
- Infraorder: Cucujiformia
- Family: Cerambycidae
- Genus: Callimetopus
- Species: C. pantherinus

Binomial name
- Callimetopus pantherinus Blanchard, 1855

Synonyms
- Euclea nodicornis Ritsema, 1892

Species of beetle

Callimetopus pantherinus is a species of beetle in the family Cerambycidae. It was described by Émile Blanchard in 1855. It is known from Moluccas.
