= Abryna basalis =

Scientific classification
- Domain: Eukaryota
- Kingdom: Animalia
- Phylum: Arthropoda
- Class: Insecta
- Order: Coleoptera
- Suborder: Polyphaga
- Infraorder: Cucujiformia
- Family: Cerambycidae
- Tribe: Pteropliini
- Genus: Abryna
- Species: A. basalis

Binomial name
- Abryna basalis Aurivillius, 1908

Species of beetle

Abryna basalis is a species of beetle in the family Cerambycidae. It was described by Per Olof Christopher Aurivillius in 1908. It is known from the Solomon Islands.

== Description ==
Abryna basalis has a body length of approximately 15 mm. Its body color is primarily dark brown, complemented by a mix of grayish and yellowish pubescence. The elytra are subcylindrical and short, rounding at the apex. From the base to the apex, the elytra are punctuated and covered with a dense dark brown pubescence, sprinkled with ash-colored spots. Notably, a well-defined whitish band is present at the base between the humeral calli, and a very wavy, barely visible ash-colored line is observed behind the middle. The legs of Abryna Basilis are adorned with whitish bristles.

== Distribution ==
Abryna basalis was identified on Tuilagi Island in the Solomon Islands.
