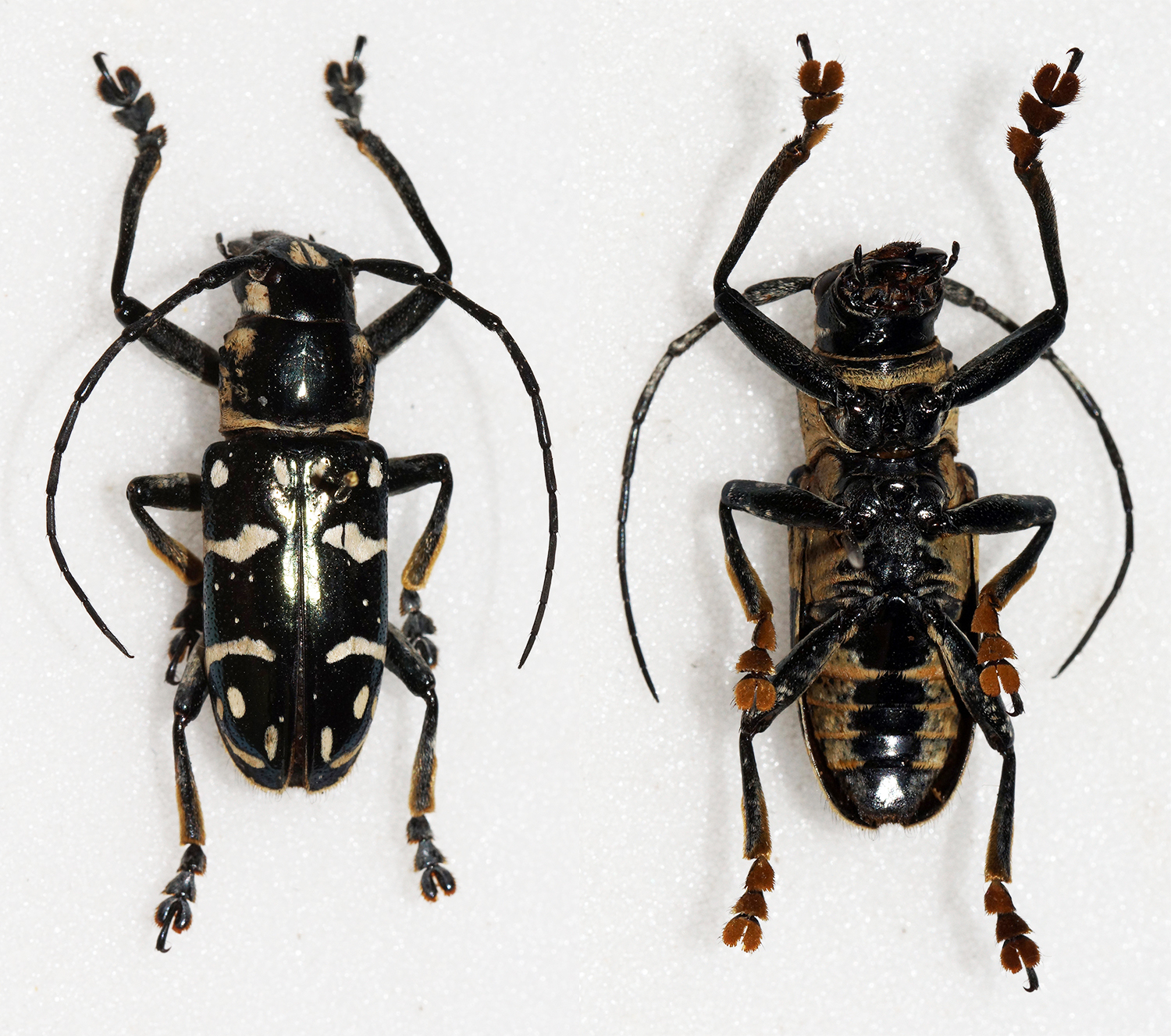

Scientific classification
- Kingdom: Animalia
- Phylum: Arthropoda
- Class: Insecta
- Order: Coleoptera
- Suborder: Polyphaga
- Infraorder: Cucujiformia
- Family: Cerambycidae
- Genus: Faustabryna
- Species: F. mindanaoensis

Binomial name
- Faustabryna mindanaoensis (Breuning, 1980)

Synonyms
- Abryna (Faustabryna) mindanaoensis (Breuning, 1980); Acronia lumawigi Breuning, 1980; Callimetopus mindanaoensis Breuning, 1980; Callimetopus vivesi Breuning, 1981; Faustabryna vivesi (Breuning, 1981)

= Faustabryna mindanaoensis =

Species of beetle

Faustabryna mindanaoensis is a species of beetle in the family Cerambycidae. It was described by Stephan von Breuning in 1980, originally under the genus Callimetopus. It is known from the Philippines.
