= Cape Flats Sand Fynbos =

Vegetation type endemic to the City of Cape Town

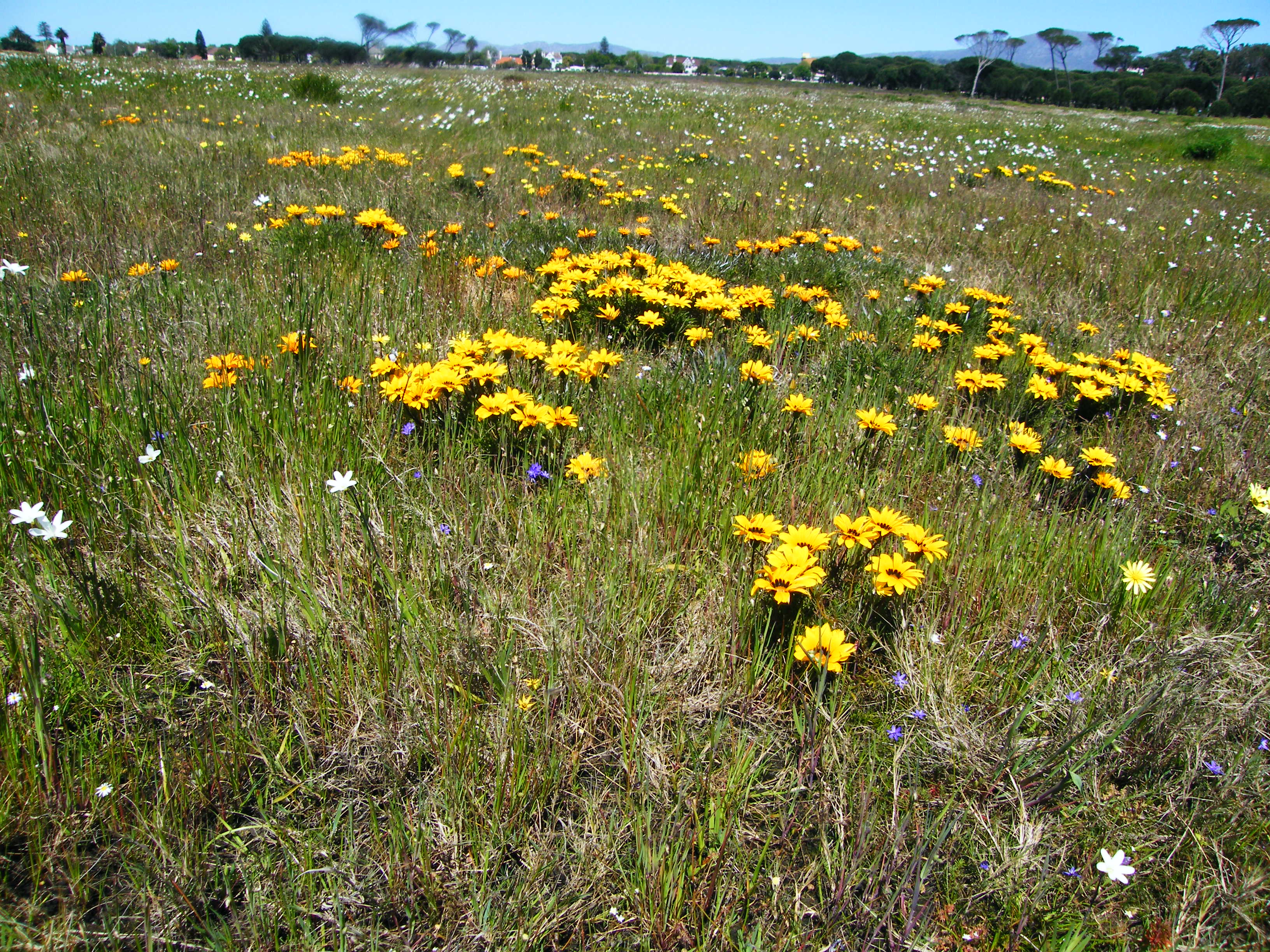
A surviving remnant of Cape Flats Sand Fynbos at Rondebosch Common.

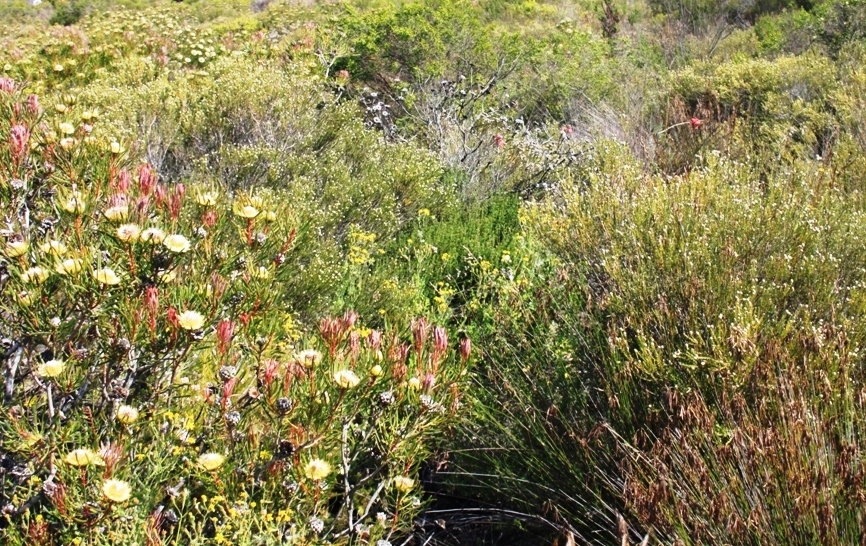
Heath (Erica spp.), cone-bush and restio specimens.

Cape Flats Sand Fynbos (CFSF), previously known as Sand Plain Fynbos, is a critically endangered vegetation type that occurs only within the city of Cape Town. Less than 1% of this unique lowland fynbos vegetation is conserved.

== Description ==
This is the richest and most diverse type of Sand Fynbos. It also has the highest number of threatened plant species. It is the wettest and coolest of all West Coast Sand Fynbos, growing primarily in deep, white, acidic sands. It is dominated by Proteoid and Restioid fynbos, but Ericaceous fynbos also occurs in wetter areas and Asteraceous fynbos in drier spots. In winter, seasonal wetlands appear in many areas, and mists often cover the landscape.

== Threats and conservation ==
Lying as it does entirely within the limits of Cape Town, over 85 percent of what was once Cape Town's commonest vegetation type is now destroyed and covered by urban sprawl. Half of what remains is badly infested with invasive alien plants (Acacia saligna, Acacia cyclops, Pinus, Eucalyptus and Kikuyu grass), and less than 1 percent is actually statutorily conserved.

Surviving pockets exist in several small nature reserves within the city, such as Rondevlei, Kenilworth Racecourse, Rondebosch Common and Tokai Park. These are identified as “Core Conservation Sites”. However, these sites alone are too small to preserve this vegetation type, and they themselves are threatened by invasive alien plants and the destructive practise of mowing (which eliminates all the tall and serotinous species).

Habitat preserves

Nature preserves with Cape Flats Sand Fynbos habitat include:

- Blaauwberg Conservation Area
- Edith Stephens Wetland Park
- Greater Princess Vlei Conservation Area
- Kenilworth Racecourse Conservation Area
- Macassar Dunes Conservation Area
- Milnerton Racecourse Nature Reserve
- Rondebosch Common
- Rondevlei Nature Reserve
- Tokai Park (Table Mountain National Park)
- Witzands Aquifer Conservation Area
- Wolfgat Nature Reserve
- Zandvlei Estuary Nature Reserve
- Westridge Gardens

Historically, areas of Cape Town that were not developed for housing were often planted with commercial plantations of invasive European Pines. A fire at Tokai Park in 1998 revealed that this pine plantation is located on top of intact CFSF seed beds from its original vegetation. To date over 340 indigenous plants have emerged from the seed bank, and 22 threatened plant species and 2 threatened amphibian species are present.

Cape Flats Sand Fynbos is particularly rich in Protea and Erica species, many of which are endemic to this vegetation type and occur nowhere else. This was also the habitat of several species of plant which are now extinct, such as the Aspalathus variegata (the Cape Flats Capegorse), Erica pyramidalis (the Pyramid Heath), Erica turgida (the Showy Heath), Erica verticillata (the Whorl Heath) and Liparia graminifolia (Grass Mountainpea).

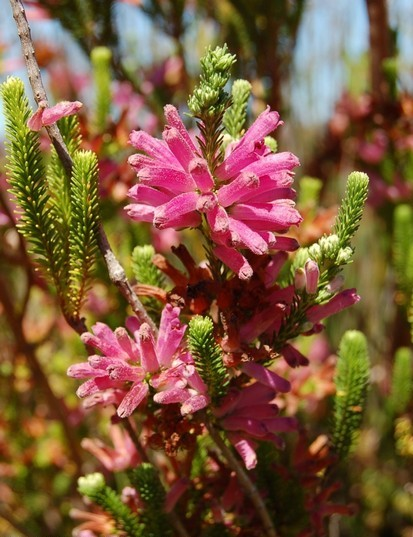
Erica verticillata is completely endemic to Cape Flats Sand Fynbos. However, it is now classed as extinct in the wild.

== Endemic flora ==
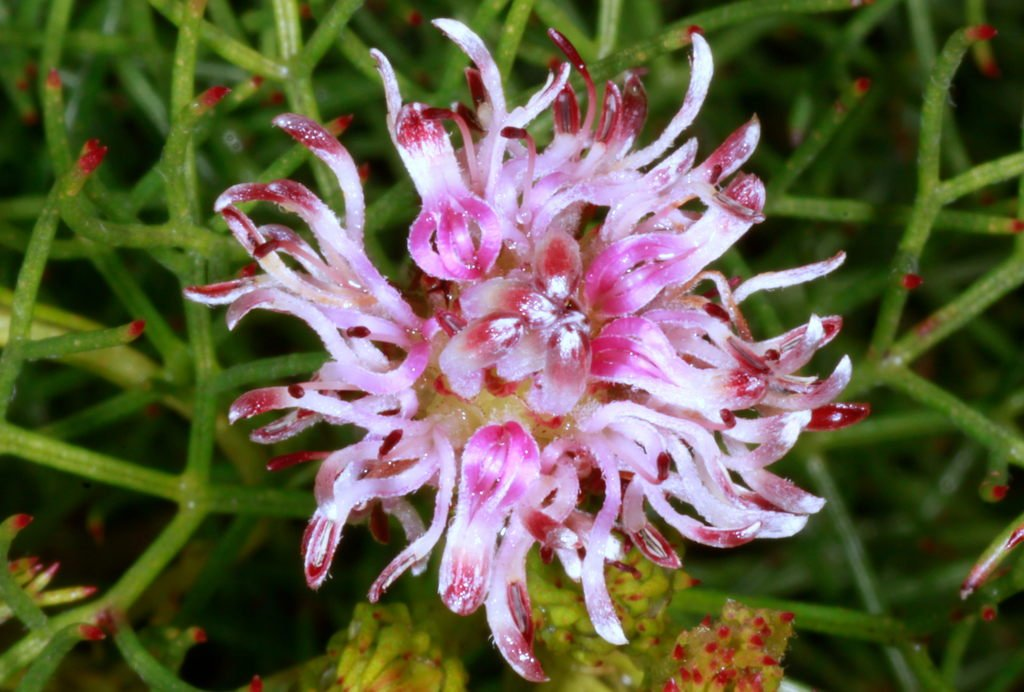
The Strawberry Spider head (Serruria aemula) is a critically endangered within the Cape Flats Sand Fynbos ecosystem.

Some plant species that are endemic to this vegetation type include:

- Aspalathus variegata (The Cape Flats Gorse. Probably extinct)
- Athanasia capitata
- Cliffortia ericifolia
- Erica margaritacea
- Erica pyramidalis (extinct)
- Erica turgida (extinct in the wild)
- Erica verticillata (extinct in the wild)
- Ixia versicolor
- Lampranthus stenus
- Leucadendron levisanus
- Liparia graminifolia (probably extinct)
- Serruria aemula (The Strawberry Spiderhead. Critically endangered)
- Serruria foeniculacea
- Serruria furcellata
- Tetraria variabilis
- Trianoptiles solitaria

== See also ==
- Atlantis Sand Fynbos – Vegetation type from north of Cape Town, in the Western Cape, South Africa
- Biodiversity of Cape Town – Diversity of the natural environment of Cape Town
- Cape Flats Dune Strandveld – Endangered vegetation type endemic to the coastal areas around Cape Town
- Cape Lowland Freshwater Wetland – Vegetation type endemic to the Western Cape, South Africa
- Hangklip Sand Fynbos – Vegetation type endemic to the southern coastal portion of the Western Cape, South Africa
- List of nature reserves in Cape Town
- Index: Fynbos - habitats and species.
