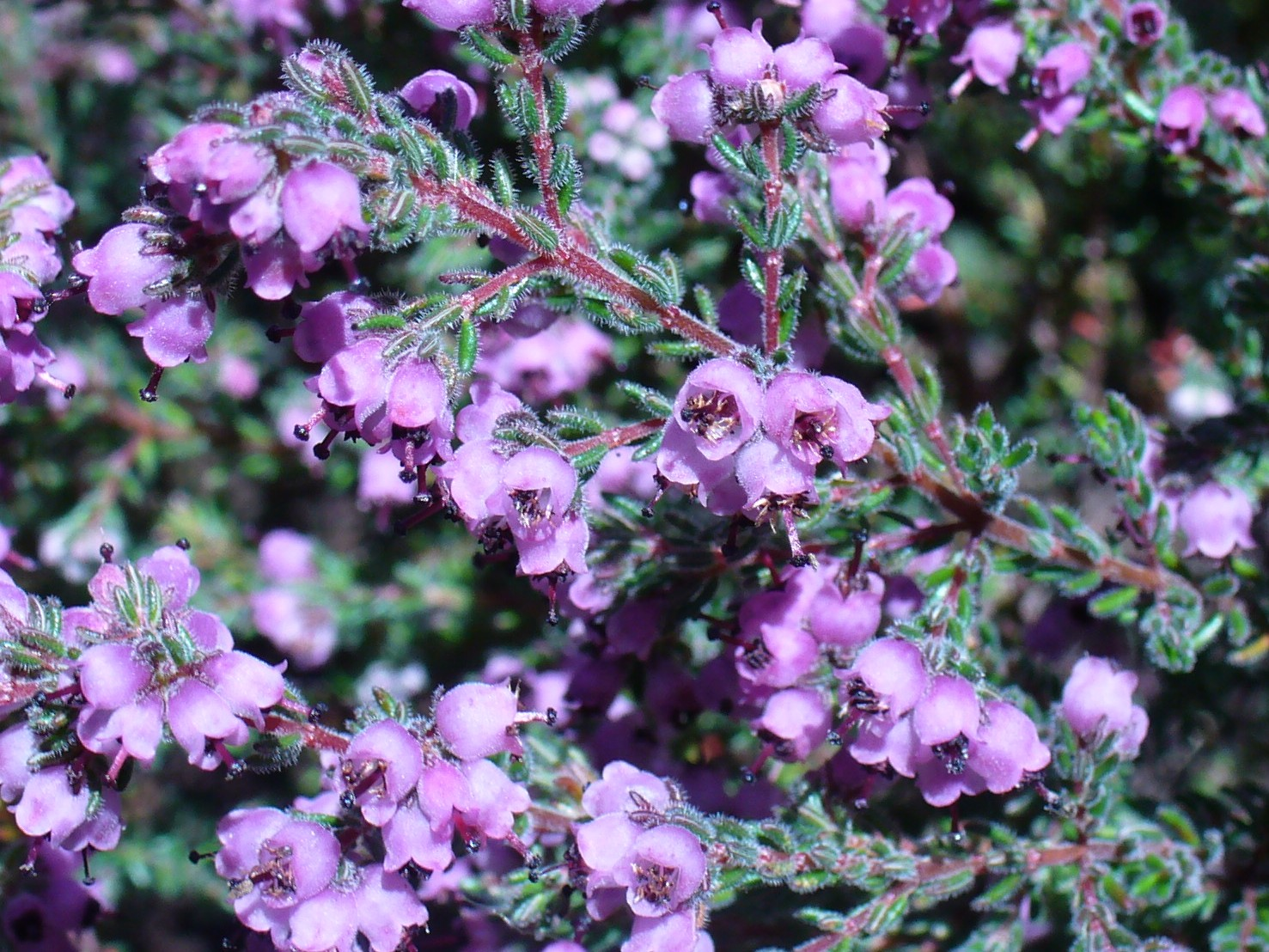

Scientific classification
- Kingdom: Plantae
- Clade: Tracheophytes
- Clade: Angiosperms
- Clade: Eudicots
- Clade: Asterids
- Order: Ericales
- Family: Ericaceae
- Genus: Erica
- Species: E. turgida

Binomial name
- Erica turgida Salisb.

= Erica turgida =

Species of flowering plant

Erica turgida, the showy heath or Kenilworth heath, is a species of Erica that was naturally restricted to the city of Cape Town, South Africa, but is now classified as Extinct in the Wild.

This small, delicate erica produces thin, willowy stems, covered in velvety hair. It produces masses of bright-pink, cup-shaped flowers.

This Erica used to grow naturally in the area that is now beneath the Cape Town suburbs of Rondebosch, Kenilworth and Wynberg. It was therefore an endemic to the critically endangered Cape Flats Sand Fynbos vegetation type. Soon before the last wild population died out at Kenilworth Racecourse Conservation Area, a woman named Elsie Esterhuizen took cuttings to Kirstenbosch gardens and thus saved the species from permanent extinction.

Along with its fellow extinct-in-the-wild heath, Erica verticillata, it is now being re-introduced to the Kenilworth Racecourse Conservation Area, now that the spread of the invasive alien vegetation there has been controlled.

== Gallery ==
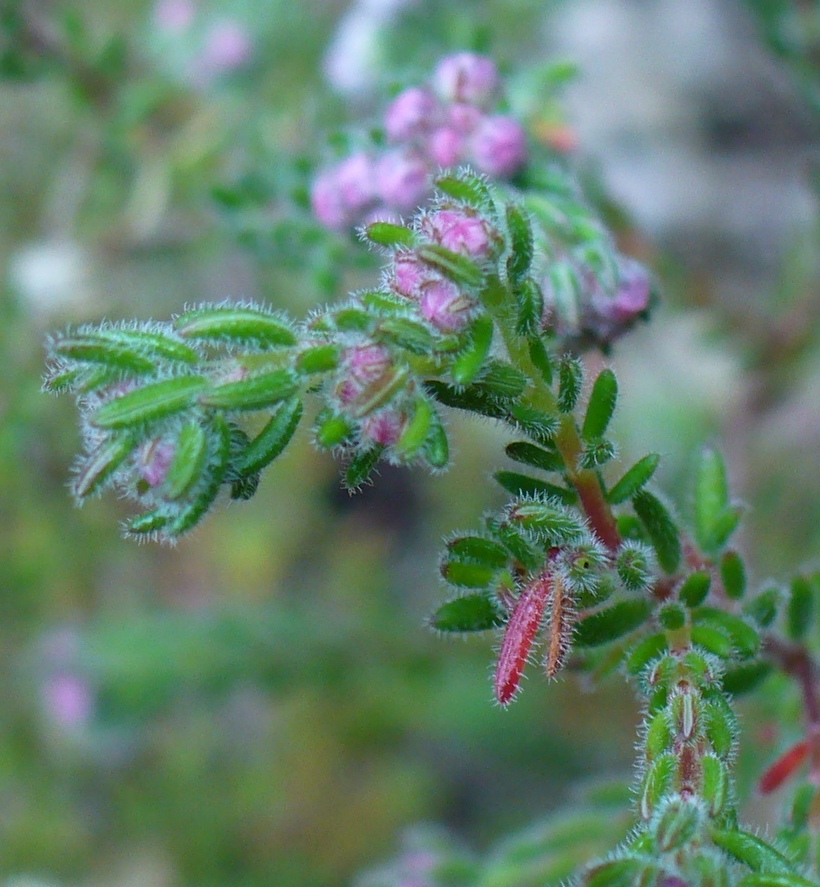

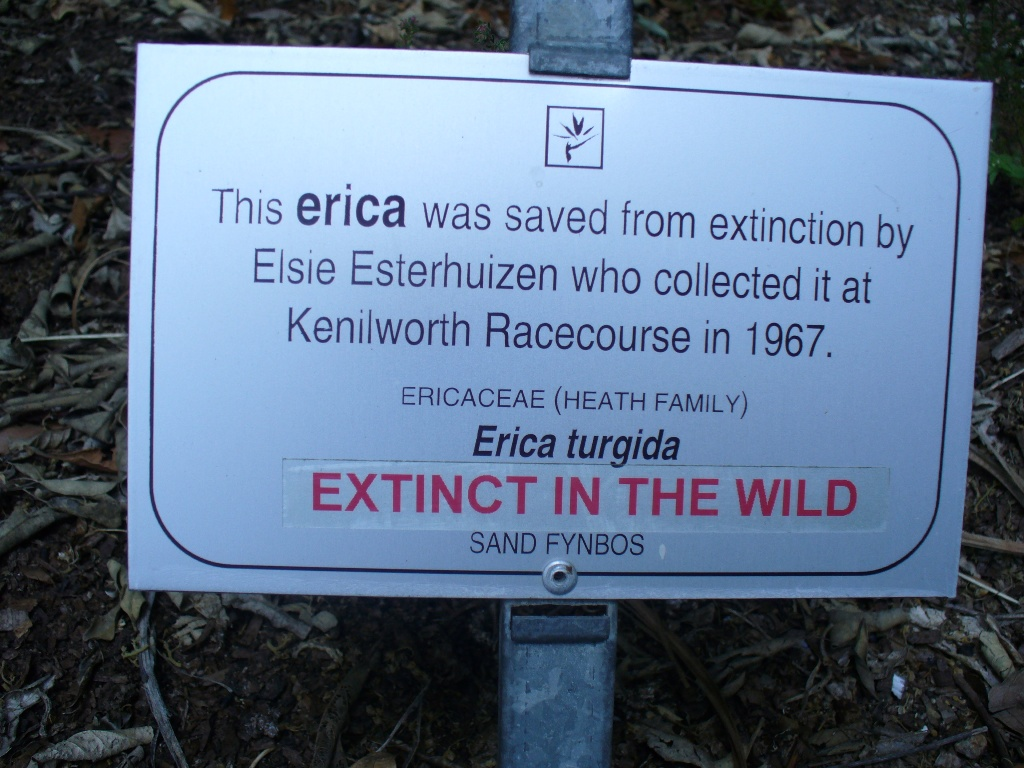
