= Grassy Park =

- Interactive map of Grassy Park
- Coordinates: 34°03′S 18°29′E
- Country: South Africa
- Province: Western Cape
- Municipality: City of Cape Town
- Main Place: Grassy Park

Government
  - Councillor: Donovan Nelson (Ward 65) (DA); Shannen Rossouw (Ward 110) (DA); Gerry Gordon (Ward 67) (DA); William Akim (Ward 66) (DA)

Area
  - Total: 3.24 km^{2} (1.25 sq mi)

Population (2011)
  - Total: 19,212
  - Density: 5,930/km^{2} (15,400/sq mi)

Racial makeup (2011)
  - Black African: 7.7%
  - Coloured: 88.0%
  - Indian/Asian: 1.9%
  - White: 0.3%
  - Other: 2.2%

First languages (2011)
  - English: 75.2%
  - Afrikaans: 21.8%
  - Other: 3.0%
- Time zone: UTC+2 (SAST)
- Postal code (street): 7888
- PO box: 7941

Grassy Park is a suburb of the City of Cape Town in the Western Cape Province of South Africa.

It is bordered to the east by the suburb of Lotus River, to the north by the suburb of Parkwood and to the west by a small lake called Princess Vlei. To the south lies Rondevlei and Zeekoevlei. The Rondevlei Nature Reserve is home to a very shy hippopotamus, a few eland and other mostly nocturnal animals including many caracal and porcupine. Rondevlei is also home to a healthy pelican community. Zeekoevlei is one of the many freshwater lakes in the district.

== History ==
Grassy Park began to develop in the early 1900s on part of the Montagu's Gift estate north of Zeekoevlei. At that time, the area was rural, under the administration of the Divisional Council of the Cape.

Grassy Park EC Primary School (Formerly known as the All Saints Mission School, Zeekoevlei) was opened by Mr. Frederick Kannemeyer on the 13th February 1912 with one teacher and twenty three learners. At the time, the school was the only place of learning on the Cape Flats.

By 1920, the estate had 2000 residents. From 1923, it was represented on the Southern Civic Association.

Grassy Park was proclaimed a local area in 1935, which meant that the residents received municipal services, for which they paid higher rates. It was later incorporated into the South Peninsula Municipality in 1996, and into the City of Cape Town in 2000.

== Education ==
Grassy park is home to four Primary schools and two Secondary schools:

- Grassy Park E.C. Primary School
- Fairview Primary School
- Kannemeyer Primary School
- Sid G. Rule Primary
- Grassy Park High School
- Grassdale High School.

== Religion ==
There are several places of worship in Grassy Park. These include:

- Acts Mission Church of SA
- Assembly Of God
- Calvyn Protestant Church Grassy Park
- Gereformeerde Kerk - Grassy Park
- Grassy Park Methodist Church
- Grassy Park Moravian Church
- Masjid Ahmediyah (Grassy Park Mosque)
- Grassy Park Baptist Church
- Grassy Park Seventh-day Adventist Church
- Church Of The Good Shepherd
- New Apostolic Church Grassy Park
- New Apostolic Church Grassy Park Central
- New Apostolic Church Grassy Park West
- Old Apostolic Church
- Our Lady Queen of Peace Catholic Church
- Trinity African Methodist Episcopal Church Grassy Park

== Sports and recreation ==
The Rooikrans Sports Ground in Grassy Park has playing fields for a variety of sports such as baseball, cricket, rugby and soccer. There are several sports teams based here. These include Grassy Park Crusaders Baseball Club, Grassy Park United Football Club, Titans RFC (Rugby-Football Club). The Grassy Park Chess Academy is a chess club based in Grassy Park.

== Commercial areas and community facilities ==
Grassy Park's main commercial area is an intersection called "Busy Corner" at the intersection of 5th Avenue and Victoria Road. There is a hub of small retail outlets, the local Library, Police Station and a transport interchange which connects Grassy Park to Mitchell's Plain, Retreat and Wynberg. Another commercial area is at the corner of Prince George Drive and 5th Avenue where supermarkets, fast food restaurants and a petrol station can be found. Various small shops and businesses can also be found along Lake Road.

Grassy Park is also home to the Cape of Good Hope SPCA and LOFOB. Other public amenities in Grassy Park include the Grassy Park Community Health Clinic, Grassy Park Civic Centre and Battswood Art Centre.
