= Tokai Park =

Park in Cape Town, South Africa

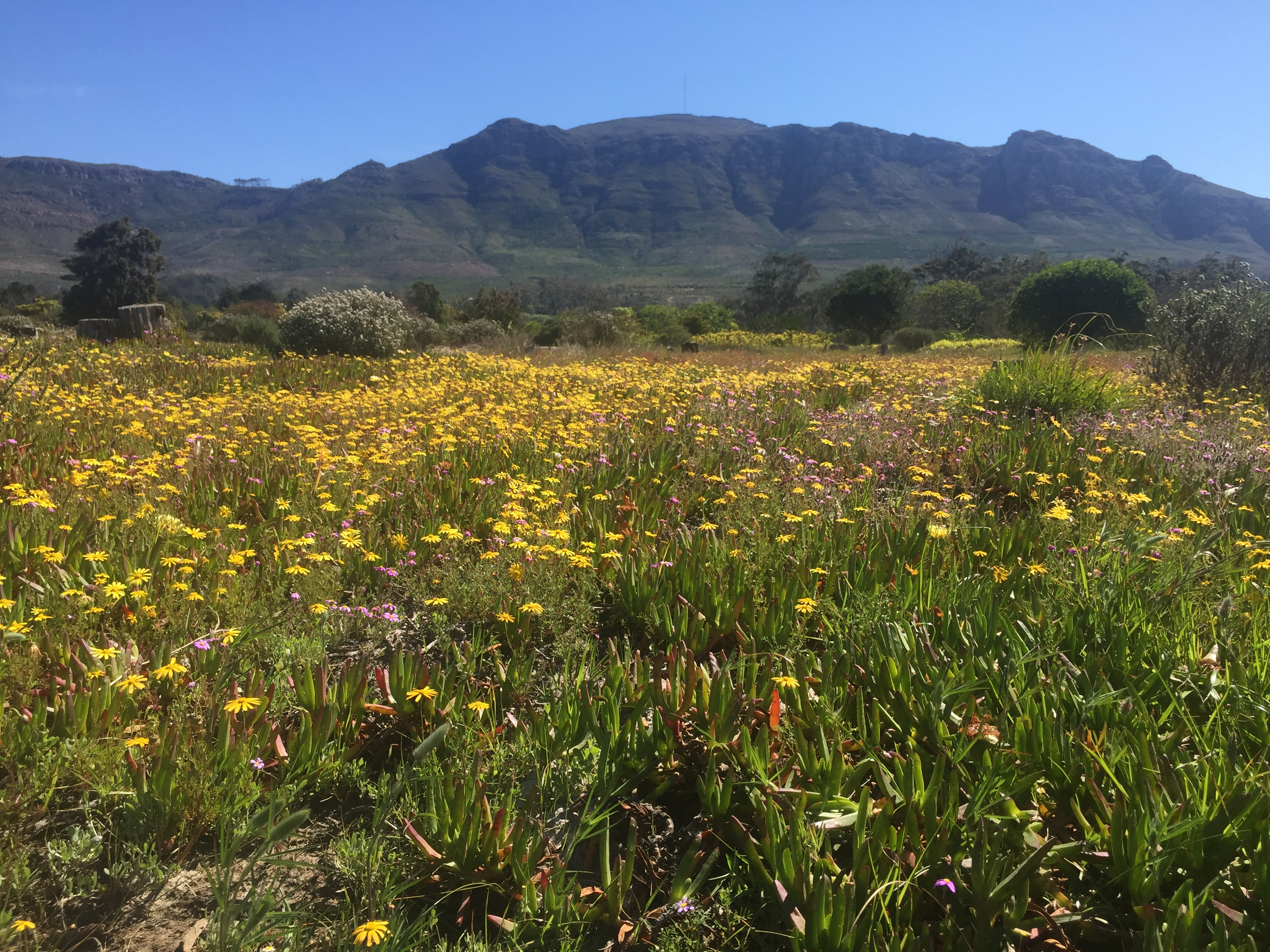
- View from lower to upper Tokai Park, with the Constantiaberg Mountain in the background
- Interactive map of Tokai Park
- Location: Cape Town, South Africa
- Coordinates: 34°03′17″S 18°25′55″E
- Area: 483 acres (195 ha).
- Governing body: South African National Parks
- Website: tokaipark.com

Tokai Park, previously known as "Tokai Forest", is a small wing, about 600 ha, of the greater Table Mountain National Park in Cape Town, South Africa. The park consists of two sections, upper and lower Tokai Park. Lower Tokai Park is flat, and characterized by the threatened Cape Flats Sand Fynbos. Upper Tokai Park is on the slopes of Constantiaberg Mountain, and consists of conservation area, as well as the Tokai Arboretum. Upper Tokai Park is characterized by Peninsula Granite Fynbos, Peninsula Sandstone Fynbos and Afromontane Forest and noted for its diversity.

Until recently, most of Tokai Park was under plantation. However the lease of Tokai Park by MTO Forestry expires in 2025, and the removal of the last of the commercial plantations has been followed by restoration efforts by South African National Parks and other conservation organisations.

Today, Tokai Park has over 110 plant species threatened with extinction or extinct in the wild and restored at Tokai. Perhaps the best known example of a species that is extinct in the wild, but which is recovering at Tokai Park is Erica verticillata. More than 350 plant species have already naturally returned. There are now over 440 recorded plant species at Lower Tokai Park according to a species list compiled by scientists. According to William Frederick Purcell's list, there may be over 500 plant species expected.

Tokai Park is also a popular recreational area, with walking trails, horse-riding and cycling trails as well as a picnic area. Whilst recreation is regarded by all as an important ecosystem service provided by this park, there has been much contention over shaded walk-ways, with scientists maintaining that shaded recreation is not compatible with Fynbos restoration, and a group of the public who wish to retain the plantations for shaded recreation.

== A brief history of Tokai Park ==
From 1905 to 1919, William Frederick Purcell created a species list for Bergvliet/Tokai, which is the only source of information on the plant species that used to occur in Cape Flats Sand Fynbos. Around the same time, plantations were established at Tokai Park. Much of Tokai Park has been covered by pine plantations for over a century and subjected to three harvesting cycles.

Tokai is thought to have been the starting point of Forestry in South Africa. Its most important contribution was arguably the attempted Forestry School (1906-1911). Its failure led to a local training college for foresters in 1912, which was transferred to Saasveld in 1932

During the 20th century Tokai plantation was used for the provision of wood during the two World Wars. Forestry eventually allowed the plantations to be used for dog-waking, opening up the area as an exclusive "white recreation area" during apartheid. Post apartheid, the park was eventually ceded to the World Heritage Site: Table Mountain National Park, and it came under the management of South African National Parks. It is now open to the public as a conservation area.

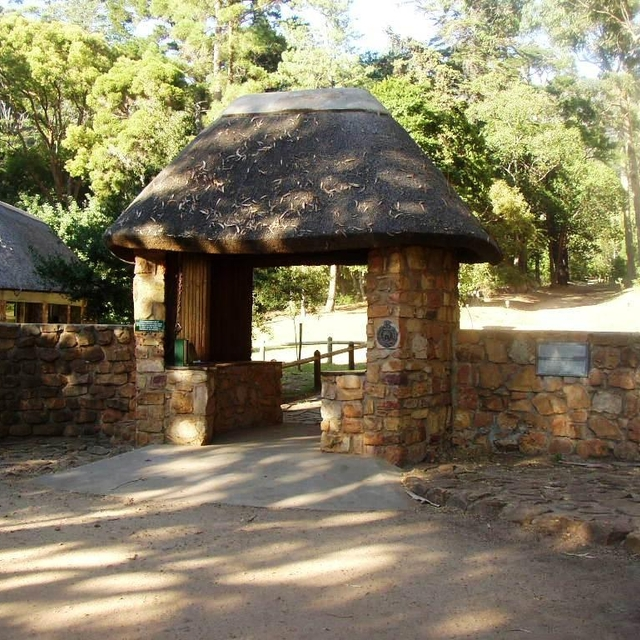
Tokai Arboretum, Tokai Park

=== Tokai Arboretum ===
The main section of the Tokai Arboretum at Upper Tokai Park is 14 ha in size, with adjacent compartments resulting in a combined 26 ha. In 1884, Joseph Storr Lister planted Monterey Pines in the first attempt at commercial afforestation at Tokai. Two years later (1886) an arboretum was established adjoining the nursery at Tokai. Over 150 species were established, some indigenous and some nationally indigenous, but mostly exotic species.

In August 1985 -its 100th anniversary- Tokai Arboretum was declared a National Monument. In the 1990s there was an attempt to establish a 'Gondwana Garden" to showcase species typical of Gondwana. Many of these species were present at the Cape 60 million years ago. However this was not a success as the plantings were shaded out by the established trees, therefore the project was abandoned. There are currently about 900 plants from 300 species recorded in the main Arboretum.

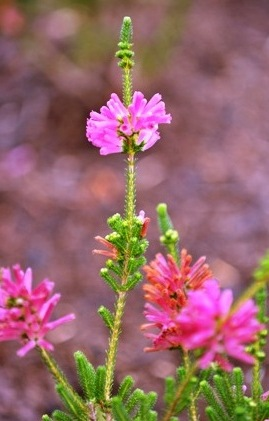
Erica verticillata: extinct in the wild, being reintroduced at Tokai Park

== The Conservation Significance of Tokai Park ==
Mediterranean ecosystems are sites of both high biodiversity and high biodiversity loss. Tokai Park is unusually rich and stands out amongst its counterparts making it a significant conservation area for the City of Cape Town and a site of global interest.

Tokai is part of the Cape Peninsula centre of endemism of the Cape Floristic Region. With over 9000 species of plants the Cape Flora is by far the richest temperate flora on earth, earning itself the status of one of the 6 Floral Kingdoms on earth. Thus this tiny area has half of all the plant species in South Africa, and 20% of the flora of Africa.

With over 2500 indigenous plant species the Peninsula is exceptionally rich even by Cape Floral standards. By comparison, the United Kingdom has 1200 species of plants, the Kruger National Park has about 1980 species and Namibia has 3960 species. Additionally there are very few cities on earth with 150 plant species threatened with extinction, let alone in a single vegetation type within their borders (Cape Flats Sand Fynbos).

Despite having a remarkable species richness within a small area, Tokai Park is adjacent to a large conservation area, the World Heritage Site Table Mountain National Park (SANParks), and thus is not an isolated fragment and avoids associated management problems. In other words, the area is large enough to maintain minimum viable populations of plant species, making it ecologically viable.

== Geology of Tokai Park ==
Three main geological types occur within Tokai Park. The steeper slopes and cliffs of Constantiaberg are Peninsula Formation Sandstone of the Cape Supergroup, covered with plant communities belonging to Peninsula Sandstone Fynbos. The midslopes comprise deep, fertile, loamy soils, derived from the older Cape Suite granites, which support Peninsula Granite Fynbos plant communities, but which have been converted elsewhere on the Peninsula to vineyards and leaf urban suburbs. These granites also underlie the lower Tokai park, but these are covered by Tertiary sands. These nutrient-poor, acidic sands reach thicknesses of tens of meters, and support the highly threatened Cape Flats Sand Fynbos. The upper edge of the sands expose silcrete/ferricrete deposits, which have been mined in the past.

== Vegetation of Tokai Park ==
Tokai Park has four national vegetation types present, including: Cape Flats Sand Fynbos, Peninsula Granite Fynbos, Peninsula Sandstone Fynbos and some small patches of Afromontane Forest. Tokai Park is also the location of historical and cultural heritage, such as the Tokai Arboretum.

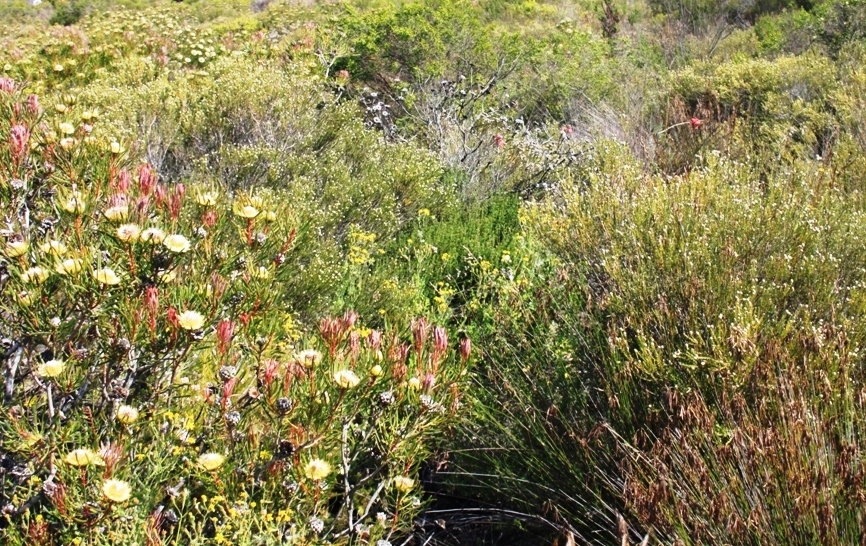
Cape Flats Sand Fynbos

=== Cape Flats Sand Fynbos ===
Cape Flats Sand Fynbos is the most threatened vegetation type at Tokai. Only 10% of this veld type is left. Less than 1% is conserved at present, making Tokai the most important nature reserve for this veld type. The veld type currently contains 108 IUCN Red List species (92 threatened with extinction, 4 already extinct, and 12 other species of conservation concern). It thus qualifies nationally as Critically Endangered, both on account of its destruction and its high numbers of threatened species.

The sudden change in status of Tokai is not due to anything at Tokai itself, it is due to the rapid loss of Cape Flats Sand Fynbos elsewhere in Cape Town. Projections of urban growth predict that unless something is urgently done, all remaining veld will be lost by 2020, leaving Tokai as the biggest reserve of this veld type.

The City of Cape Town has targeted the Blouberg area as a priority conservation area to try and save a representative portion of this veld type. This is a dry region (rainfall 410 mm per year) - Tokai represents the wettest examples of this veld type, with almost double (190%) the average rainfall for this veld type. There are 2 IUCN Red Data List frog species on site.

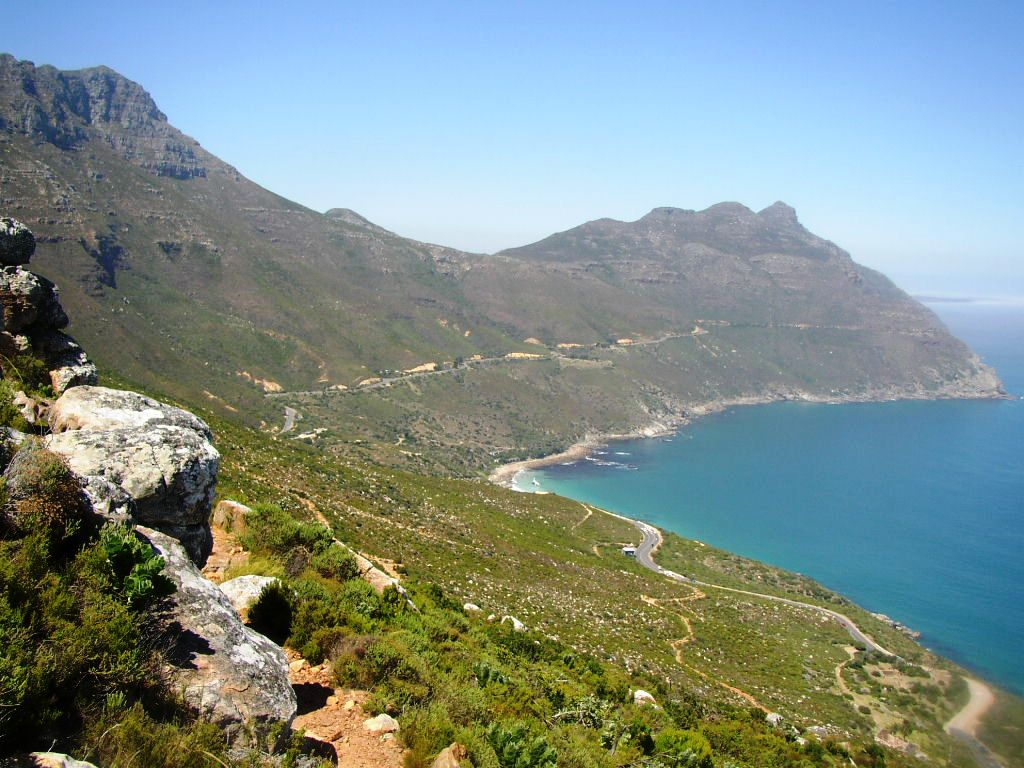
Peninsula Granite Fynbos on Chapmans Peak

=== Peninsula Granite Fynbos ===
Peninsula Granite Fynbos, occurs at the base of the mountain. It forms the roots and foundation for the sandstone, and benefits from the moisture caught by the sandstone ramparts. It is a relatively fertile soil, and consequently the vineyards and most expensive real estate in the city occurs on what used to be Granite Fynbos. Because of its high carrying capacity, this is where the large herds of game, predators, and baboons used to occur historically in the southern Peninsula.

Silver Tree groves, lush riverine corridors and fertile, well-watered soils are in especial short supply along the west coast, and Constantia was one of the first farms developed by Europeans. About one-third remains, and much that does is poorly managed, because of safety and fire concerns. Some 24 IUCN Red List species occur, and 9 species are endemic or near-endemic to the type. It is now classified as Critically Endangered, with 43% remaining; and only 30% conserved.

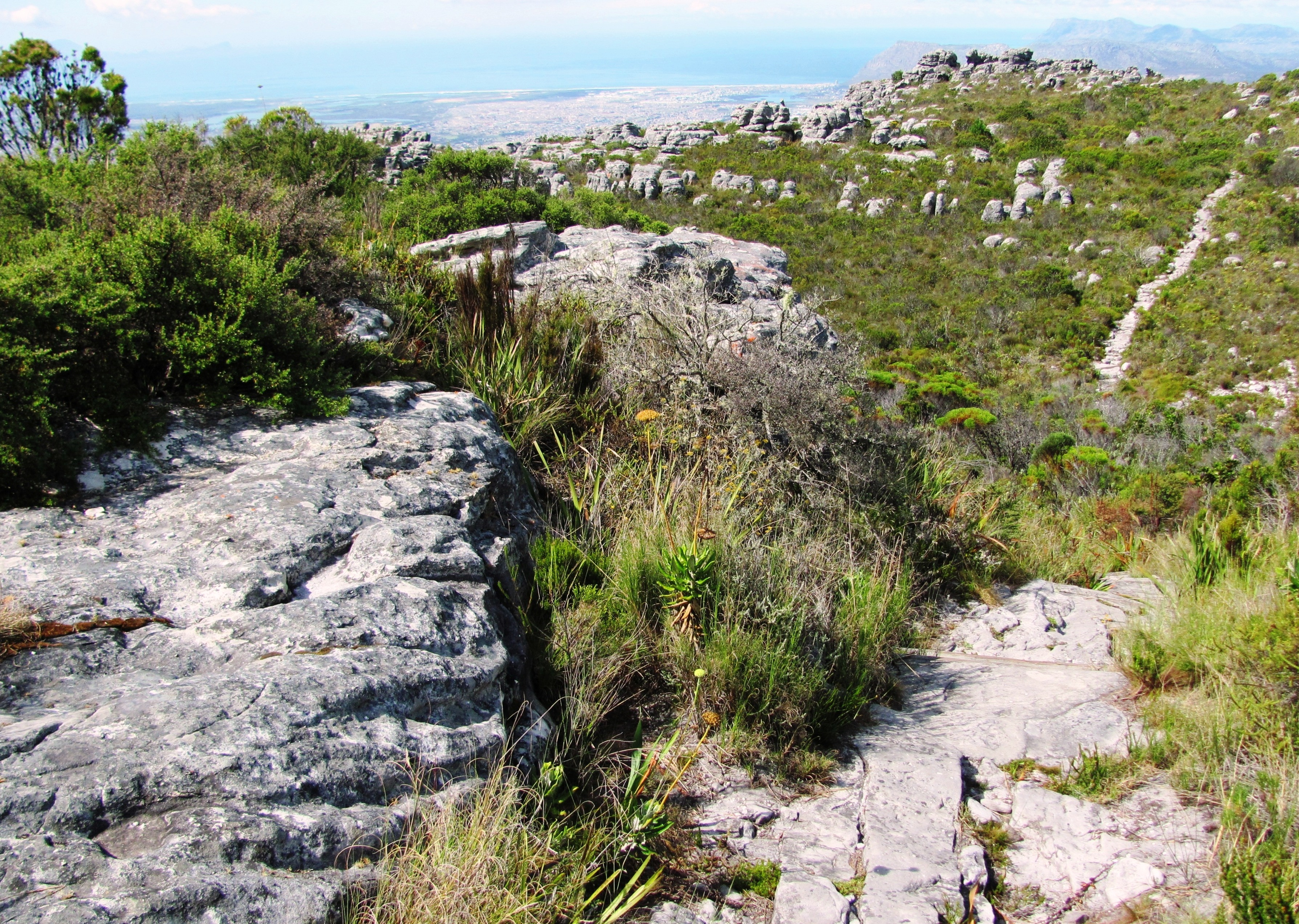
Peninsula Sandstone Fynbos

=== Peninsula Sandstone Fynbos ===
Peninsula Sandstone Fynbos occurs on the uppermost slopes of Constantiaberg and Vlakkenberg. It is confined to the sandstone geology, which weathers to a coarse sand. The soil is exceptionally poor in nutrients and the carrying capacity for supporting animals is very low. Animals do occur, but at extremely low densities.

The most common vertebrates are sunbirds and sugarbirds, subsidized by nectar provided by plants. But in terms of plants this veld type is extremely rich: based solely on the large number (64) of threatened species, this veld type is classified as Endangered.

Some 140 species of plant are categorized as endemic to this vegetation type – they occur nowhere else on earth. This high richness can be explained by the topography (greater relief means more habitats), the proximity to the sea (which limits the variation in climate, so that species occur in narrower zones on the mountain, thus packing more communities and species into the same altitudinal range), and the long isolation of the Peninsula mountains from the other mountains (so that fewer species are shared with neighbouring mountains at Kogelberg, Hottentots Holland and Piketberg, resulting in more unique species). This vegetation type is well conserved: 97% remains; with 90% conserved.

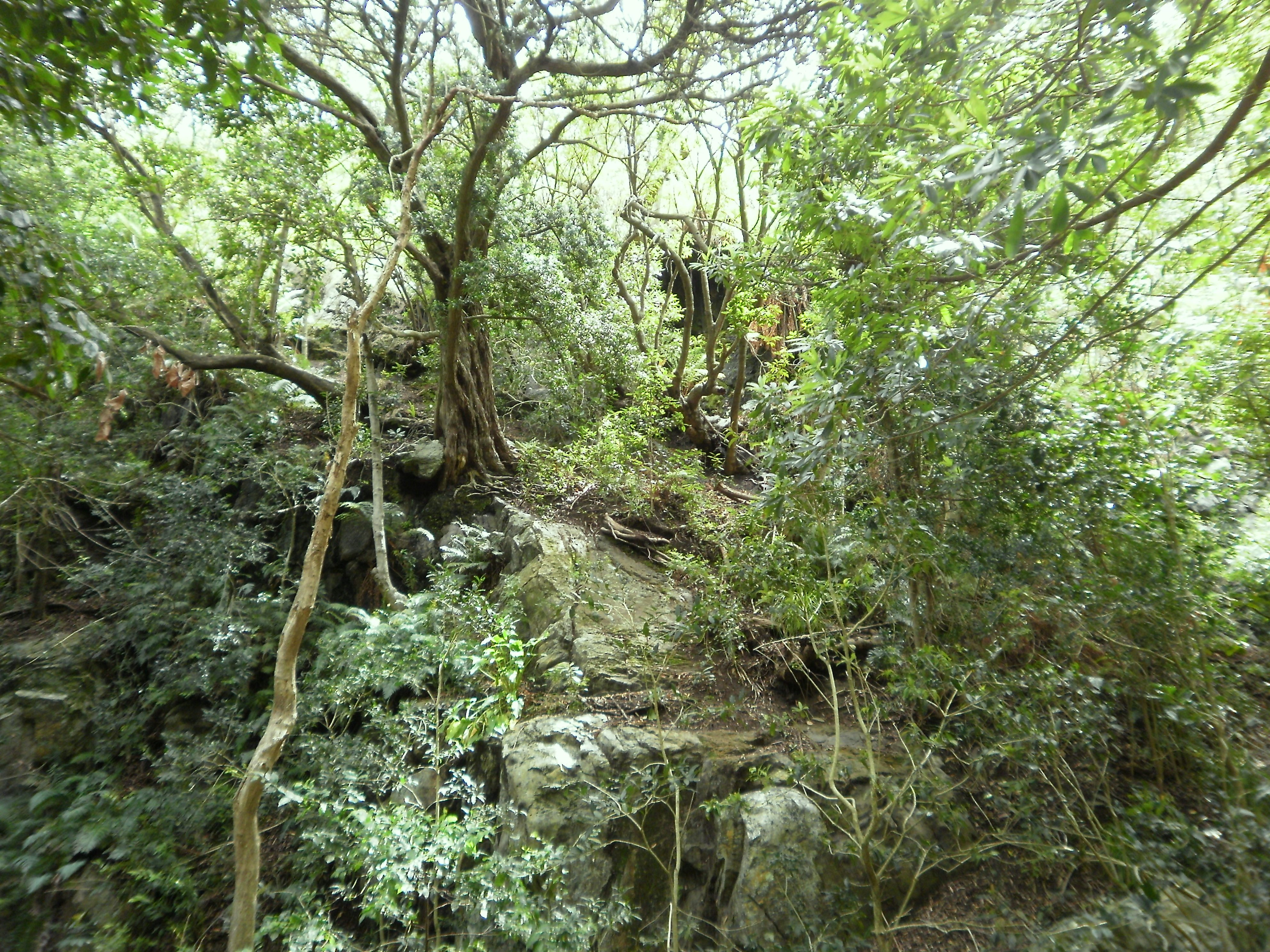
Afrotemperate forest

=== Afrotemperate Forest ===
The Afrotemperate Forest is by far the rarest vegetation type at Tokai, and belongs to the Forest Biome. Afrotemperate Forest cannot cope with fire, consequently it is confined to a few fire-safe kloofs at Tokai, minute pockets compared to the larger expanses in Orangekloof and Kirstenbosch. As forests go, Afrotemperate is the richest forest in temperate regions, however, its species richness pales into insignificance compared to Fynbos: barely 20 species of tree occur naturally in these forests.

Animals, mainly insects, abound in these forests and their species diversity is extraordinary given their area. There are only three small patches of Forest at Tokai, and their species have not been well documented. Afrotemperate Forest is well conserved, with over 99% in good condition within the City of Cape Town.

== Restoration of Tokai Park ==
Parts of Tokai Park remain under pine plantation, but all plantations are due to be harvested by 2022, as they are a planted crop grown on a commercial basis by a private company, MTO Forestry. When all the plantations are removed, Tokai Park is to be restored, and combined with the greater Table Mountain National Park.

Most of the plantations at Tokai Park have been harvested to date, and the Fynbos restored either actively or passively. Passive restoration involved a simple harvesting of plantations with no management nor prescribed burns to stimulate the Fynbos seedbanks. Consequently, these Fynbos sites have not recovered as well as those actively restored, and many alien shrubs and grasses are present. Subsequently, alien shrubs were systematically removed with pulling and cut stump treatment by management and a local Friends group.

A few sites were actively restored using fire, with either hot or cool burns. Anecdotally, it appears that sites with hotter fires contain more indigenous species, more indigenous plants, and less cover of alien annual grasses and weeds than those subjected to cooler fires. Fire is critically important for the restoration of Fynbos. At some sites, active restoration included species that had disappeared from the Fynbos seedbanks being replanted, amongst them the Rondevlei Spiderhead, Cape Flats Conebush and Iron Heath.

The result of the restoration is that over 440 plant species have recovered at Lower Tokai Park. This exceptional recovery is largely due to Fynbos seedbanks which are still intact after over 100 years of rotational plantations. These results mean that Cape Flats Sand Fynbos can be relatively easily restored and conserved within Tokai Park, and that the potential for passive restoration is high. Furthermore, Tokai Park has been identified as one of the top 80 priority areas for active restoration in Cape Town, out of thousands of vegetation remnants. It is possible that close to 500 species of plants will establish naturally here – based on a historical study by Purcell in the Bergvliet area.

Following the successful plant recovery at Tokai Park, wildlife such as Cape Fox, Porcupine, Caracal and wild bees are now recorded here, with more animal species expected as vegetation reaches maturity (later successional stage). A study was done comparing animal diversity in plantations relative to restored fynbos, using small mammals as bio-indicators (due to their high reproductive outputs and fast population turnover rates). Over 1800 trap-nights, 480 captures were made of 345 individuals from six species. Significantly higher numbers and more species of small mammals were found in the recovering fynbos sites compared to plantations, probably due to the higher plant diversity, vegetation density and biomass in the fynbos.

== Activities ==
Tokai Park is open year-round during daylight hours, and there are many different types of activities to do in the park, including nature walks, jogging, dog-walking, horse-riding, cycling and mountain biking. Many people enjoy walks around the perimeter trail at Lower Tokai, or on the numerous single track paths through the Fynbos, where others prefer to frequent Upper Tokai Park for its mountain biking trails and hiking up Constantiaberg. There are three gates at Lower Tokai, with parking available, and one at Middle Tokai, at the picnic and braai site, where people wishing to use Upper Tokai can park.

=== Walking ===
Tokai Park can be divided into three sections. The lower part of the park which is flat, the middle part which hosts the picnic and braai area and the Tokai Arboretum, and the upper part, which is steep and mountainous. Lower Tokai Park has numerous trails through the Cape Flats Sand Fynbos, the Restoration Trail, the Perimeter Trail and the Information Deck. There are several trails through the Tokai Arboretum, and the Elephants Eye trail which is right to the top of Constantiaberg. Dog walking is allowed at Lower Tokai Park with an activity permit, but it is forbidden at Upper Tokai Park. To hike at Upper Tokai Park (part of Table Mountain National Park), users must either pay a daily Conservation Fee, or enter with their valid Wild Card.

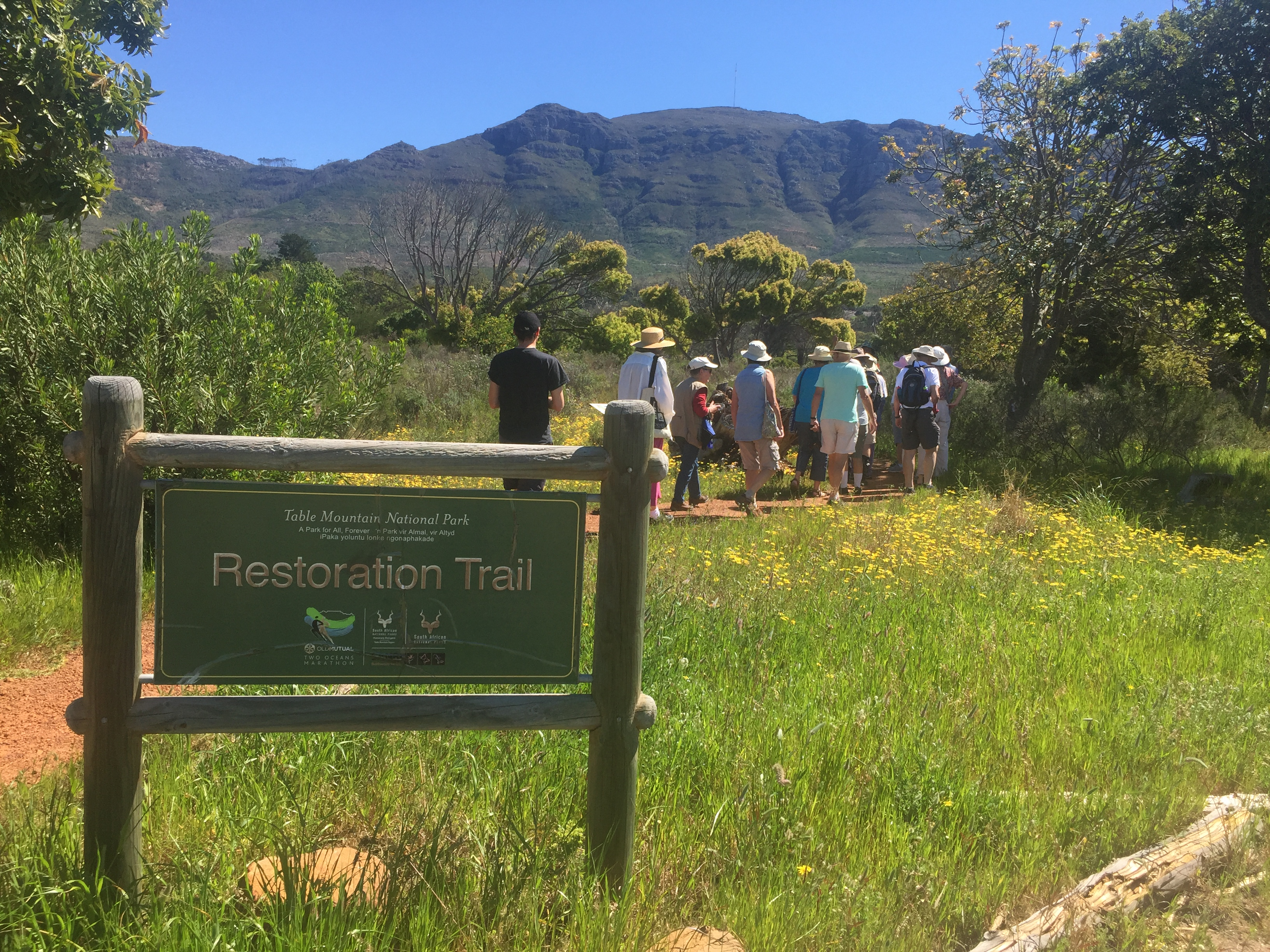
Restoration Trail at Tokai Park

=== The Restoration Trail ===
The Tokai Restoration Trail at Tokai Park is a short walk that showcases some rare plant species at Tokai, and includes 7 information boards on the following topics:

- Where does one begin with restoration?
- Why do we need to restore Fynbos at Tokai?
- How to restore a critical ecosystem
- Challenges: aliens, fire

Plant species showcased to date on the trail include: the Whorl Heath (Erica verticillata), the Yellow Creeping Brightfig (Lampranthus reptans), Capeflats Conebush (Leucadendron levisanus), Wattleleaf Conebush (Leucadendron macowanii), Snakestem Pincushion (Leucospermum hypophyllocarpodendron subsp. hypophyllocarpodendron), Mountain Dahlia (Liparia splendens subsp. splendens), Marsh Pagoda (Mimetes hirtus), Wynberg Spiderhead (Serruria cyanoides), Rondevlei Spiderhead (Serruria foeniculacea), and the Trident Spiderhead (Serruria trilopha).

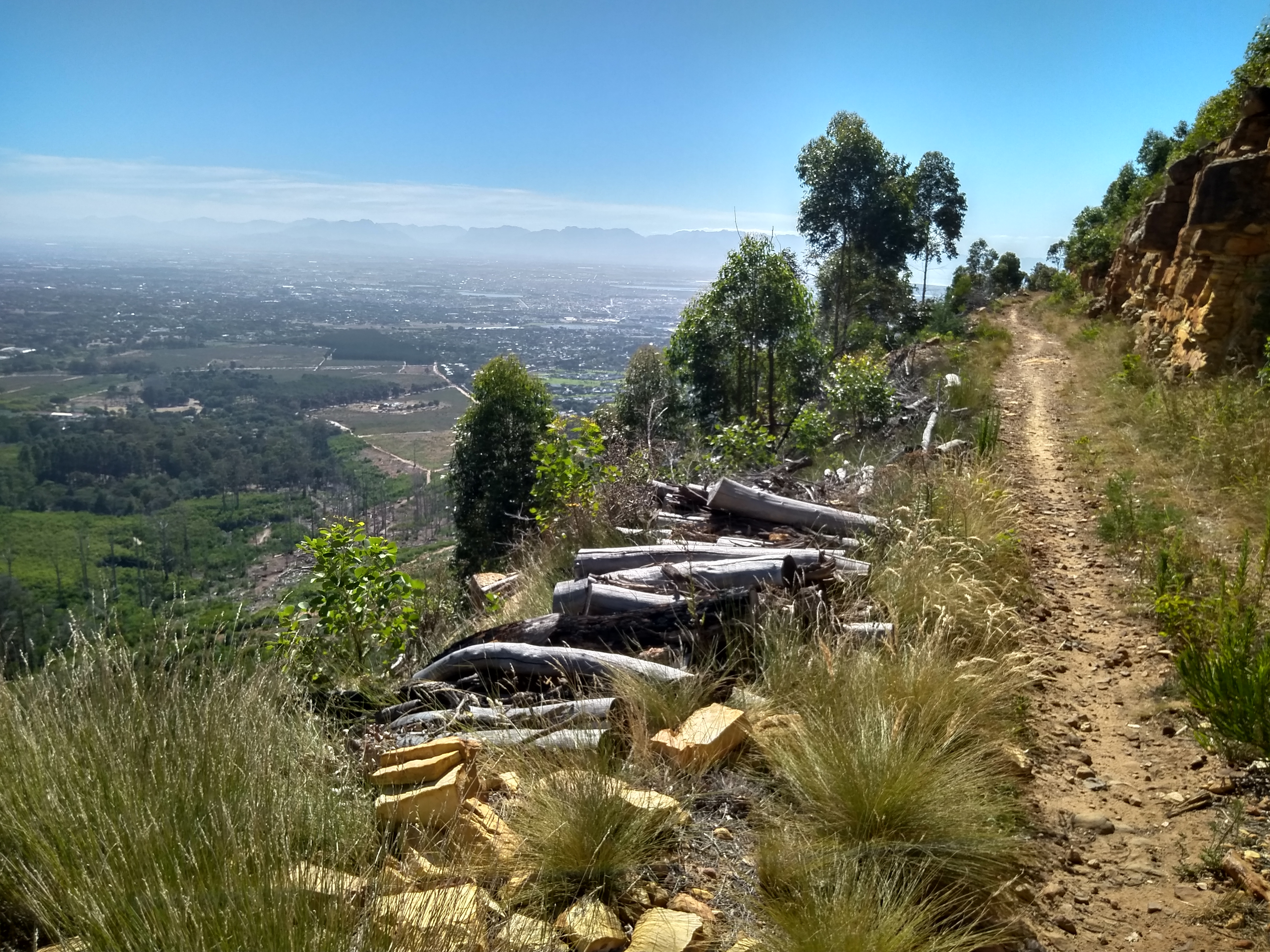
Mountain Biking at Tokai

=== Mountain Biking ===
There are 21 mountain biking trails at Tokai Park, and they are divided into three categories depending on their difficulty. Green graded trails are easy flowing single tracks (beginners), blue graded trails are for those with more experience and include obstacles, and black graded trails are for expert riders. Permits are required to use the mountain biking trails at Tokai Park.

=== Alternative Shaded Recreation ===
There are 10 shaded greenbelts in close proximity to Tokai Park. The various trails are 20–35 minutes long from start to end, some flat, some steeper. These are:

- Doordrift Walk: 25-30 min
- Alphen Trail: 20-25 min
- Diep River Trail: 25-35 min
- Klaasenbosch Trail: 30-45 min
- Brommersvlei Walk: 20-25 min
- Die Hel Nature Area: 45-55 min
- Grootboschkloof Trail: 20-25 min
- Spaansgemat River Trail: 25-35 min
- Silverhurst Trail: 30-35 min
- Keysers River Trail: 30-35 min

== See also ==
- Biodiversity of Cape Town – Diversity of the natural environment of Cape Town
