= Rondebosch Common =

Conservation area in Cape Town

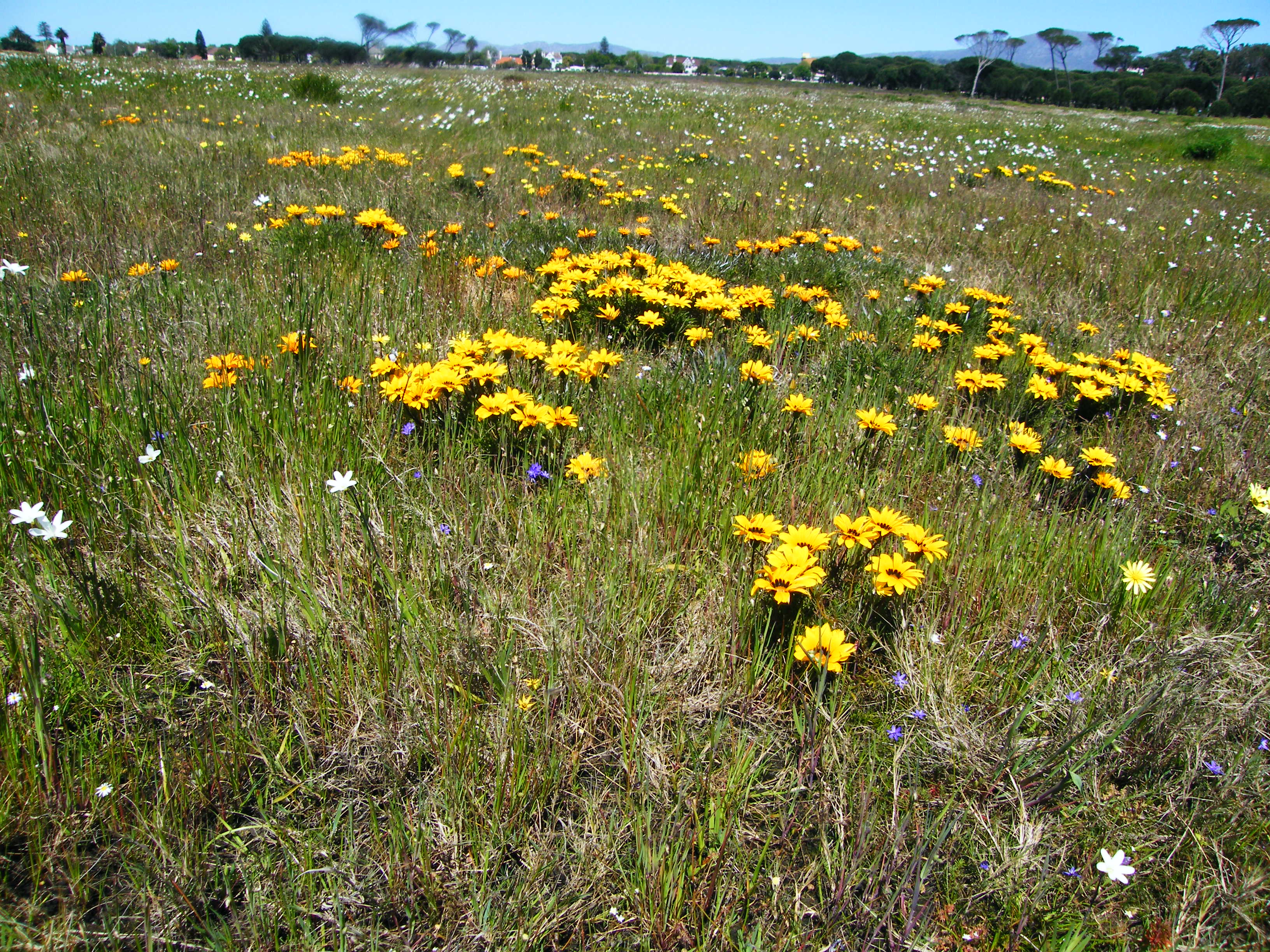
- Gazania flowers in spring on Rondebosch Common.
- Interactive map of Rondebosch Common
- Location: Cape Town, South Africa
- Coordinates: 33°57′20″S 18°29′00″E
- Area: 40 hectares (100 acres)
- Established: 1961; 65 years ago

Rondebosch Common is an open common of about 40 hectares (100 acres) in Rondebosch, Cape Town in South Africa. A common is defined as "a piece of open land for public use, esp. in a village or town". It contains one of the few surviving pockets of the critically endangered “Cape Flats Sand Fynbos” vegetation type, which exists nowhere else in the world.

== Biodiversity ==
Rondebosch Common is a National Monument and an important conservation area for the critically endangered Cape Flats Sand Fynbos vegetation. This type of fynbos exists only in Cape Town, and has become critically endangered due to the urban development which has covered most of the Cape Flats. The common also conserves a few patches of Renosterveld and a seasonal wetland, giving it a hugely varied biodiversity for such a small area. Of the hundreds of plant species that occur here, at least nine are on the Red Data List. This stretch of land also protects 110 species of birds, as well as small mammals, reptiles and amphibians. The local biodiversity is threatened by invasive plants such as Kikuyu grass. A portion of the common is also covered by introduced stone pines (Pinus pinea).

== History ==
In the past, Rondebosch Common was used as a military camp (hence the name of Camp Ground Road, which borders the common on the west). In 1805, the local Dutch farmers rallied here before the decisive Battle of Blaauwberg, and troops were regularly stationed here, even up until the Second World War. The open area has steadily decreased over time, as piece after piece was taken for housing, so that today only 40 hectares remain. The remaining land was proclaimed a National Monument in 1961, and today it is used as a recreational area for the surrounding communities.

== "Take back the Commons" ==
On January 27, 2012, 42 members of a group called "Take back the Commons" were arrested by the South African Police Service for holding what the city labelled as an illegal gathering on and near the common. Supporters of the protest said the city was manipulating the Regulation of Gatherings Act and blamed Mayor Patricia de Lille for illegally authorising the use of excessive force.

== See also ==
- Biodiversity of Cape Town
- List of nature reserves in Cape Town
- Cape Flats Sand Fynbos
- Common land
