= Kenilworth Racecourse Conservation Area =

Nature reserve in Cape Town, South Africa

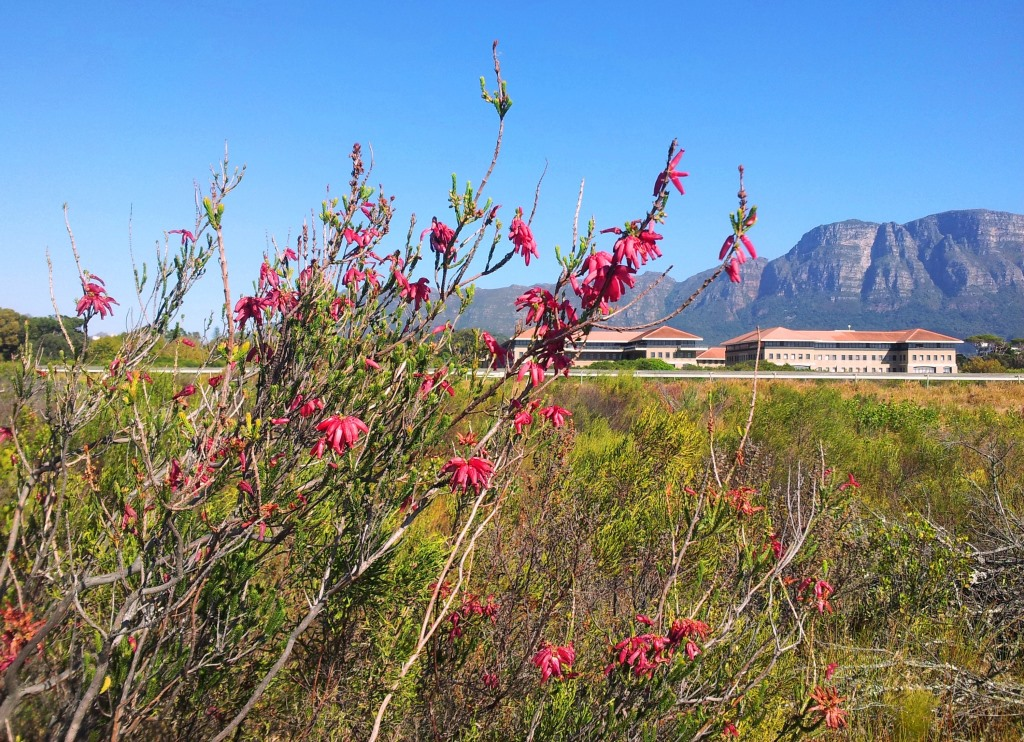
- Interactive map of Kenilworth Racecourse Conservation Area
- Location: Kenilworth, Cape Town, South Africa
- Coordinates: 33.997°S 18.4844°E
- Area: 52 ha (130 acres)
- Established: 1985; 41 years ago

Kenilworth Racecourse Conservation Area is a 52-hectare (130-acre) nature reserve, situated in the centre of Kenilworth Racecourse, in Cape Town, South Africa. Due to its location, it has been left undisturbed for more than 100 years, making it now the best preserved patch of “Cape Flats Sand Fynbos” in the world.

The reserve contains indigenous fynbos and wetlands – both permanent and seasonal. Among the hundreds of plant species that can be found here, at least 20 are threatened with extinction. There are also endemic species, and two plants (Erica verticillata and Erica turgida) are listed as extinct in the wild, but have recently been re-introduced here. The reserve is home to the critically endangered Micro Frog (Microbatrachella capensis) along with other small but healthy populations of mammals, reptiles, amphibians and birds.

Invasive alien vegetation is a severe problem, especially Port Jackson willow (Acacia saligna) and domestic garden escapees.

== See also ==
- Biodiversity of Cape Town
- List of nature reserves in Cape Town
- Cape Flats Sand Fynbos
- Cape Lowland Freshwater Wetland
