= Tokai Arboretum =

Silviculture experimental station in Cape Town, South Africa

- Interactive map of Tokai Arboretum
- Location: Tokai Arboretum (South Africa)
- Nearest city: Cape Town
- Coordinates: 34°03′35″S 18°25′00″E
- Area: 64 acres (26 ha)
- Governing body: South African National Parks
- Website: South African National Parks

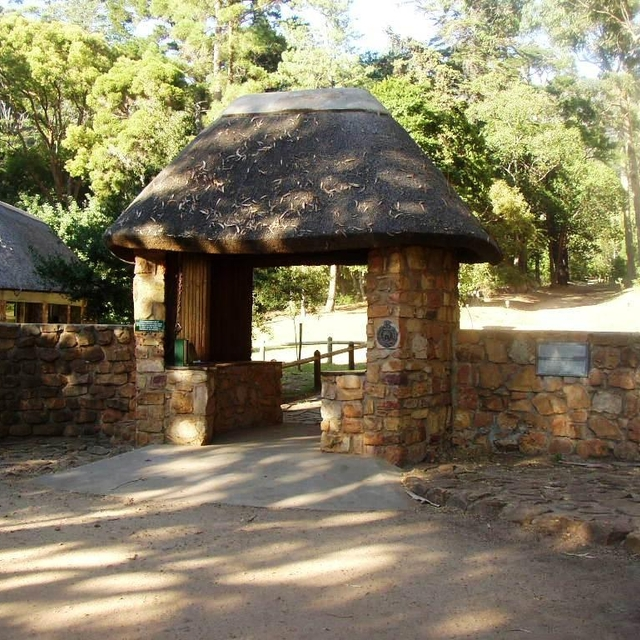
Tokai Arboretum, Tokai Park

The Tokai Arboretum was the first large-scale silviculture experimental station in Cape Town, South Africa. The area of the main Arboretum, at Tokai Park, is 14 ha. Several adjacent compartments extend the area to 26 ha. The Arboretum was declared a National Monument in 1985, on its 100th anniversary. It contains stands of Eucalyptus and other trees from the original silviculture experiments in South Africa. In the 1990s a Gondwana Garden was created to display the plants typical of the Cape 100 million years ago.

The Tokai Arboretum is a collection of trees of different sizes, established without a silvicultural or arboricultural plan (lack of open vistas, swards, shrubberies and beds of flowers to display the trees). Tokai Arboretum has stands of karri (Eucalyptus diversicolor), scribbly gum, jarrah (Eucalyptus marginata), redwoods (Sequoioideae), Aleppo pines (Pinus halepensis), stone pines (Pinus pinea) and many other tree species. There are about 28 trees in the main Arboretum with record heights for South Africa.

The main Arboretum at Tokai is the oldest wholly government financed arboretum in South Africa. Following the establishment of the main Arboretum, three lesser arboreta were initiated at Tokai Plantation, namely the Paddock Arboretum (on infertile sands of the Cape Flats), the Spekboom Belt Arboretum (on fertile granite slopes) and the Flagstaff Arboretum. The latter was soon abandoned.

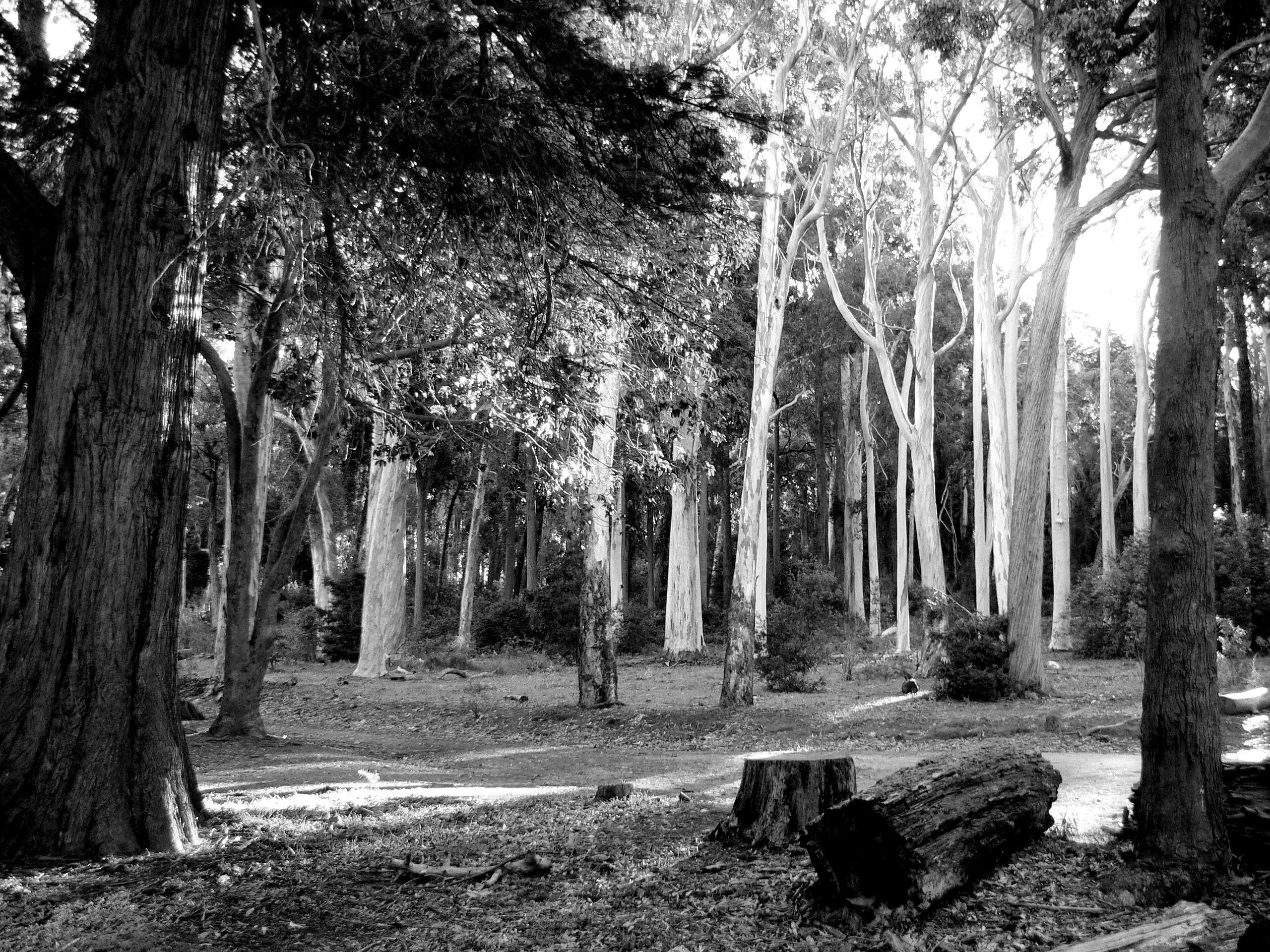
Gum trees at Tokai Arboretum

== History ==
The first exotic plantings at Tokai were made in 1694, when English oaks (Quercus robur) were established there by Simon van der Stel. The earliest attempt at commercial afforestation at Tokai was in 1884 when Joseph Storr Lister planted Monterey pines (Pinus radiata). In 1886 an arboretum was laid out adjoining the nursery at Tokai, and 150 species were established, including a few indigenous species. There were already some stone pine present in a small copse. During 1902 some additional 43 plant species were established in the Tokai Arboretum. A systematic effort was made to introduce other exotic species for plantation trial and it was decided to obtain species from countries with similar climates. Trees from Australia, India, the southern states of North America and Mexico consequently received attention. The plantation trials revealed that conifers were more suited to the Cape Flats than broad-leaved trees, although Eucalyptus did well on deeper, richer soils.

From 1906-1911 Tokai hosted The South African Forestry School "for training men for the higher grades of the Forest Service." Two students of this school, J.D.M. Keet and A.J. O'Conner, later became directors of national forestry. In 1932 this school was moved to Saasveld, near George, Western Cape. In 1933 the director of forestry, Mr. J.D.M. Keet, requested the conservator of forestry to devote more attention to the Tokai Arboretum's upkeep, and provided specific instructions, aimed at making the area more attractive to visitors and at improving its educational and scientific value. However, the Tokai Arboretum lapsed steadily into a state of greater neglect. During 1951, Mr. Paul Sauer, as minister of forestry, also remarked unfavourably on the unkempt appearance and the absence of labels for tree species.

== Current state ==
Although many of the trees are healthy, many are dead or moribund. Heavy invasions by Long-leaf Wattle, Blackwood, Cypress, Eucalyptus and Australian Cheesewood need to be continuously controlled. Black Locust and English Elm are coppicing particularly badly. Heavy invasions by Outeniqua and Real Yellowwood (alien to the Cape Flats) are also evident. Some areas are heavily infested with Kikuyu and Buffalo Grass. The roads through the main Arboretum are also generally in a poor condition.
