= Witzands Aquifer Conservation Area =

Protected natural area in Cape Town, South Africa

Witzands Aquifer Nature Reserve
- Map of Western Cape
- Location: Cape Town, South Africa
- Nearest city: Atlantis
- Coordinates: 33.6329°S 18.4242°E
- Area: 3,000 ha (7,400 acres)
- Website: www.capetown.gov.za/Family%20and%20home/See-all-city-facilities/Our-recreational-facilities/Nature%20reserves/Witzands%20Aquifer%20Nature%20Reserve
- Witzands Aquifer Conservation Area (South Africa) Witzands Aquifer Conservation Area (Western Cape)

Witzands Aquifer Nature Reserve is a 3,000-hectare (7,400-acre) protected natural area in Cape Town, South Africa, located on the city's northern outskirts. This reserve protects an important part of Cape Town's natural and cultural heritage, including the Atlantis Aquifer. It is adjacent to the Koeberg Nature Reserve.

== Biodiversity ==
The conservation area consists of two priority nature sites, the Silwerstroomstrand Conservation Area and the Atlantis Dunefields. They protect a patch of Atlantis Sand Fynbos vegetation type, as well as Cape Flats Dune Strandveld. Both vegetation types are endangered. The local landscape consists of sandy beaches, rocky shorelines and outcrops, as well as mobile dunes. Among the many animals that can be found in this reserve is the globally threatened black harrier, the caracal, the steenbok, the Cape grysbok and a variety of other mammals, birds, reptiles and amphibians.

=== Vegetation ===
The endemic and vulnerable Leucospermum parile is found in the Atlantis Sand Fynbos region. And the critically endangered Erica margaritacea is also found here.

- Bokbaaivygie (Cleretum bellidiforme)
- Dune reed (Thamnochortus spicigerus)
- Lanceleaf sage (Salvia lanceolata)
- Sand primrose (Grielum grandiflorum)
- Strandroos (Limonium peregrinum)

=== Mammals ===
There are possible 83 species of mammal that occur in the reserve, with 16 endemic to South Africa. The endangered white-tailed rat is found here.

- Cape dune mole-rat
- Cape grysbok
- Caracal
- Small grey mongoose
- Steenbok

== Recreation ==
The conservation area is host to various recreational activities, including sand-boarding, camping and whale watching, and the reserve is also used for film shoots, quad biking and picnics.

== See also ==
- Biodiversity of Cape Town
- List of nature reserves in Cape Town
- Atlantis Sand Fynbos
- Cape Flats Dune Strandveld
- Atlantis Dunes
