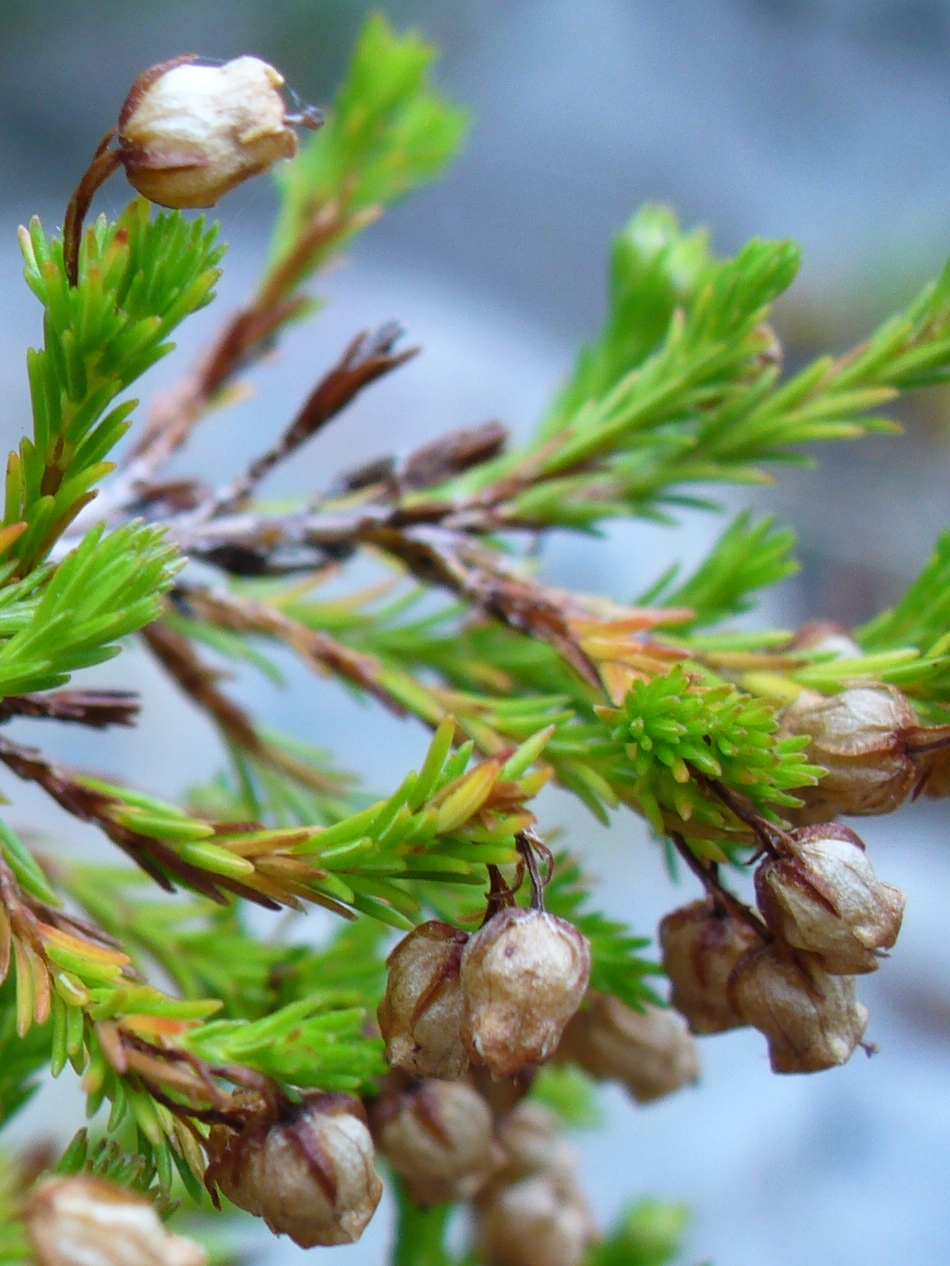

Conservation status
- Critically endangered (SANBI Red List)

Scientific classification
- Kingdom: Plantae
- Clade: Tracheophytes
- Clade: Angiosperms
- Clade: Eudicots
- Clade: Asterids
- Order: Ericales
- Family: Ericaceae
- Genus: Erica
- Species: E. margaritacea

Binomial name
- Erica margaritacea Sol.

= Erica margaritacea =

Species of flowering plant

Erica margaritacea, the pearl heath, is a species of Erica naturally restricted to the city of Cape Town. It is critically endangered.

Historically, the plant grew naturally in the Cape Flats Sand Fynbos of the Southern Suburbs, Cape Town. However, urban development caused it to go extinct in the wild. Specimens that were preserved by botanists were used to reintroduce this species to the last remaining patch of its habitat, the Kenilworth Racecourse Conservation Area.

It produces enormous amounts of white, pearl-shaped flowers and can readily be cultivated in urban gardens.
