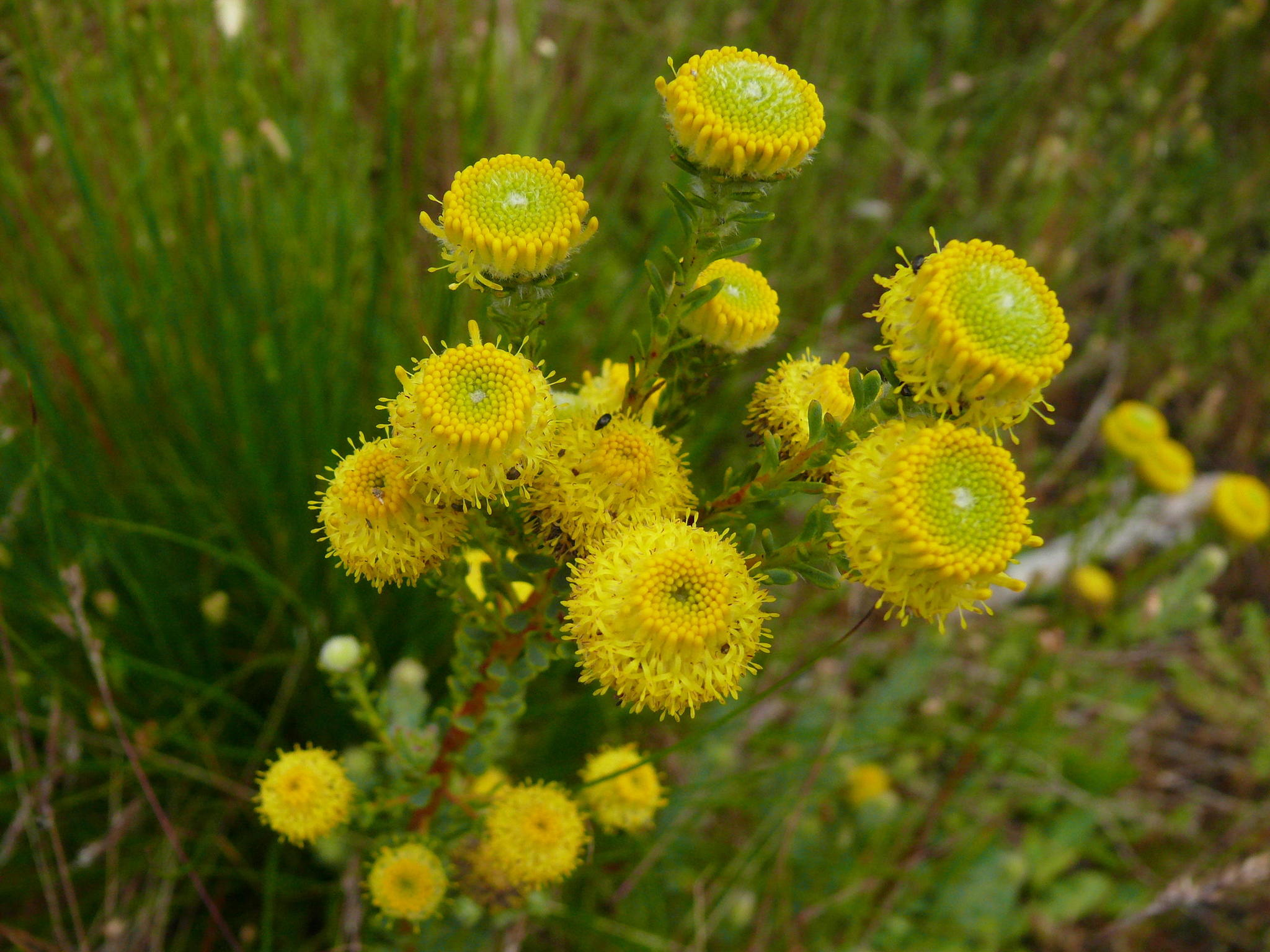

Conservation status
- Critically Endangered (IUCN 3.1)

Scientific classification
- Kingdom: Plantae
- Clade: Tracheophytes
- Clade: Angiosperms
- Clade: Eudicots
- Order: Proteales
- Family: Proteaceae
- Genus: Leucadendron
- Species: L. levisanus

Binomial name
- Leucadendron levisanus (L.) P.J.Bergius

Synonyms
- Brunia levisanus L.; Leucadendron hirsutum Hoffmanns.; Protea fusca L.; Protea hirsuta Willd.; Protea hirsuta Thunb.; Protea levisanus (L.) L.; Protea tenuifolia Salisb.

= Leucadendron levisanus =

Cape flats conebush

Species of plant

Leucadendron levisanus, commonly known as the Cape flats conebush, is a flower-bearing shrub that belongs to the genus Leucadendron and forms part of the fynbos. The plant is native to the Western Cape, where it occurs in the Cape Flats from Vishoek to Eerste River and Mamre. The shrub grows 2 m (6 ft 7 in) tall and bears flowers in October.

Fire destroys the plant but the seeds survive. The seeds are stored in a toll on the female plant and are released where they fall to the ground and are possibly spread by the wind. The plant is unisexual and there are male and female plants. Insects do the pollination. The plant grows mainly in sandy soil at altitudes of 0 to 100 m (0 to 328 ft).

== Gallery ==
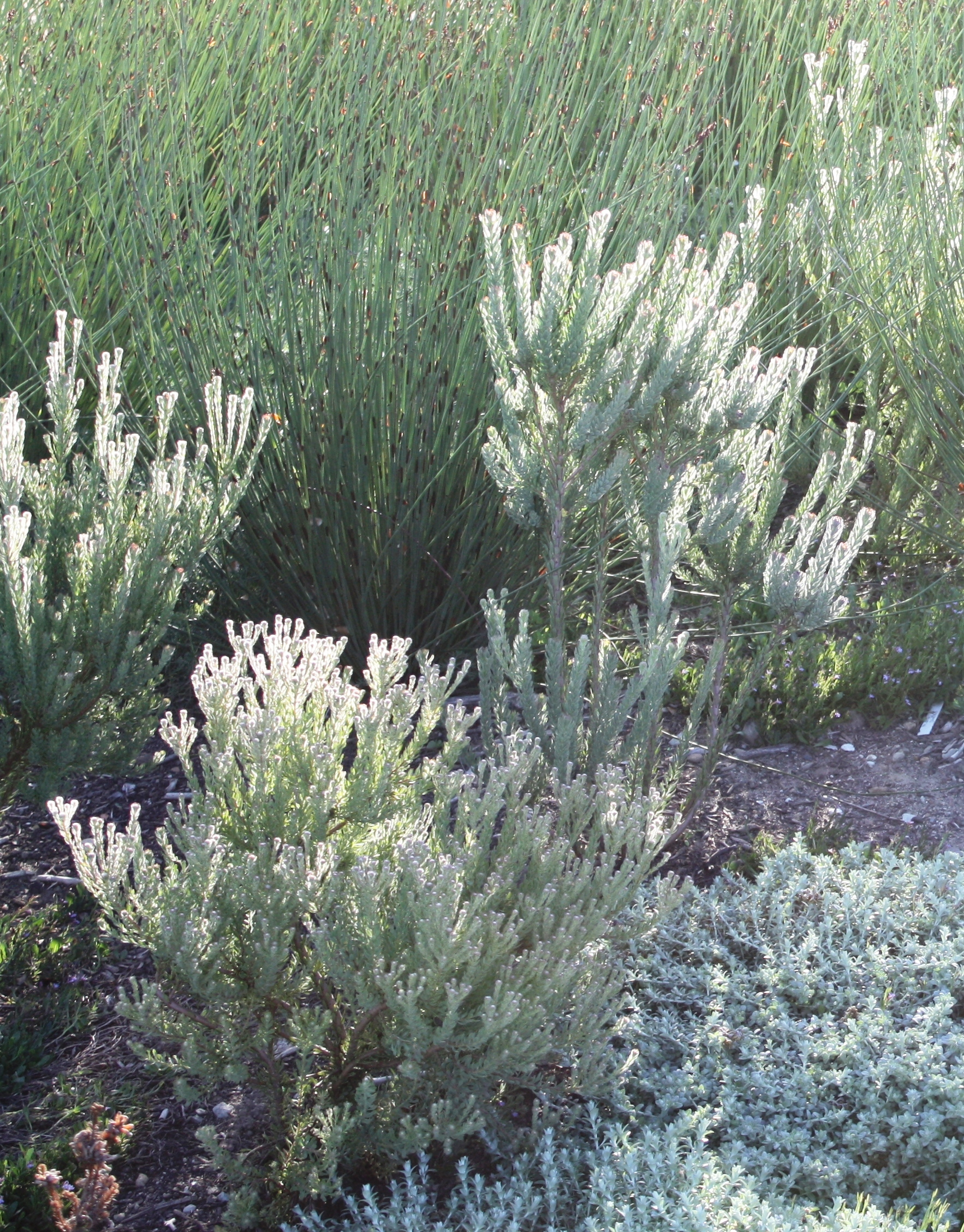

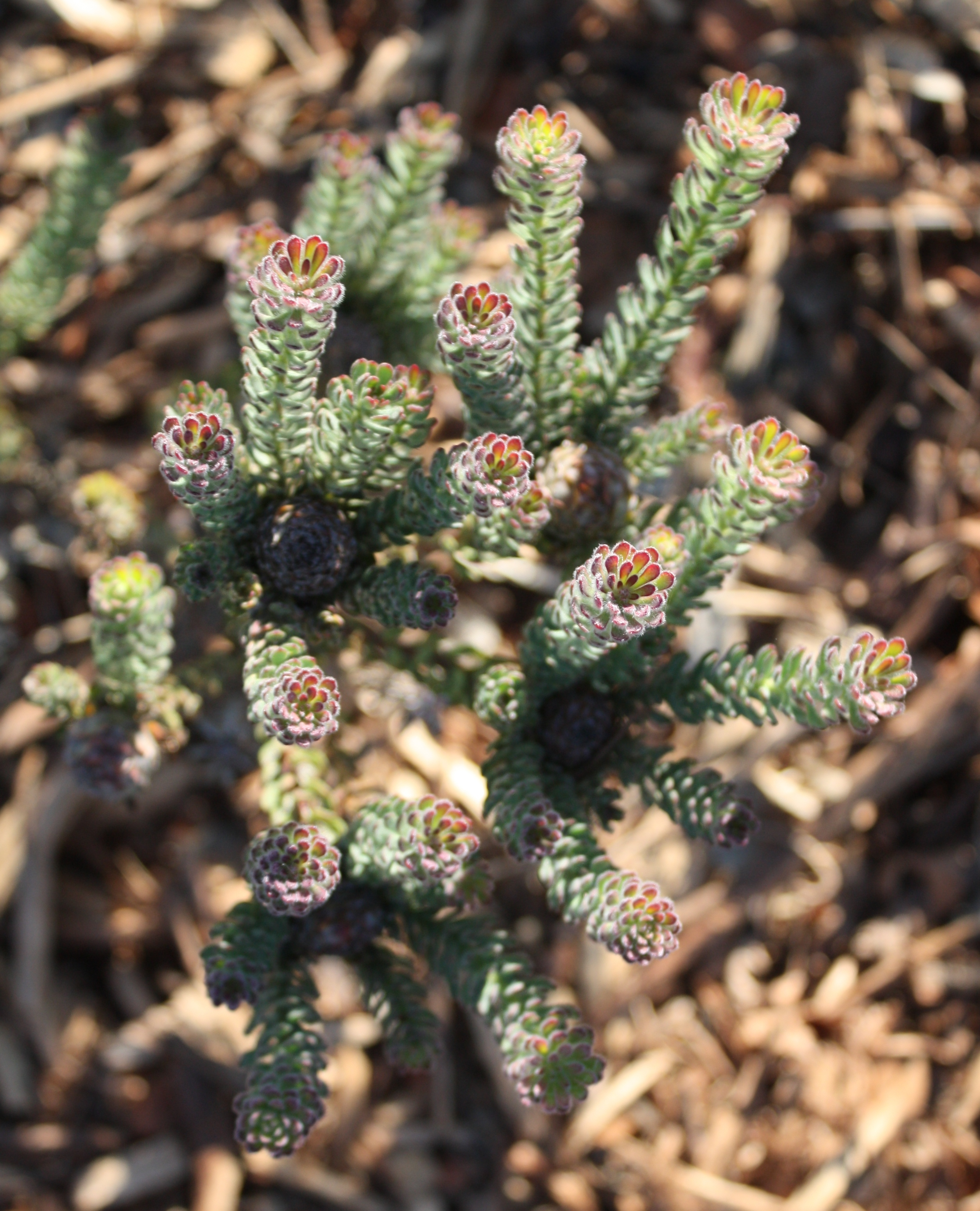

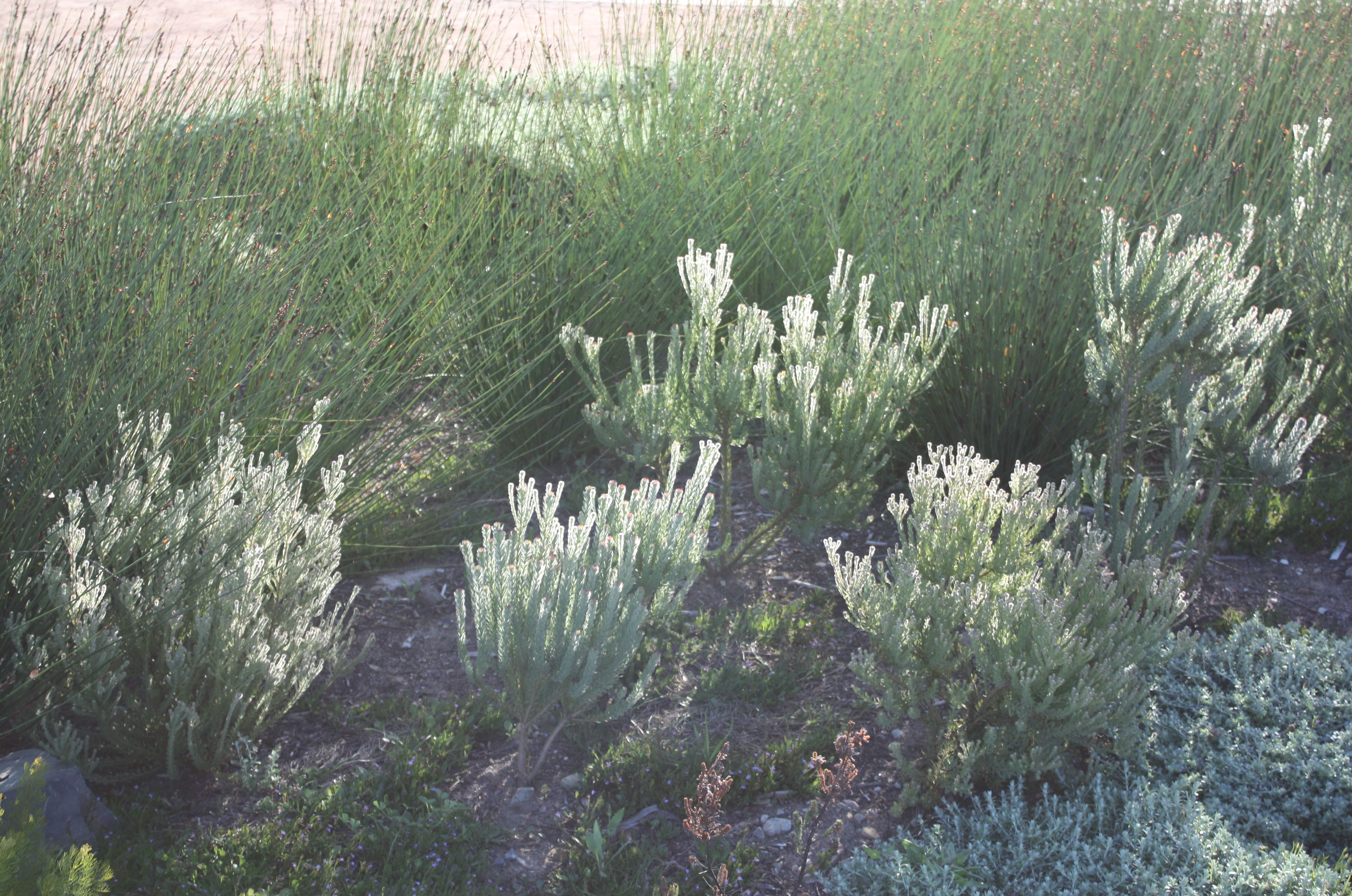

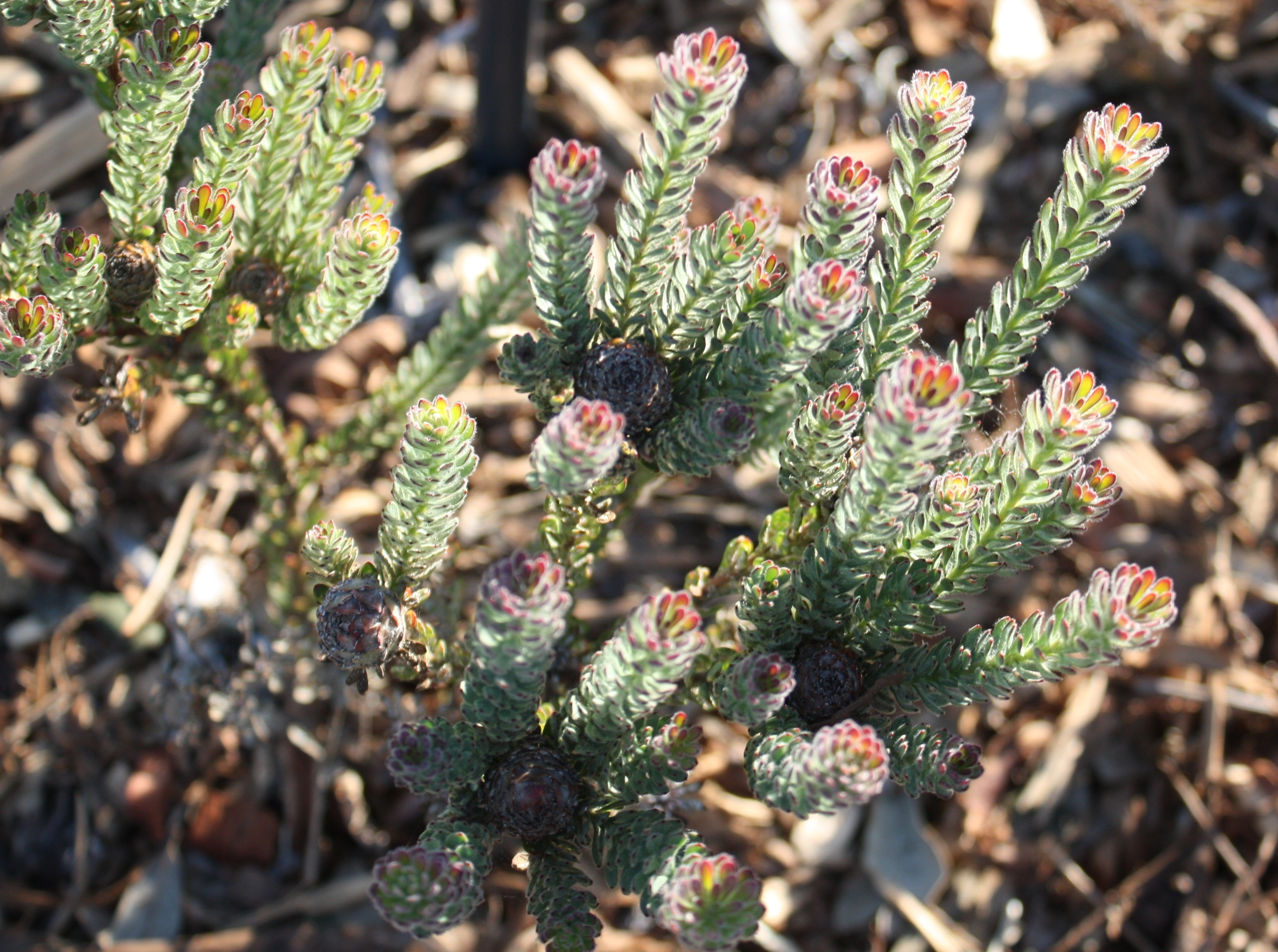
