= Zeekoevlei =

Freshwater lake on the Cape Flats in Cape Town

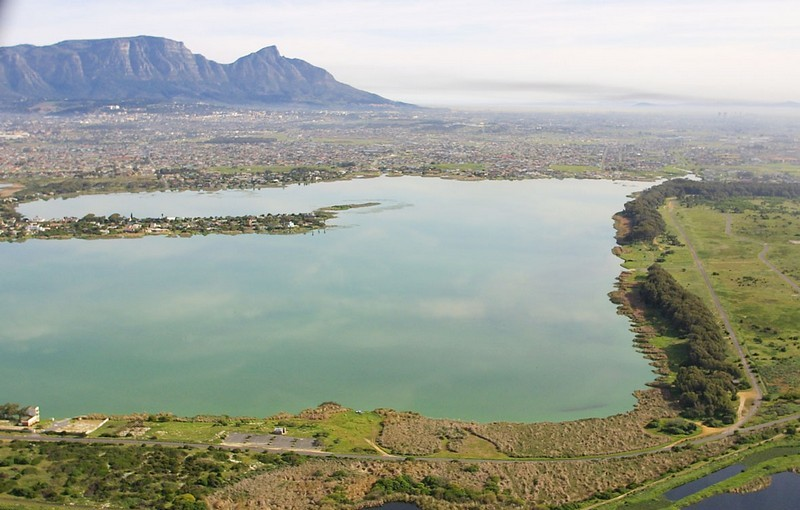
- Zeekoevlei in the Southern Suburbs of Cape Town, with the edge of Table Mountain visible in the background

- Location within South Africa
- Location: Western Cape Province, South Africa
- Coordinates: 34°04′S 18°31′E
- Type: lake
- Surface area: 258 hectares (640 acres)

Zeekoevlei is a freshwater lake in the Southern Suburbs of Cape Town, South Africa. The lake is 258 hectares (640 acres) in area. Its name means hippopotamus pond or lake, from the Afrikaans words seekoei (literally "sea cow") and vlei.

Zeekoevlei Nature Reserve (established in June 2000) is based on the lake. The total area of the reserve is 344 hectares (850 acres). It is separated by a peninsula from the Rondevlei Nature Reserve and preserves endangered Cape Lowland Freshwater Wetland ecosystems.

Zeekoevlei is used for recreational rowing and sailing.

== See also ==
- Biodiversity of Cape Town – Diversity of the natural environment of Cape Town
- List of nature reserves in Cape Town
- Rondevlei Nature Reserve – Protected wetlands in Cape Town, South Africa
- Cape Lowland Freshwater Wetland – Vegetation type endemic to the Western Cape, South Africa
