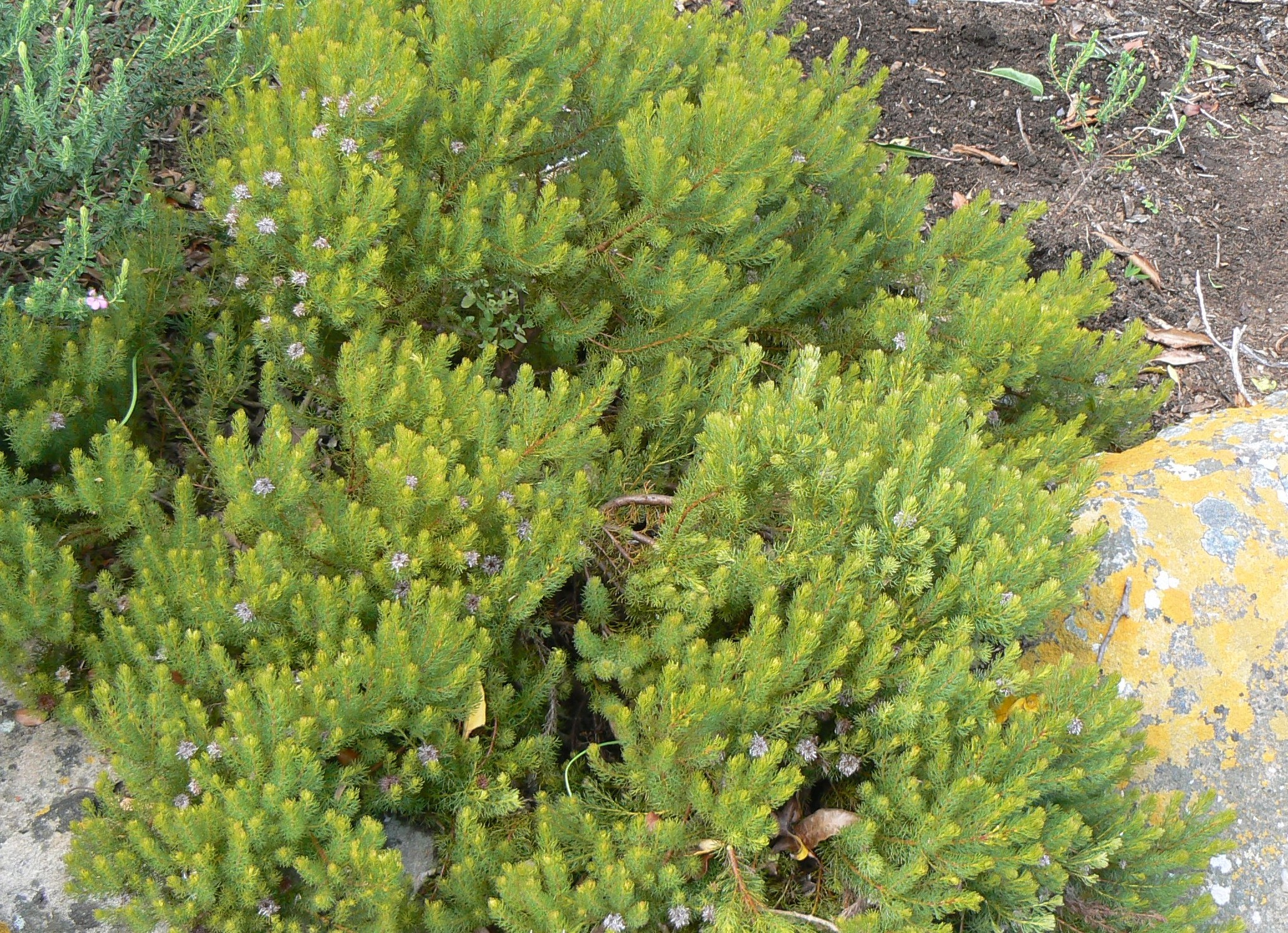

Conservation status
- Critically Endangered (IUCN 2.3)

Scientific classification
- Kingdom: Plantae
- Clade: Embryophytes
- Clade: Tracheophytes
- Clade: Angiosperms
- Clade: Eudicots
- Order: Proteales
- Family: Proteaceae
- Genus: Serruria
- Species: S. aemula

Binomial name
- Serruria aemula Salisb. ex Knight

= Serruria aemula =

Species of flowering plant endemic to South Africa

Serruria aemula is a critically endangered species of flowering plant in the family Proteaceae, endemic to South Africa. It is known by the common name of strawberry spiderhead.

This plant used to occur in large numbers on the Cape Flats of Cape Town. Its natural habitat now lies under urban sprawl so only a few plants survive on patches of road-side. Several of its subspecies are now in fact extinct in the wild, surviving only in botanical gardens. Mostly it grows up to 0.5 m (1 ft 8 in) in height.

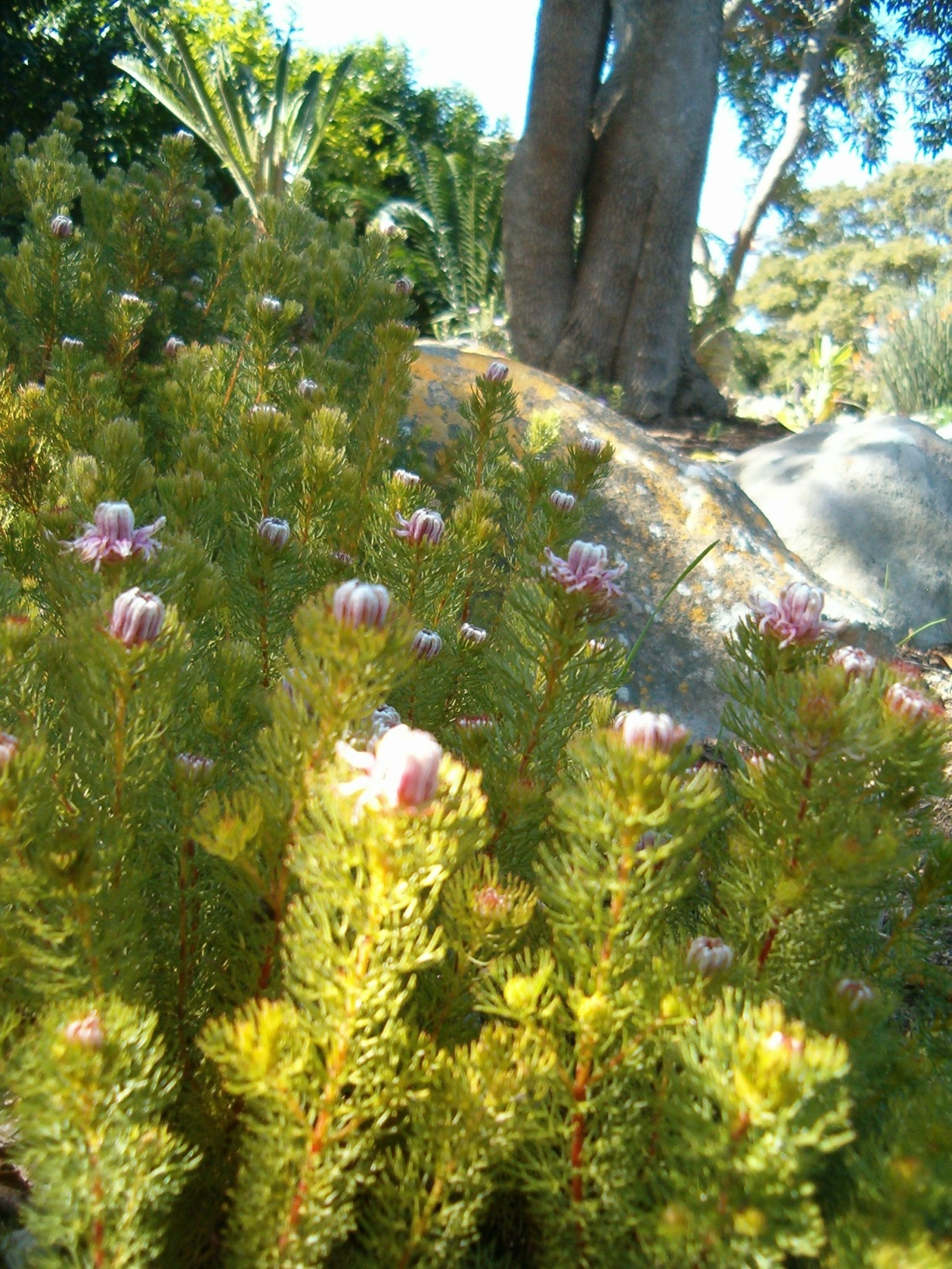

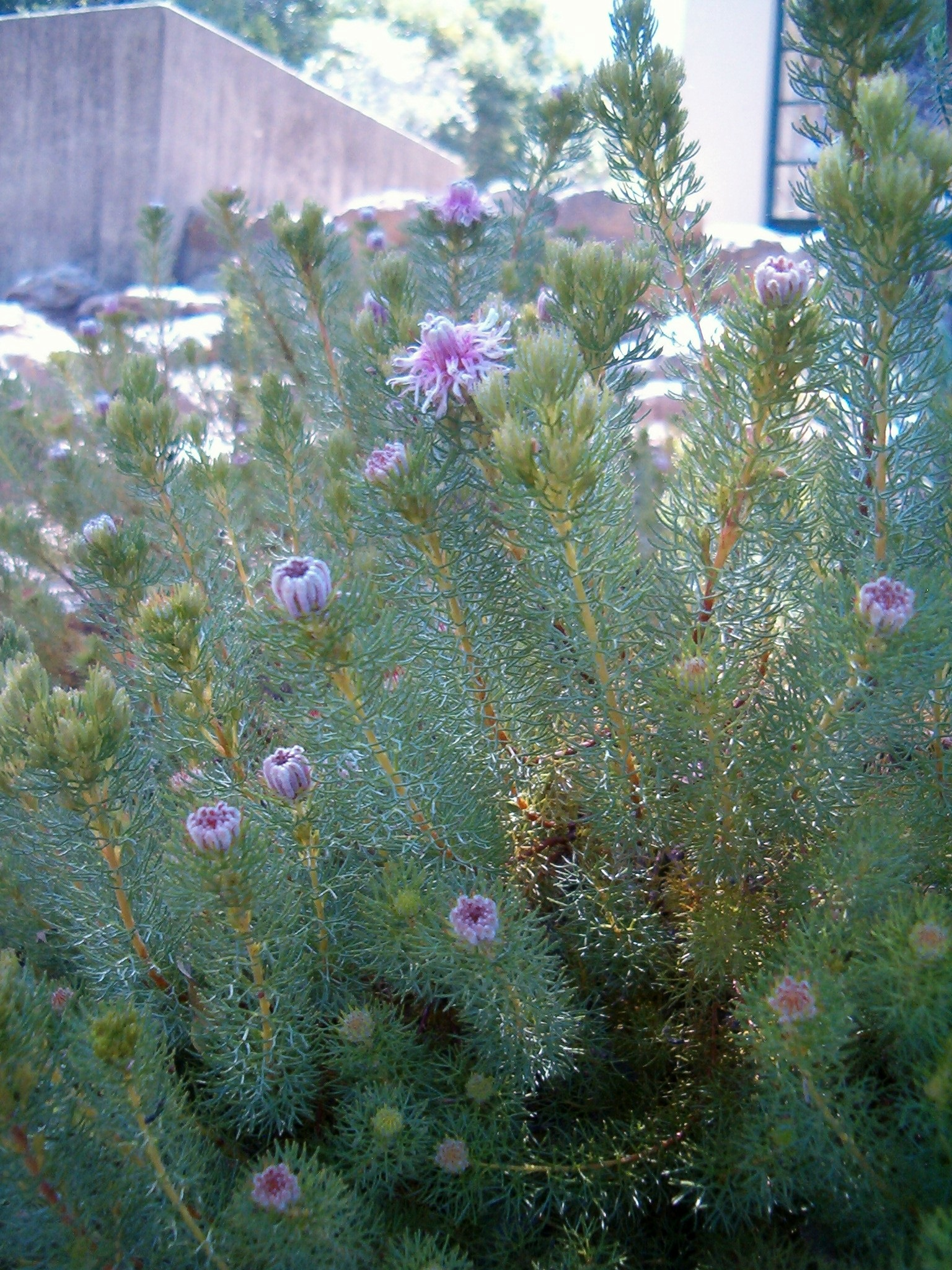

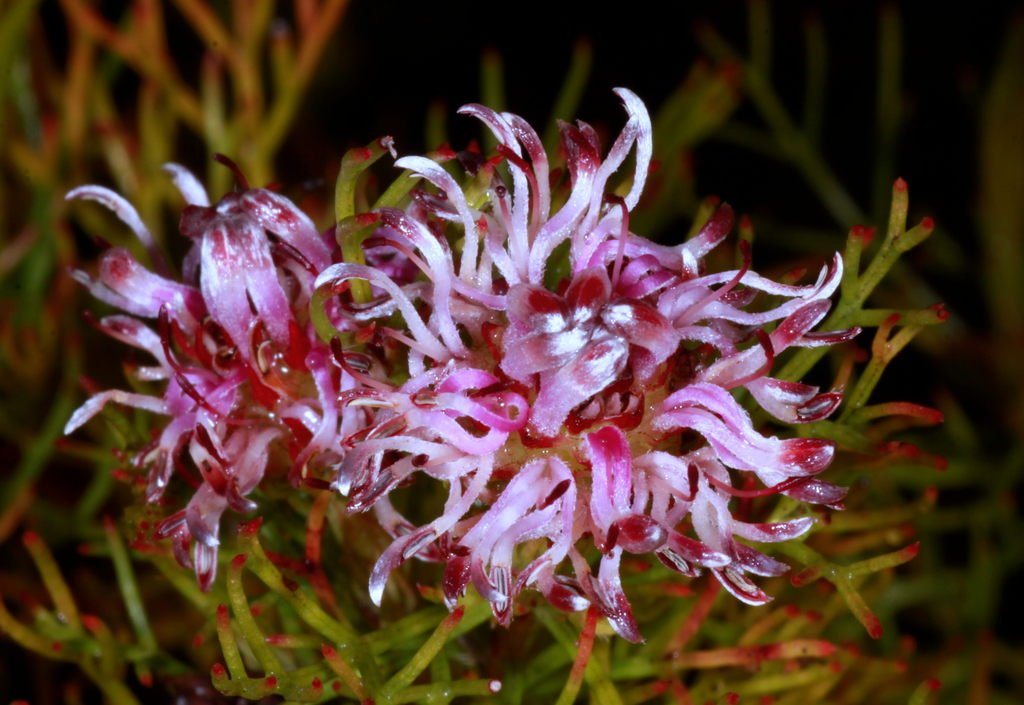
