= Rondevlei Nature Reserve =

Protected wetlands in Cape Town, South Africa

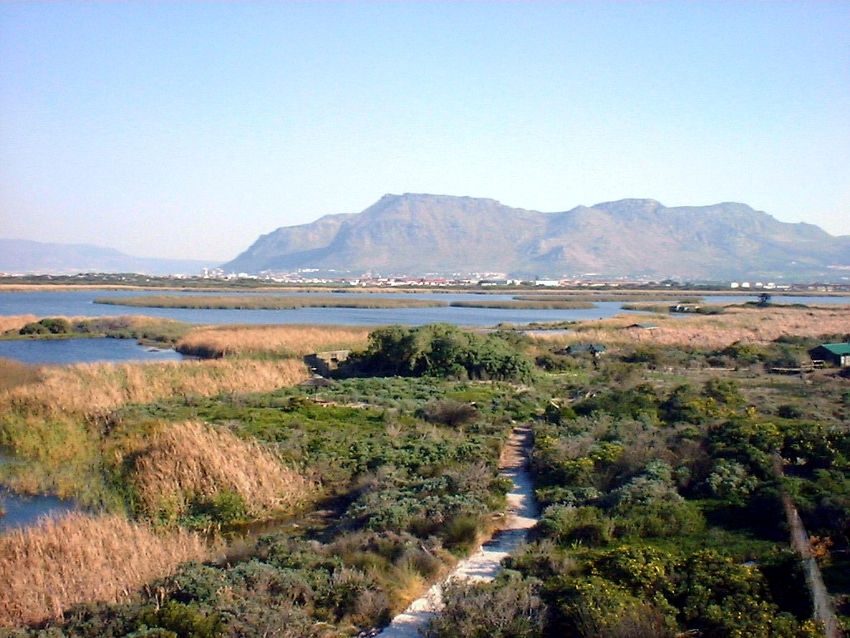
- View from one of the observation towers over Rondevlei towards Muizenberg.
- Location of Rondevlei Nature Reserve
- Location: Cape Town, South Africa
- Coordinates: 34°03′45″S 18°30′00″E
- Area: 290 ha (720 acres)
- Established: 1952
- Rondevlei Nature Reserve (South Africa) Rondevlei Nature Reserve (Western Cape)

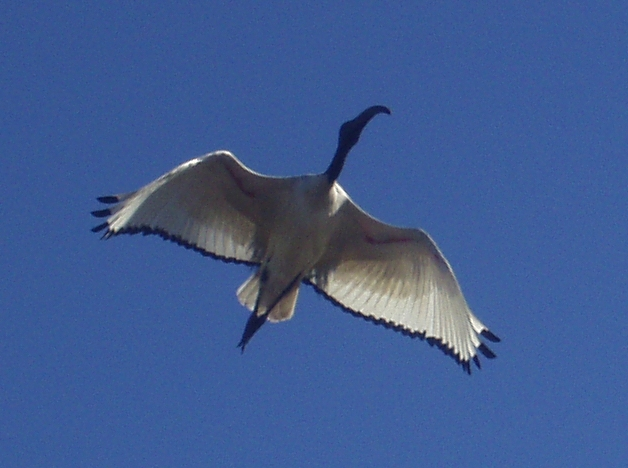
Sacred ibis flying above Rondevlei.

The Rondevlei Nature Reserve is located in Grassy Park, Zeekoevlei and Lavenderhill, suburbs of Cape Town, South Africa. The bird sanctuary covers approximately 290 hectares (720 acres) of mostly permanent wetland and consists of a single large brackish lagoon. The nature reserve is among the most important wetlands for birds in South Africa despite being situated directly alongside the Zeekoevlei. A number of islands on the vlei act as vital breeding sites. Rondevlei is home to about 230 bird species, a variety of small mammals and reptiles including caracal, porcupine, Cape fox, grysbuck, steenbuck and mongoose, as well as a hippopotamus population re-introduced in 1981 as a means to control an alien grass species from South America which had covered the shoreline and was threatening to engulf the vlei itself. It has unusual and threatened ecosystems like strandveld, sand plains fynbos, Cape lowland wetland vegetation and indigenous coastal fynbos vegetation with unique plants found nowhere else in the world.

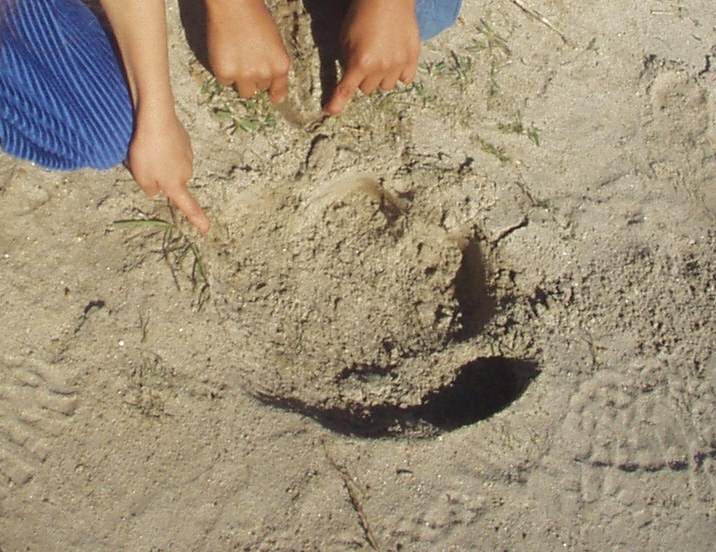
Footprint of a hippo on the waterside trail. The hippos stay under water during the day so they can only be spotted during the night or in the evening.

In February 2004, a young hippo calf named Hugo or Houdini escaped from Rondevlei after it was bullied by an older dominant male and was on the run for 10 months until it was caught in December and moved to an Eastern Cape private reserve.

== History ==
The reserve was established in 1952 in cooperation with the Cape Divisional Council (now Cape Metropolitan Council), when the area was still used by locals to graze horses and cattle, for woodcutting and flower picking. Originally it consisted of the vlei and about 1 square kilometre (0.39 sq mi) of land, which was extended in 1963 and 1987 by adding dunes and seasonal wetlands to the south of the vlei to the reserve. To prevent flooding of the built-up areas, which contained then mainly sub-economic housing, a dam at the south-eastern end of the vlei was built to permanently lower the level of Rondevlei. The management of the reserve was taken over by the South Peninsula Municipality in 1997 and it is now part of the City of Cape Town.

== Facilities ==
The facilities in the reserve include an about 1 km (0.62 mi) long waterside trail along the shoreline with six bird hides and two large wooden observation towers, a terrarium and aquarium, as well as the Leonard Gill museum and an environmental education centre with lecture theater and resource centre. Besides birdwatching visitors are offered guided tours, boat cruises, conference facilities and secluded overnight accommodation within the reserve which are organized by a community-based company, Imvubu Nature Tours, which was established in 2002 with the use of poverty relief funds, made available by the Department of Environmental Affairs and Tourism.

== See also ==
- Boulders Beach
- Cape Flats Dune Strandveld
- Cape Flats Sand Fynbos
- Cape Lowland Freshwater Wetland
- Kirstenbosch National Botanical Garden
