= Uitkamp Wetlands =

Wetland reserve in Durbanville in the Western Cape

Uitkamp Wetland Nature Reserve
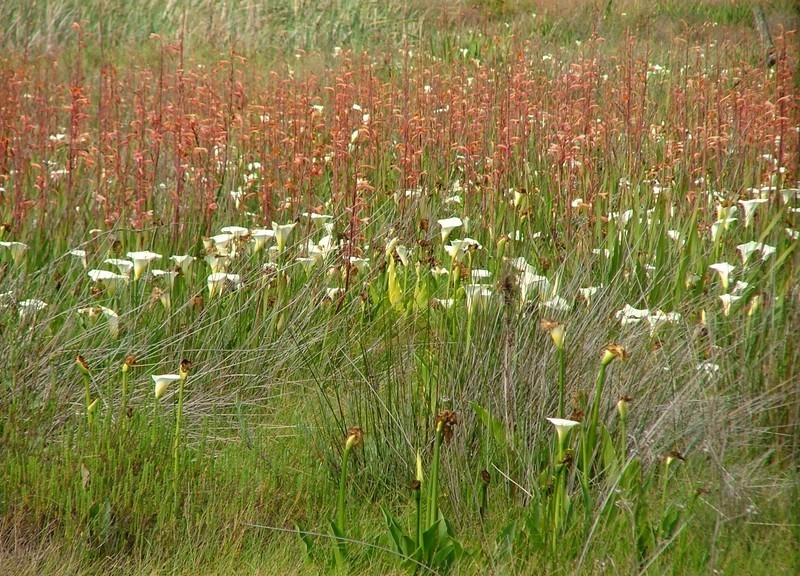
- Watsonias and Arum lilies growing in the Uitkamp wetlands
- Location: Durbanville, South Africa
- Coordinates: 33.8159°S 18.6406°E
- Area: 32 ha (79 acres)
- Established: 2001
- Website: Uitkamp Wetland Nature Reserve
- Uitkamp Wetlands (South Africa) Uitkamp Wetlands (Western Cape)

Uitkamp Wetland Nature Reserve is a 32-hectare (79-acre) wetland reserve located in Durbanville in the Western Cape province of South Africa .

A wetland valley that was proclaimed a nature reserve in 2001, this park lies within a region of Swartland Shale Renosterveld.

== Biodiversity ==
The reserve consists of five disjointed areas separated by roadways. It protects over 279 species of plants, of which 30 are threatened and many are very rare. More common pink watsonia and arum lily cover the wetland in the spring, along with restios, orchids, sundews and other colourful flowers.

A major threat to the wetlands is from the invasive alien plants Port Jackson (Acacia saligna) and Kikuyu grass (Pennisetum clandestinum); 15 invasive plant species have been recorded.

=== Vegetation ===
The most abundant aquatic plant species are Typha capensis (which is an indigenous species in this environment) and Juncus effusus.

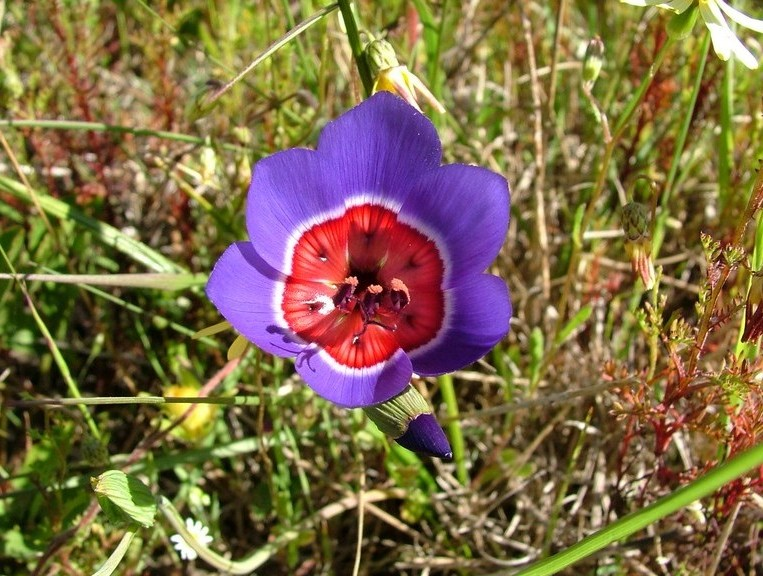
Geissorhiza radians flower growing in Swartland Shale Renosterveld at Uitkamp reserve.

=== Mammals ===
Animals found within the confines of the reserve are mostly smaller and nocturnal. Bucks found are the Common duiker, Steenbok and Cape grysbok. Large grey mongoose is the top predator within the reserve. Caracal and the Cape fox are thought to visit occasionally. Other mammals include:

- Bat-eared fox
- Cape grey mongoose
- Yellow mongoose
- Marsh mongoose
- Cape porcupine
- Striped field mouse
- African pygmy mouse
- Forest shrew

=== Birds ===
There are 67 species of birds found within the reserve.

=== Reptiles ===
There are 13 species of reptile found within the reserve; 4 lizard, 6 snake, and 3 tortoise species. The most common lizard species is the Ocellated gecko. Some of the snake species are:

- Common slug eater
- Mole snake
- Red-lipped / Herald snake

Tortoises include the Marsh terrapin and the Parrot-beaked tortoise.

=== Amphibians ===
One species of amphibian has been found in the reserve, the Clicking stream frog.

=== Invertebrates ===
The Cape autumn widow is found here.

== See also ==
- Biodiversity of Cape Town
- List of nature reserves in Cape Town
- Swartland Shale Renosterveld
- Cape Lowland Freshwater Wetland
- Durbanville Nature Reserve
