= Lower Silvermine River Wetlands =

Nature reserve on the Cape Peninsula, in Cape Town, South Africa

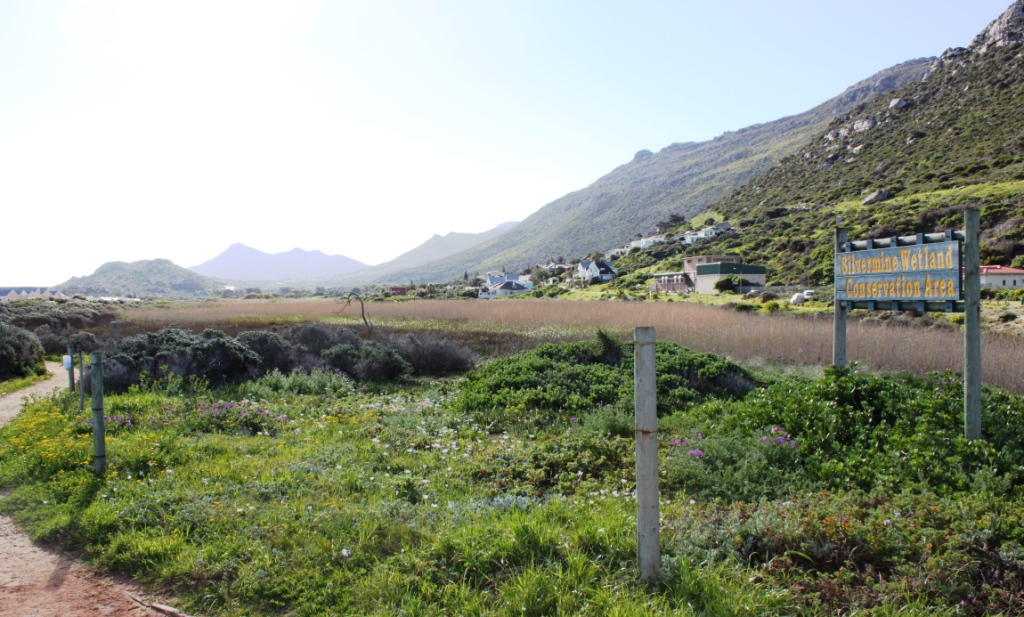
The wetlands of the Lower Silvermine River.

Lower Silvermine Wetlands is a nature reserve on the Cape Peninsula, in Cape Town, South Africa.

This reserve protects a section of Hangklip Sand Fynbos as well as the indigenous Cape wetlands of the Silvermine River. It was rehabilitated due to local flooding problems, and the original indigenous species are being reintroduced, replacing the problematic alien vegetation that is being cleared.

This area is a breeding ground for a great many amphibians, including the endangered Western Leopard Toad, the Arum Lily Frog, the Cape River Frog and the Clicking Stream Frog. Other species such as the Cape Platanna seem to be locally extinct. There are several small mammal species here too, such as porcupine, otter, grysbock and mongoose. About 50 bird species have been recorded here, though some are no longer seen in the area. Alien vegetation is still a threat, as is the excessive proliferation of the indigenous Bulrush (Typha) which is caused by unnatural quantities of minerals and nutrients being washed into the wetland from urban storm water.

== See also ==
- Biodiversity of Cape Town
- List of nature reserves in Cape Town
- Hangklip Sand Fynbos
- Cape Lowland Freshwater Wetland
