= Durbanville Nature Reserve =

Piece of protected land next to the Durbanville Racecourse

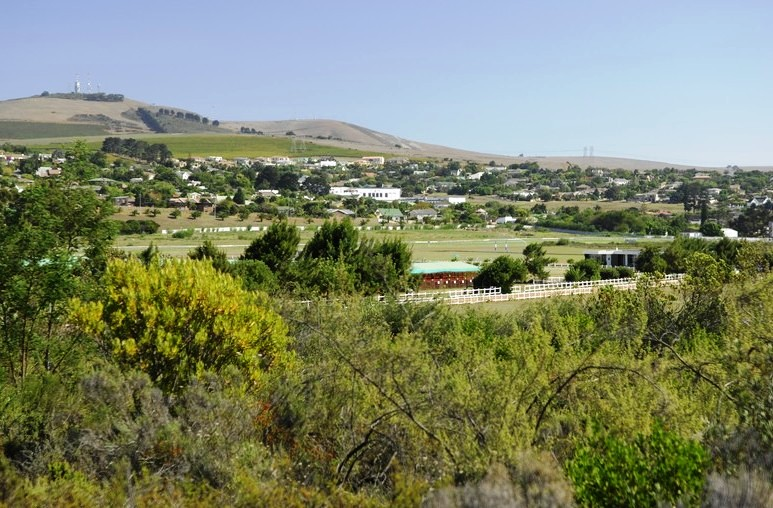
- Durbanville Nature Reserve with the racecourse and outlying suburbs in the background
- Map of Greater Cape Town
- Location: Durbanville, South Africa
- Coordinates: 33.84082°S 18.64352°E
- Area: 6 hectares (15 acres)
- Established: 1966
- Website: Durbanville Nature Reserve
- Durbanville Nature Reserve (South Africa) Durbanville Nature Reserve (Western Cape)

Durbanville Nature Reserve is a 6-hectare (15-acre) piece of protected land, located next to the Hollywoodbets Durbanville Racecourse in the Western Cape, South Africa.

== Biodiversity ==
This small nature reserve is located on the border between two critically endangered vegetation types: Swartland Shale Renosterveld and Cape Flats Sand Fynbos. It was proclaimed in 1966 after Aristea lugens, a rare species of plant, was discovered here. The invasive alien vegetation was then cleared and the indigenous landscape was restored. The park is now home to around 241 species of plant - three of which exist only in Cape Town and ten of which are threatened with extinction. It is also a natural habitat for wild animals such as the angulate tortoise, the small grey mongoose and the endangered Cape rain frog.

=== Amphibians ===
Three species of amphibian have been found in the reserve, Cape sand frog, the vulnerable Cape rain frog, and the Clicking stream frog.

=== Birds ===
There are 104 species of birds found within the reserve; of which 3 are endemic to the fynbos: Cape sugarbird, Cape canary and the Orange- breasted sunbird.

=== Reptiles ===
Eight species of reptile occur within the reserve; 5 species of snake, 1 lizard and 2 tortoise species. The Cape dwarf chameleon is the one species of lizard. Snakes found are:

- Aurora house snake
- Common egg-eater
- Mole snake
- Red lipped snake

Tortoises are the angulate tortoise, and the introduced leopard tortoise.

=== Vegetation ===
Some of the species of plant that occur within the reserve and are in the Red List of South African Plants:

- Aristea lugens
- Cliffortia hirta
- Gladiolus recurvus
- Serruria brownii

== See also ==
- Biodiversity of Cape Town – Diversity of the natural environment of Cape Town
- List of nature reserves in Cape Town
- Cape Flats Sand Fynbos – Vegetation type endemic to the City of Cape Town
- Swartland Shale Renosterveld – Vegetation type endemic to the Western Cape, South Africa
