= Die Oog Conservation Area =

Nature reserve in Cape Town, South Africa

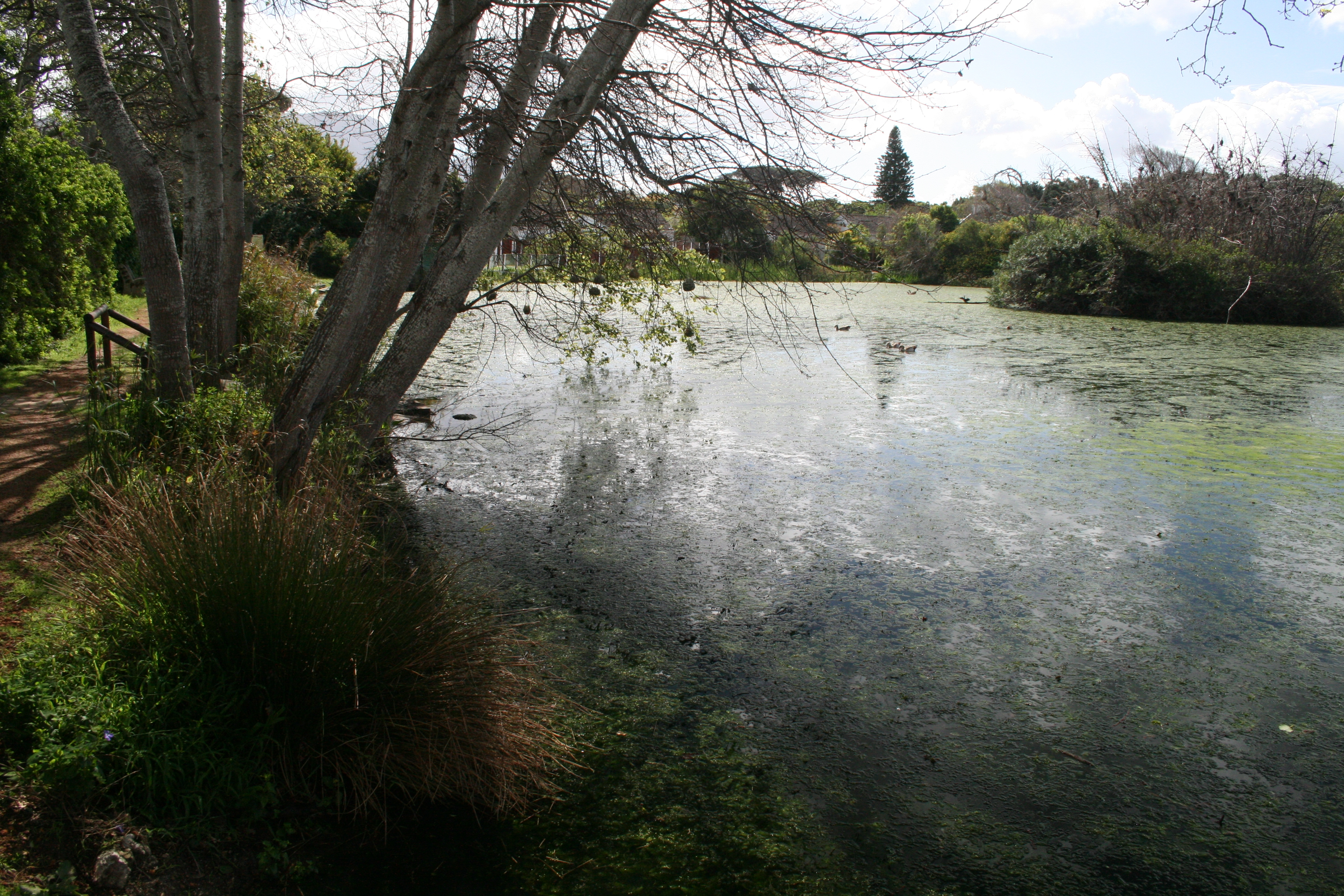

- Location within Cape Town
- Location: Cape Town, South Africa
- Coordinates: 34°02′53″S 18°26′51″E
- Area: 1.2 ha (3.0 acres)
- Website: dieoog.org.za

Die Oog Conservation Area is a tiny 1.2-hectare (3.0-acre) nature reserve within the city of Cape Town, South Africa.

It is located in the suburb of Bergvliet in the southern portion of Cape Town and includes a lake with an artificial island, a wetland, a garden and a small area of indigenous and endangered Peninsula Granite Fynbos. The recreational area has been planted with indigenous trees such as the unique and striking Silvertree (Leucadendron argenteum), and the wetland is one of the few remaining breeding grounds of the endangered Western Leopard Toad.

== See also ==
- Biodiversity of Cape Town
- List of nature reserves in Cape Town
- Western Leopard Toad
- Peninsula Granite Fynbos
- Cape Lowland Freshwater Wetland
