= Glencairn Wetland =

Nature reserve in South Africa

- Location within Cape Town
- Location: Cape Town, South Africa
- Coordinates: 34°09′25″S 18°25′40″E
- Area: 20 ha (49 acres)

Glencairn Wetland is a small 20-hectare (49-acre) reserve on the Cape Peninsula, in the southern areas of Greater Cape Town, South Africa.

Located next to the village of Glencairn, this reserve protects the indigenous Cape wetland of the lower Else River, with its abundance of plant and animal life. The wetland is managed by the City of Cape Town with local volunteers, and it now includes a figure-of-eight system of footpaths, with hiking trails and stepping stones to cross waterways.

Several bird species can be seen here and this is a popular site for fishing and school excursions. The mammal life, including otter, mongoose and porcupine, is mostly nocturnal and rarely seen. Small reptiles such as the angulate tortoise, the marsh terrapin and a range of snakes and lizards are also found here. Amphibian life includes a wide range of species such as the endangered western leopard toad, the arum lily frog, the Cape river frog and the clicking stream frog.

== See also ==
- Biodiversity of Cape Town
- List of nature reserves in Cape Town
- Cape Lowland Freshwater Wetland
