= Edith Stephens Wetland Park =

Nature reserve

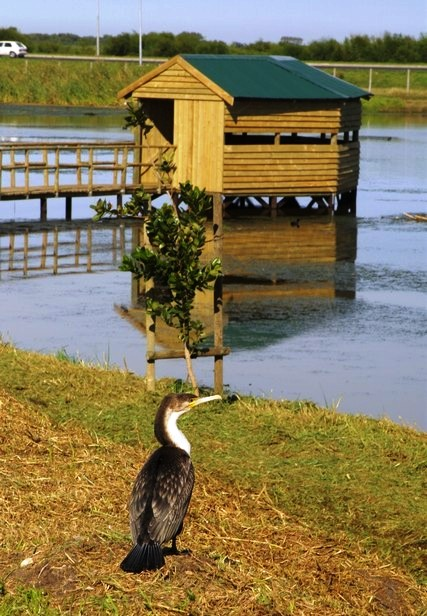
- A bird hide at the Edith Stephens wetlands

- Location within Cape Town
- Location: Cape Town, South Africa
- Coordinates: 34.00147°S 18.55183°E
- Area: 39 ha (96 acres)

Edith Stephens Wetland Park is a nature reserve for wetlands and fynbos, located in the city of Cape Town, South Africa.

The park consists of a large seasonal wetland, with surrounding stretches of Cape Flats Sand Fynbos and Cape Flats Dune Strandveld vegetation. Seven Red Data plant species have been recorded here as well as nearly a hundred species of bird, several amphibians (including a population of endangered Western Leopard Toad), reptiles and mammals. The 39-hectare (96-acre) park was originally built around a smaller piece of land that was donated by the botanist Edith Layard Stephens. She intended it to preserve the rare Isoetes capensis plant, which exists nowhere else on Earth. After subsequent additions to take it to its present size, the resulting park was named after her.

The park is run by the City of Cape Town in partnership with the local community. It now has an Environmental Education Centre, boardwalk trails, a picnic area, a bird hide and a garden of medicinal plants.

== See also ==
- Biodiversity of Cape Town
- List of nature reserves in Cape Town
- Cape Flats Sand Fynbos
- Cape Flats Dune Strandveld
- Cape Lowland Freshwater Wetland
