= Chimanimani (disambiguation) =

Chimanimani is a town in Manicaland Province, Zimbabwe.

Chimanimani may also refer to:

- Chimanimani District, a district in Manicaland Province, eastern Zimbabwe
- Chimanimani Mountains, a mountain range on the border of Zimbabwe and Mozambique
- Chimanimani National Park (Mozambique), a national park in Manica Province close the border with Zimbabwe
- Chimanimani East, a constituency represented in the National Assembly of the Parliament of Zimbabwe
- Chimanimani stream frog (Strongylopus rhodesianus), a species of frog in the family Pyxicephalidae found in Zimbabwe and Mozambique
