= Glencairn =

Glencairn may refer to:

== Object ==
- The Scottish version of a cairn, being a tombstone erected on the highest mountain peaks to mark the grave sites and honour fallen Scottish warriors

== Places ==
=== Australia ===
- Glencairn, Coburg, a heritage-listed house in Melbourne, Victoria

=== Canada ===
- Glencairn, Manitoba, a community in the Municipality of McCreary
- Glencairn, Ontario, a community in the Adjala–Tosorontio township
- Glencairn (TTC), a subway station in Toronto
- Glencairn, Regina, a community located on the east side of Regina, Saskatchewan

=== Ireland ===
- Glencairn, Belfast, an electoral ward in Belfast, Northern Ireland
- Glencairn, Dumfries and Galloway, an ecclesiastical and civil parish in Dumfries and Galloway, Scotland
- Glencairn House in Dublin, Ireland, the official residence of the British ambassador to Ireland.
- Glencairn, a townland in County Waterford in Ireland, which is home to Glencairn Abbey

=== Scotland ===
- Glencairn Aisle, at Kilmaurs, East Ayrshire, burial crypt of the Cunningham Earls of Glencairn and their family members

=== South Africa ===
- Glencairn, Cape Town, a suburb near Simonstown (the old Royal Navy Base), Cape Town, South Africa
- Glencairn Wetland, a small reserve on the Cape Peninsula, in the southern areas of Cape Town, South Africa

=== United States ===
- Glencairn (Greensboro, Alabama), or John Erwin House, on the National Register of Historic Places
- Glencairn (Chance, Virginia), a historic plantation house in Essex County, Virginia
- Glencairn Museum, a museum of religious history in Pennsylvania

== People ==
- Earl of Glencairn, a Scottish Peerage title held by Clan Cunningham chief at Finlaystone House until 1796
- Glencairn Balfour Paul (1917–2008), CMG (September 23, 1917 – July 2, 2008) was the British ambassador to Iraq, Jordan and Tunisia before becoming an academic at Exeter University

== Other uses ==
- Cunningham Broadcasting, a Sinclair Broadcasting subsidiary formerly known as Glencairn
- Glencairn whisky glass, a glass designed for whisky drinking
- Rutherglen Glencairn F.C., a Scottish football club colloquially known as Glencairn
- Glencairn Elementary School
- Glencairn Primary School, based at New Street in Stevenston, North Ayrshire. It serves the town of Stevenston with a nursery for children aged 4 and primary school for children from the ages of 5 to 11
- SS Glencairn
