= Mamre (disambiguation) =

Mamre may refer to the following places:

- Mamre, an ancient shrine focused on a holy tree, north of Hebron
  - Oak of Mamre an ancient tree in the grounds of the Russian Orthodox Monastery of the Holy Trinity, Hebron
- Mamre, St Marys, New South Wales, Australia
- Mamre, Western Cape, South Africa
  - Mamre Nature Garden
- Mamre Township, Kandiyohi County, Minnesota, United States
