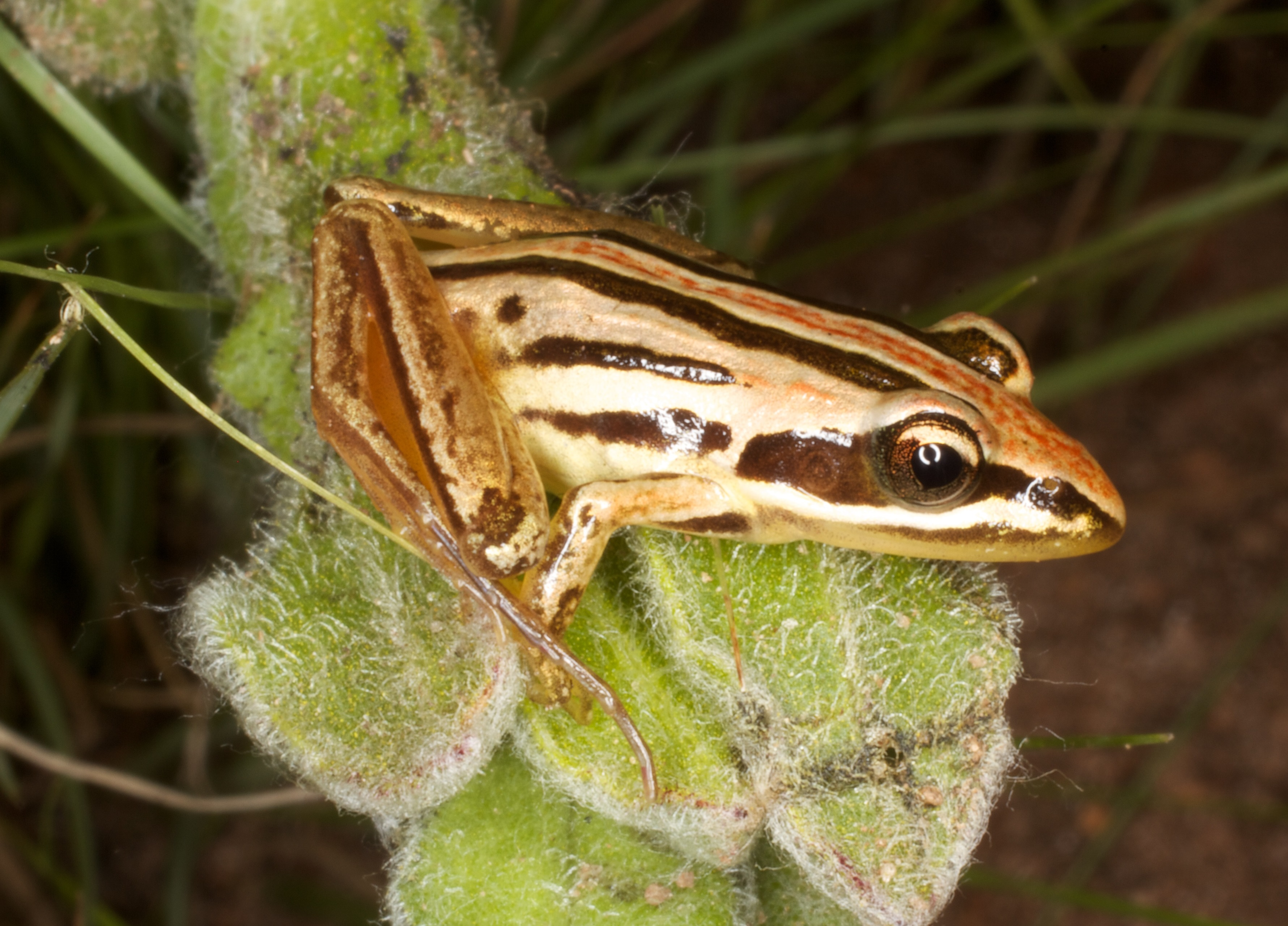

Conservation status
- Least Concern (IUCN 3.1)

Scientific classification
- Kingdom: Animalia
- Phylum: Chordata
- Class: Amphibia
- Order: Anura
- Family: Pyxicephalidae
- Genus: Strongylopus
- Species: S. fasciatus

Binomial name
- Strongylopus fasciatus (Smith, 1849)

Synonyms
- Rana fasciata Smith, 1849

= Strongylopus fasciatus =

Striped stream frog

Species of frog

Strongylopus fasciatus, also known as the striped stream frog, striped grass frog, striped rana, striped long-toed frog or long-toed grass frog is a species of frog in the family Pyxicephalidae. It is endemic to southern Africa.

== Description ==
Strongylopus fasciatus is a small, long legged frog with a pointed snout. Its distinguishing features are the parallel yellow and brown longitudinal stripes along its back, with longitudinal dark stripes along its legs. It has a white belly and the males have yellow throats. The pupils are horizontal. It also has very long toes and, when crouched, the fourth toe on the rear feet extends past the front feet.

=== Voice ===
The call of Strongylopus fasciatus is a sharp "pip" which can be made singly or in a series of three or four calls.

== Distribution ==
Strongylopus fasciatus occurs the Western Cape Province east through eastern South Africa to borders of Lesotho and Eswatini, then north into Zimbabwe, western Mozambique and south-western Zambia, its presence in Botswana has yet to be confirmed. In the Highveld of central South Africa it appears to be localised but extends as far west as the eastern Free State.

== Habitat ==
Strongylopus fasciatuscan be found in a variety of habitats from grassland to forest in areas with an annual rainfall of more than 500mm and is rarely found far from permanent water. In the montane grasslands of South Africa the preferred breeding habitat is grassy streamsides, reed beds along the margins of rivers and vleis. It is tolerant of human disturbance and can be found in irrigation canals, reservoirs, parks and gardens.

== Habits ==
Strongylopus fasciatus breeds mainly in the southern winter, and breeding seems to be triggered by the dropping in temperature. The males' first calls are usually recorded in mid- to late February, although they have been heard as early as January. The peak calling period appears to be in March, April and May, and calling stops by November. In summer, sporadic calling may be set off by a cold front moving in from the south. Males call from the water's edge or from elevated positions in reeds and grass. Where they are less common the males may be scattered and call individually but where they are abundant they may form choruses and the males be separated by only a few centimetres.

The female lays the eggs singly in shallow water on the margins of grassy waterbodies. The eggs are soon camouflaged as debris sticks to them, making them difficult to see. Clutch size has not been recorded but comparisons with related species suggest that Strongylopus fasciatus does not lay large clutches. The tadpoles metamorphose into froglets after 4–5 months.

== Conservation ==
Strongylopus fasciatus is a widespread and common species and is not threatened. However, specimens of this species caught in Kenton on Sea in 2004 tested positive for the fungus that causes chytridiomycosis.
