= List of nature reserves in Cape Town =

The City of Cape Town, South Africa has numerous nature reserves within the city limits.

== City of Cape Town ==
The City of Cape Town manages the following nature reserves in the Cape Town metropolitan area:

=== Temp ===
North region

- Mamre Nature Garden – Nature reserve in Cape Town, South Africa
- Witzands Aquifer Conservation Area – Protected natural area in Cape Town, South Africa
- Blaauwberg Conservation Area – Nature reserve in Cape Town, South Africa
- Diep River Fynbos Corridor – Nature reserve in South Africa
- Milnerton Racecourse Nature Reserve – Lowland conservation area in the City of Cape Town, South Africa
- Rietvlei Wetland Reserve – Nature reserve in Table View, Western Cape, South Africa.
- Zoarvlei Wetlands – Wetland reserve of about in the city of Cape Town, South Africa

South region

- Raapenberg Bird Sanctuary – Protected area in Cape Town, on the Liesbeek river
- Rondebosch Common – Conservation area in Cape Town
- Kenilworth Racecourse Conservation Area – Nature reserve in Cape Town, South Africa
- Rondevlei Nature Reserve – Protected wetlands in Cape Town, South Africa
- Zeekoevlei Nature Reserve – Freshwater lake on the Cape Flats in Cape Town
- Zandvlei Estuary Nature Reserve – Nature reserve and recreational area in Muizenberg, South Africa
- De Hel Nature Area – Nature reserve by Cape Town, South Africa
- Meadowridge Common – Reserve in Cape Town, South Africa
- Die Oog Conservation Area – Nature reserve in Cape Town, South Africa
- Lower Silvermine River Wetlands – Nature reserve on the Cape Peninsula, in Cape Town, South Africa
- Glencairn Wetland – Nature reserve in South Africa
- Edith Stephens Wetland Park – Nature reserve

Central region

- Durbanville Nature Reserve – Piece of protected land next to the Durbanville Racecourse
- Tygerberg Nature Reserve – Nature reserve in Cape Town, South Africa
- Bracken Nature Reserve – Protected land in Brackenfell in the Western Cape, South Africa
- Uitkamp Wetlands – Wetland reserve in Durbanville in the Western Cape

East region

- Wolfgat Nature Reserve – Coastal nature reserve in Mitchells Plain, Cape Town, South Africa
- Macassar Dunes Conservation Area – Coastal nature reserve in Macassar, Cape Town, South Africa
- Helderberg Nature Reserve – Nature reserve in Cape Town, South Africa
- Silwerboomkloof Natural Heritage Site – Protected valley near the Helderberg Nature Reserve, in Somerset West,
- Lourens River Protected Natural Environment – Section of protected land along the Lourens River in the Helderberg region, South Africa.
- Dick Dent Bird Sanctuary – Reserve in Somerset West, South Africa
- Harmony Flats Nature Reserve – Nature reserve in Cape Town, South Africa
- Kogelberg Nature Reserve – Protected area in the Western Cape province of South Africa

== CapeNature ==
CapeNature, the Western Cape provincial conservation authority, manages Driftsands Nature Reserve on the Cape Flats, and the eastern part of the Kogelberg Nature Reserve. A small area of the Hottentots-Holland Nature Reserve also falls within the city limits of Cape Town.

== South African National Parks (SANParks) ==
South African National Parks (SANParks) manages the following nature reserve in Cape Town:

- Table Mountain National Park

== Eskom ==
Eskom manages the following nature reserve in Cape Town:

- Koeberg Nature Reserve

== University of the Western Cape (UWC) ==
The University of the Western Cape (UWC) manages the following nature reserve in Cape Town:

- Cape Flats Nature Reserve

== See also ==
- Biodiversity of Cape Town – Diversity of the natural environment of Cape Town
