= Namaqua stream frog =

Conservation status
- Least Concern (IUCN 3.1)

Scientific classification
- Kingdom: Animalia
- Phylum: Chordata
- Class: Amphibia
- Order: Anura
- Family: Pyxicephalidae
- Genus: Strongylopus
- Species: S. springbokensis

Binomial name
- Strongylopus springbokensis Channing, 1986

Species of amphibian

The Namaqua stream frog (Strongylopus springbokensis) is a species of frog in the family Pyxicephalidae found in South Africa and possibly Namibia. Its natural habitats are subtropical or tropical dry shrubland, Mediterranean-type shrubby vegetation, rivers, freshwater marshes, and intermittent freshwater marshes. It is threatened by habitat loss.
