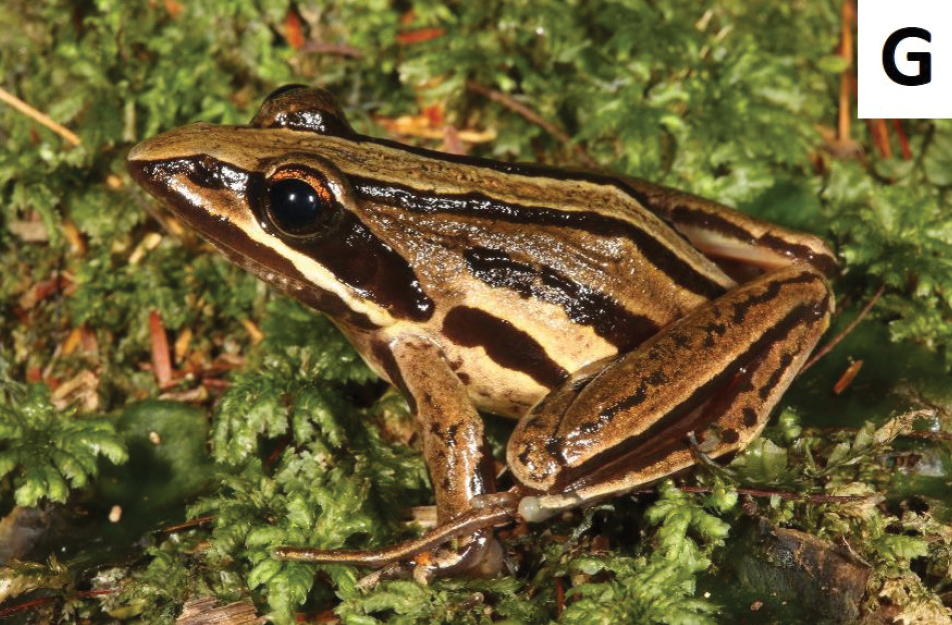

Conservation status
- Least Concern (IUCN 3.1)

Scientific classification
- Kingdom: Animalia
- Phylum: Chordata
- Class: Amphibia
- Order: Anura
- Family: Pyxicephalidae
- Genus: Strongylopus
- Species: S. fuelleborni

Binomial name
- Strongylopus fuelleborni (Nieden, 1911)

Synonyms
- Rana fülleborni Nieden, 1911 "1910"

= Fuelleborn's stream frog =

Species of amphibian

Fuelleborn's stream frog or long-toed grass frog (Strongylopus fuelleborni) is a species of frog in the family Pyxicephalidae. It is found in the mountains of Malawi, Tanzania, and northeastern Zambia. Its natural habitats are montane grasslands at elevations of 1,500–3,000 m (4,900–9,800 ft) above sea level. Outside the breeding season, it can be found far from water. During the breeding season, males call from flooded grass. The egg clusters are laid just above streams, underneath dense vegetation. Tadpoles develop in the streams.

Strongylopus fuelleborni is a common species, but its montane grassland habitats are threatened in parts of its range because of afforestation, overgrazing, agriculture, human settlement, and spread invasive trees such as eucalyptus. These changes can lead to siltation of the breeding streams. The species is known from a few protected areas and probably occurs in several others.
