= Degen's water snake =

Conservation status
- Least Concern (IUCN 3.1)

Scientific classification
- Kingdom: Animalia
- Phylum: Chordata
- Class: Reptilia
- Order: Squamata
- Suborder: Serpentes
- Family: Colubridae
- Genus: Crotaphopeltis
- Species: C. degeni

Binomial name
- Crotaphopeltis degeni (Boulenger, 1906)

Synonyms
- Leptodira degeni Boulenger, 1906; Crotaphopeltis degeni — Barbour & Amaral, 1927

Species of snake

Degen's water snake (Crotaphopeltis degeni), also known commonly as Degen's herald snake and the yellow-flanked snake, is a species of snake in the family Colubridae. The species is native to Sub-Saharan Africa.

== Etymology ==
The specific name, degeni, is in honor of Swiss-born Edward J. E. Degen (1852–1922), who collected natural history specimens in Africa, and later worked as a taxidermist at the British Museum (Natural History).

== Geographic range ==
C. degeni is found in Cameroon, Central African Republic, Ethiopia, Kenya, South Sudan, Tanzania, and Uganda.

== Habitat ==
The preferred natural habitats of C. degeni are mesic savanna and freshwater wetlands, at altitudes of 500–2,700 m (1,600–8,900 ft).

== Behavior ==
C. degeni is semiaquatic and nocturnal. It swims well, and during the day it hides in holes in the ground and in vegetation near water.

== Diet ==
C. degeni preys upon amphibians and perhaps also upon small fishes.

== Reproduction ==
C. degeni is oviparous. Clutch size is six eggs.
