= Crotaphopeltis tornieri =

Conservation status
- Least Concern (IUCN 3.1)

Scientific classification
- Kingdom: Animalia
- Phylum: Chordata
- Class: Reptilia
- Order: Squamata
- Suborder: Serpentes
- Family: Colubridae
- Genus: Crotaphopeltis
- Species: C. tornieri

Binomial name
- Crotaphopeltis tornieri (F. Werner, 1908)

Synonyms
- Leptodira tornieri F. Werner, 1908; Leptodeira tornieri — Barbour & Amaral, 1927; Crotaphopeltis hotamboeia tornieri — Barbour & Loveridge, 1928; Crotaphopeltis tornieri — Broadley, 1968; Crotaphopeltis tornieri — Wallach et al., 2014

Species of snake

Crotaphopeltis tornieri, also known commonly as Tornier's cat snake and Werner's cat snake, is a species of snake in the family Colubridae. The species is endemic to Africa.

== Etymology ==
The specific name, tornieri, is in honor of German zoologist Gustav Tornier.

== Geographic range ==
C. tornieri is found in Malawi, Tanzania and Kenya.

== Habitat ==
The preferred natural habitat of C. tornieri is forest, at altitudes of 200–1,900 m (660–6,230 ft).

== Reproduction ==
C. tornieri is oviparous.
