= Crotaphopeltis braestrupi =

Conservation status
- Least Concern (IUCN 3.1)

Scientific classification
- Kingdom: Animalia
- Phylum: Chordata
- Class: Reptilia
- Order: Squamata
- Suborder: Serpentes
- Family: Colubridae
- Genus: Crotaphopeltis
- Species: C. braestrupi

Binomial name
- Crotaphopeltis braestrupi Rasmussen, 1985

Species of snake

Crotaphopeltis braestrupi is a species of snake in the family Colubridae. The species is endemic to East Africa.

== Etymology ==
The specific name, braestrupi, is in honor of Frits Wimpffen Braestrup (1906–1999), who was curator of the zoological museum of the University of Copenhagen.

== Geographic range ==
C. braestrupi is found in eastern Kenya and southeastern Somalia, on the coastal plain.

== Habitat ==
The preferred natural habitats of C. braestrupi are freshwater wetlands, shrubland, savanna, and forest, at altitudes from sea level to 600 m (2,000 ft).

== Behavior ==
C. braestrupi is terrestrial and nocturnal.

== Diet ==
C. braestrupi preys upon amphibians.

== Reproduction ==
C. braestrupi is oviparous.
