= Meadowridge Common =

Reserve in Cape Town, South Africa

- Location within Cape Town
- Location: Cape Town, South Africa
- Coordinates: 34°02′15″S 18°27′10″E
- Area: 8 ha (20 acres)

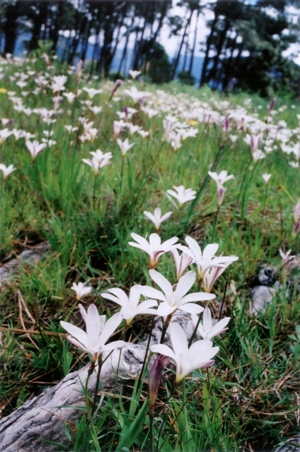
Sparaxis bulbifera growing in Cape Flats Sand Fynbos on Meadowridge Common.

Meadowridge Common is an 8-hectare (20-acre) reserve in the Meadowridge suburb of Cape Town, South Africa, which preserves a fragment of critically endangered Cape Flats Sand Fynbos vegetation.

The preserve contains over a hundred plant species, including 4 that are endangered. The endangered Cape Rain Frog (Breviceps gibbosus) is one of the many small animals that have been seen here. In spring, the park becomes very colourful as the indigenous fynbos bursts into flower.

This small reserve is managed by the City of Cape Town, but faces considerable challenges. Not least of which are invasive alien plants such as Pine trees and Kikuyu grass. The reserve’s small size and isolation from other natural areas also make species extinction a much greater risk.

== See also ==
- Biodiversity of Cape Town
- List of nature reserves in Cape Town
- Cape Flats Sand Fynbos
