= Hangklip Sand Fynbos =

Vegetation type endemic to South Africa

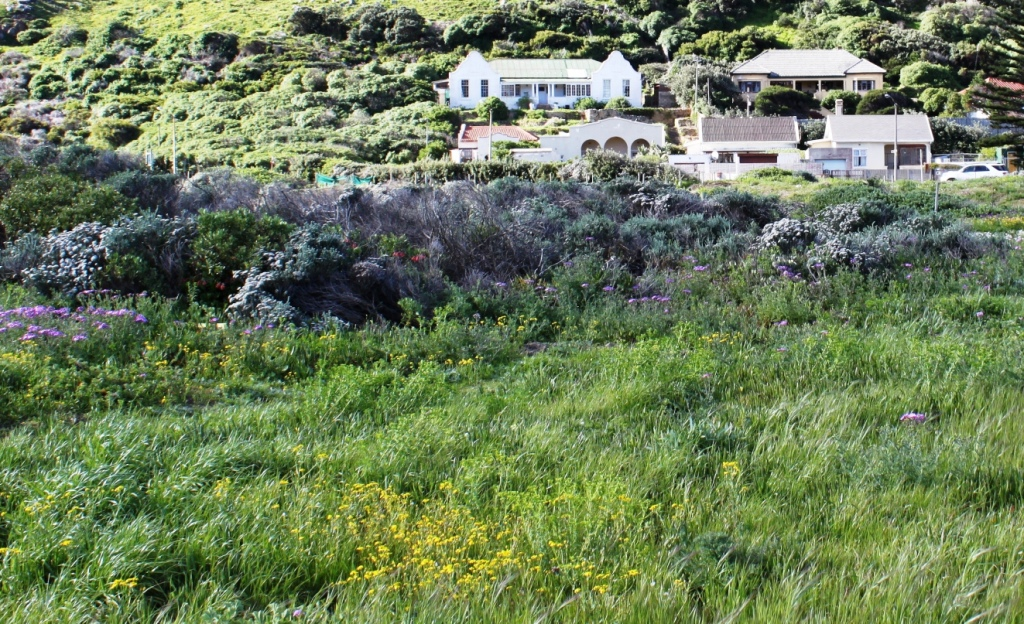
Surviving remnant of Hangklip Sand Fynbos at Lower Silvermine River Wetlands, Cape Town.

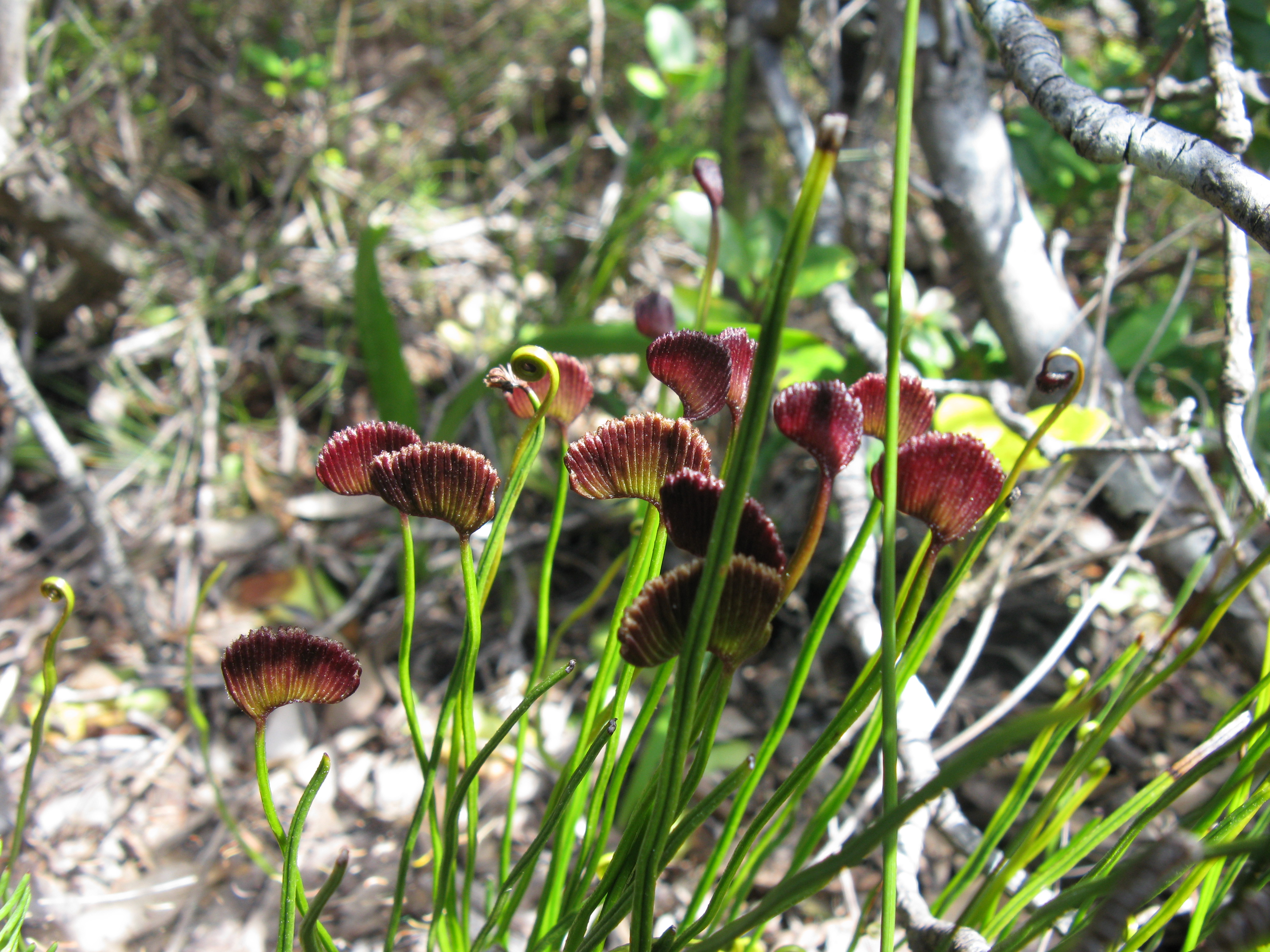
Schizaea pectinata, in Hangklip Sand Fynbos

Hangklip Sand Fynbos is an endangered vegetation type that occurs in the southern coastal portion of the Western Cape, South Africa.

This particular fynbos ecosystem naturally occurs along the southern coast of the Western Cape, South Africa, between Agulhas and Pringle Bay. There is also an isolated remnant of it far to the west in the Fish Hoek Valley on the Cape Peninsula, Cape Town.

== See also ==
- Biodiversity of Cape Town
- Fish Hoek Valley
- Cape Flats Sand Fynbos
- Atlantis Sand Fynbos
- Cape Floristic Region
- Index: Fynbos - habitats and species.
