= Crotaphopeltis barotseensis =

Conservation status
- Least Concern (IUCN 3.1)

Scientific classification
- Kingdom: Animalia
- Phylum: Chordata
- Class: Reptilia
- Order: Squamata
- Suborder: Serpentes
- Family: Colubridae
- Genus: Crotaphopeltis
- Species: C. barotseensis

Binomial name
- Crotaphopeltis barotseensis Broadley, 1968

Species of snake

Crotaphopeltis barotseensis, the Barotse water snake, is a species of snake of the family Colubridae.

== Geographic range and habitat ==
The snake is found in Angola, Botswana and Zambia. It is a largely aquatic snake typically associated with Papyrus and Phragmites swamps.
