= Gustav Tornier =

German zoologist and herpetologist

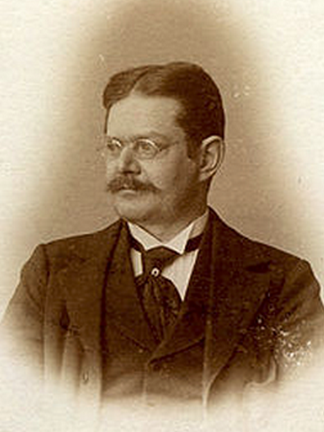
Gustav Tornier, ca. 1905

Gustav Tornier (Dombrowken (today Dąbrowa Chełmińska, Poland), 9 May 1858 – Berlin, 25 April 1938) was a German zoologist and herpetologist.

== Life and career ==
Tornier was born in the Kingdom of Prussia as the eldest child of Gottlob Adolf Tornier, a member of the Prussian landed gentry in Dombrowken, a village near Bromberg (now Bydgoszcz) in West Prussia. His father and mother had both died by 1877, leaving the nineteen-year-old Gustav as the master of a house and estate.

The attached commitments kept him from commencing his university studies until the relatively advanced age of twenty-four. Enrolling at the university of Heidelberg in 1882, Tornier took his time, and he did not receive his doctorate for another ten years. In the meantime he wrote a monograph on evolution in support of Wilhelm Roux, Der Kampf mit der Nahrung ("The battle with/for Food", 1884). In the book, he took an uncompromisingly Darwinist stance, and applied the principles of natural selection and adaptation to the structures and functions of individual organisms.

In 1891 he had already accepted a post as an assistant in the zoological museum of the Friedrich Wilhelm University (now Humboldt University) in Berlin. Initially he occupied himself with preparing anatomical specimens, but from 1893 he also worked in the herpetological department. When its curator, Paul Matschie, took over the mammal collection in 1895, Tornier succeeded him.

In 1902, he became professor of zoology at the university, whilst later also accepting the post of head librarian at the museum (1903), assistant director of the museum (1921), and finally director ad interim of the museum (1922–1923). In addition, he served as a board member of the Berlin Society of Friends of Natural Science (Gesellschaft Naturforschender Freunde zu Berlin) from 1907 to 1924, and as such was closely involved with organizing the Tendaguru Expedition (1910-1912), still the largest dinosaur excavation expedition in history.

Tornier retired in October 1923, and died in 1938 in Berlin. He was interred in the Luisenfriedhof-III in Berlin-Charlottenburg.

== Research ==
Tornier's research interests focused on amphibians and reptiles, developmental anatomy, and systematics. He became the leading authority on the reptilian and amphibian fauna of German East Africa.

=== Diplodocus ===
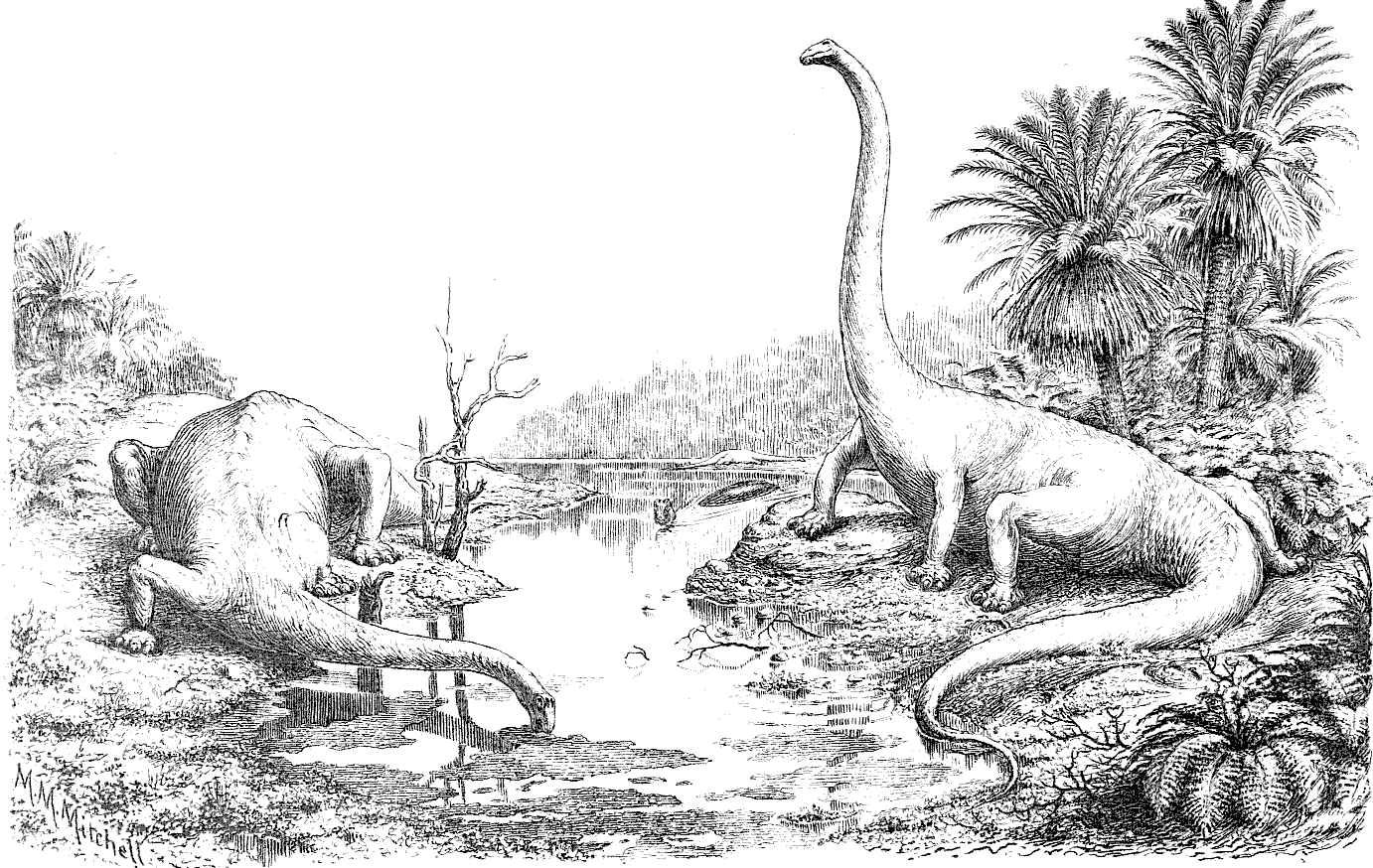
Hay's illustration of Diplodocus (1910)

Perhaps unfairly, Tornier's legacy has mainly been determined by his position in the controversy surrounding the posture of the sauropod dinosaur Diplodocus carnegii. Following the 1899 discovery of the animal in Wyoming, it had traditionally been depicted and mounted in an elephant-like stance. However, In 1909, Oliver P. Hay imagined two Diplodocus, being reptiles after all, with splayed lizard-like limbs on the banks of a river. Hay argued that Diplodocus had a sprawling, lizard-like gait with widely splayed legs. Tornier had arrived at the same conclusion and forcefully supported Hay's argument, arguing that the tail couldn't physically have made the curve down to the ground. To solve this issue, he lowered the entire animal.

The hypothesis, at least as far as the position of the legs was concerned, was contested by W. J. Holland, who maintained that a sprawling Diplodocus would have needed a trench to pull its belly through.

Tornier's acerbic and sometimes sarcastic reply to Holland led to a minor spat, with German authorities (including Kaiser William II himself) coming down on the former's side and even considering re-mounting the Berlin copy of Diplodocus, placed there only a few years before by Holland, in a more "reptilian" fashion. In the end, however, finds of sauropod footprints in the 1930s put Hay and Tornier's theory to rest.

=== Taxonomy ===
Tornier's frog, Litoria tornieri, which is an Australian endemic, was named after him, as was a large sauropod dinosaur found around 1910 in the Tendaguru formations of German East Africa, which was renamedTornieria africanus (Fraas) after the original name Gigantosaurus had been found to be occupied.

Also, Tornier is commemorated in the scientific names of two species of African reptiles: a snake, Crotaphopeltis tornieri; and a tortoise, Malacochersus tornieri.

== Selected publications ==
- (1884). Der Kampf mit der Nahrung: Ein Beitrag zum Darwinismus. Berlin: W. Ißleib.
- (1896). Die Reptilien und Amphibien Ost-Afrikas. Berlin: Reimer.
- (1899). "Neues über Chamaeleons ". Zoolischer Anzeiger 22: 408–414.
- (1899). "Drei Reptilien aus Afrika ". Zoologischer Anzeiger 22 : 258–261.
- (1900). "Beschreibung eines neuen Chamaeleons ". Zoologischer Anzeiger 23: 21–23.
- (1900). "Neue Liste der Crocodilen, Schildkröten und Eidechsen Deutsch-Ost-Afrikas ". Zoologisches Jahrbuch für Systematik 13: 579–681.
- (1901). "Die Reptilien und Amphibien der Deutschen Tiefseeexpedition 1898/99 ". Zoologischer Anzeiger 24: 61–66.
- (1904). "Bau und Betätigung der Kopflappen und Halsluftsäcke bei Chamäleonen ". Zoologisches Jahrbuch für Anatomie 21: 1–40.
- (1908). “Über Eidechseneier, die von Pflanzen durchwachsen sind / Gibt es bei Wiederkäuern und Pferden ein Zehenatavismus? / Über eine albinotische Ringelnatter und ihr Entstehn.” Sitzungsberichte der Gesellschaft Naturforschender Freunde zu Berlin 1908, no. 8: 191–201.
- (1909). "Wie war der Diplodocus carnegii wirklich gebaut?" Sitzungsberichte der Gesellschaft Naturforschender Freunde zu Berlin 1909 (4): 193–209.
- (1909). "Ernstes und lustiges aus Kritiken über meine Diplodocusarbeit / War der Diplodocus Elefantenfüssig?" Sitzungsberichte der Gesellschaft Naturforschender Freunde zu Berlin 1909 (9): 505–556.
- (1909). “War der Diplodocus Elefantenfüssig.” Sitzungsberichte der Gesellschaft Naturforschender Freunde zu Berlin 1909, no. 9: 536–56.
- (1909). “III. Reptilia - Amphibia.” In Die Süßwasserfauna Deutschlands. Vol. 1, edited by August Brauer, 65–107. Jena: Gustav Fischer.
- (1910). “Bemerkungen zu dem vorhergehenden Artikel “ Diplodocus und seine Stellung usw. von Fr. Drevermann.”.” Sitzungsberichte der Gesellschaft Naturforschender Freunde zu Berlin: 402–6.
- (1910). “Über und gegen neue Diplodocus-Arbeiten. Teil I: Gegen O. Abels Rekonstruktion des Diplodocus.” Zeitschrift der Deutschen Geologischen Gesellschaft 62: 536–76.
- (1911). “Ueber die Art, wie aussere Einflüsse den Aufbau des Tieres abändern.” Verhandlungen der deutschen zoologischen Gesellschaft 20/21: 21–91.
- (1912). Biologie und Phylogenie der Rieseneidechsen und ihrer Verwandten (mit Demonstrationen). Berlin: Self-published.
- (1913). “Reptilia: Paläontologie.” In Handwörterbuch Der Naturwissenschaften. 8. Band, Quartärformation - Sekretion, edited by E. Korschelt, 337–76. Jena: Gustav Fischer.
