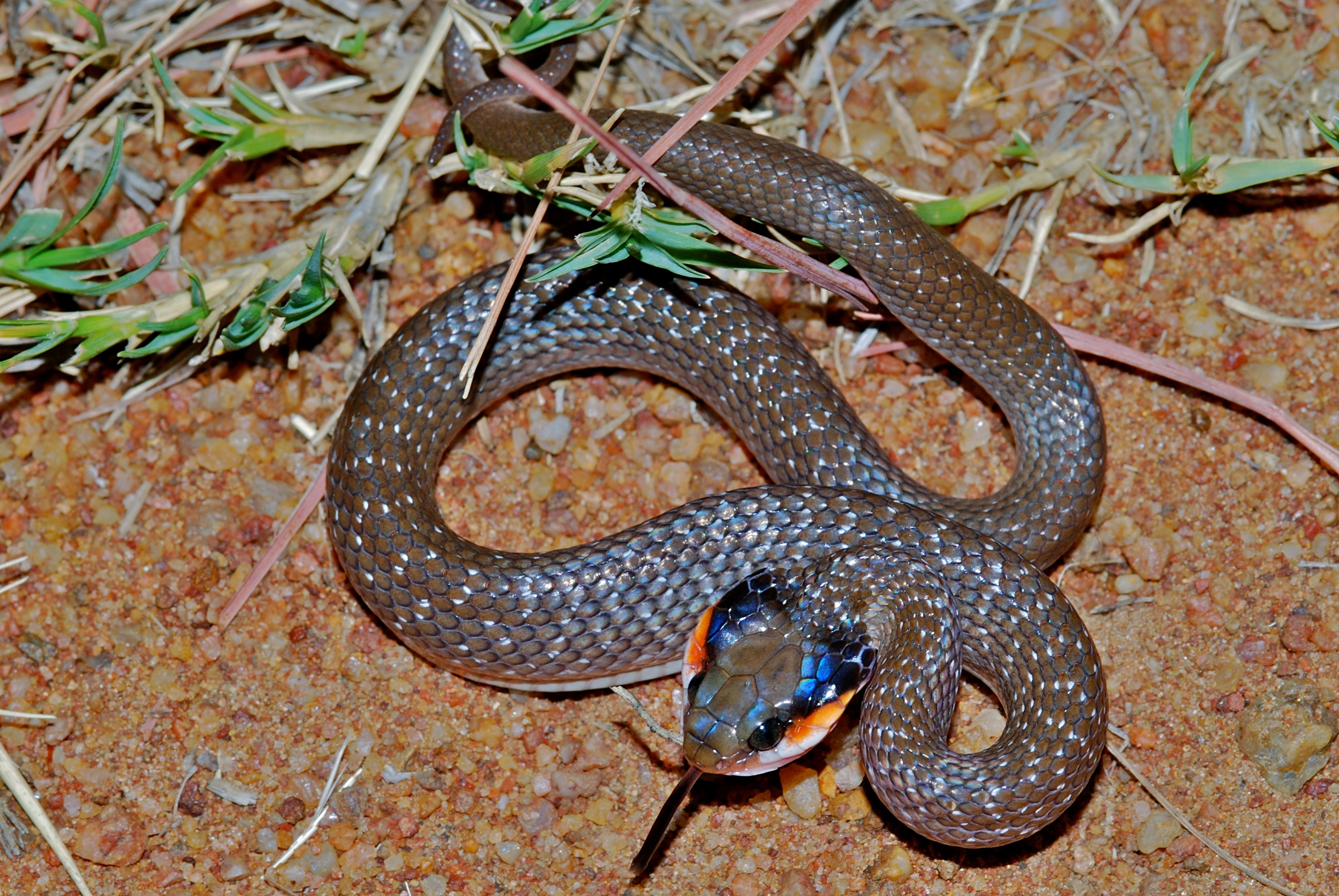
- Crotaphopeltis hotamboeia

Scientific classification
- Kingdom: Animalia
- Phylum: Chordata
- Class: Reptilia
- Order: Squamata
- Suborder: Serpentes
- Family: Colubridae
- Subfamily: Colubrinae
- Genus: Crotaphopeltis; Fitzinger, 1843

= Crotaphopeltis =

Genus of snakes

Crotaphopeltis is a genus of snakes in the family Colubridae. The genus is endemic to Sub-Saharan Africa and includes both forest- and savanna-associated species. All Crotaphopeltis are terrestrial.

== Species ==
The following six species are recognized as being valid.

- Crotaphopeltis barotseensis Broadley, 1968
- Crotaphopeltis braestrupi Rasmussen, 1985
- Crotaphopeltis degeni (Boulenger, 1906)
- Crotaphopeltis hippocrepis (J.T. Reinhardt, 1843)
- Crotaphopeltis hotamboeia (Laurenti, 1768)
- Crotaphopeltis tornieri (F. Werner, 1908)

Nota bene: A binomial authority in parentheses indicates that the species was originally described in a genus other than Crotaphopeltis.
