= Mamre Nature Garden =

Nature reserve in Cape Town, South Africa

- Location within Western Cape
- Location: Western Cape, South Africa
- Nearest city: Mamre
- Coordinates: 33°31′42″S 18°29′17″E
- Area: 254 ha (630 acres)

Mamre Nature Garden is a 254-hectare (630-acre) nature reserve in Cape Town, South Africa, located on the city's northern outskirts. The reserve has a high degree of biodiversity and preserving the endangered Atlantis Sand Fynbos vegetation type and the plants and animals that live in it. In addition, the reserve has an important cultural history.

== Biodiversity ==
The 254 ha (630 acres) area of Mamre Nature Garden protects a rare and valuable piece of the endangered Atlantis Sand Fynbos vegetation type. Among the many plants to be found here are Protea repens, Gladiolus gracilis ("bloupypie"), Salvia lanceolata, Erica decora. A variety of animals can also be found at this reserve.

== Cultural history ==
This area used to be called "Geelvlei" (Yellow vlei) because of the masses of small yellow flowers that covered the area. Much of the wetland area and floral richness is now gone. A settlement was established here in 1701 by the Cape governor, and it was home to a Moravian mission at Louwskloof – now a Provincial Heritage Site. The September Spring Flower Festival used to be held here, due to this spot's impressive annual display of indigenous wildflowers. The festival now takes place nearby at Mamre.

== See also ==
- Biodiversity of Cape Town
- List of nature reserves in Cape Town
