= Strongylopus kilimanjaro =

Conservation status
- Data Deficient (IUCN 3.1)

Scientific classification
- Kingdom: Animalia
- Phylum: Chordata
- Class: Amphibia
- Order: Anura
- Family: Pyxicephalidae
- Genus: Strongylopus
- Species: S. kilimanjaro

Binomial name
- Strongylopus kilimanjaro Clarke and Poynton, 2005

Species of frog

Strongylopus kilimanjaro is a species of frog in the family Pyxicephalidae. It is endemic to Tanzania and only known from a narrow alpine range on the middle slopes of Mount Kilimanjaro, within the East African montane moorlands ecoregion. It is known only from three specimens collected in 1936. The lack of recent records is probably a reflection of very limited survey effort in the area since then.

== Description ==
Three adult males in the type series measure 36 to 39 mm (1.4 to 1.5 in) in snout–vent length. The body is stocky. The snout is short. The tympanum is visible. There is a pronounced, light vertebral band, containing an inner pair of darker, somewhat irregular and discontinuous longitudinal stripes. The border of the light band coincides with discontinuous skin ridges. The rest of the remainder of the dorsum is brown with sparse darker mottling. There is also a dark lateral line, running over the loreal region, continuing as a narrow strip below the eye, expanding behind the eye to cover the tympanic area, and continuing a very irregular dark band on the flanks. The fingers have fringes but no webbing. The toes are extremely elongated, albeit relatively short compared to other Strongylopus. The toes have some basal webbing.

== Habitat and conservation ==
The type series was collected at around 3,230 m (10,600 ft) above sea level. It is presumably associated with cold mountain streams (where it probably breeds) in alpine African moorland. It occurs in well-protected habitat, in the Kilimanjaro National Park. Climate change might be a threat.
