= Strongylopus merumontanus =

Conservation status
- Least Concern (IUCN 3.1)

Scientific classification
- Kingdom: Animalia
- Phylum: Chordata
- Class: Amphibia
- Order: Anura
- Family: Pyxicephalidae
- Genus: Strongylopus
- Species: S. merumontanus

Binomial name
- Strongylopus merumontanus (Lönnberg, 1910)

Synonyms
- Rana merumontana Lönnberg, 1910

Species of frog

Strongylopus merumontanus is a species of frog in the family Pyxicephalidae. It was previously thought to occur only on Mount Meru of Meru District of Arusha Regionn in northern Tanzania, but the species is currently also known from the Eastern Arc Mountains and the highlands of southern Tanzania, Zimbabwe, Malawi, northern Mozambique. The common name Mt. Meru stream frog has been coined for it.

On Mount Meru, it occurs at elevations of 1,000–3,000 m (3,300–9,800 ft) above sea level. It is associated with streams in both upper montane forest and afro-alpine heathland; however, juveniles may venture into the forest, far from streams. It is locally abundant on Mount Meru where its range is protected by the Arusha National Park.
