= Wager's stream frog =

Conservation status
- Least Concern (IUCN 3.1)

Scientific classification
- Kingdom: Animalia
- Phylum: Chordata
- Class: Amphibia
- Order: Anura
- Family: Pyxicephalidae
- Genus: Strongylopus
- Species: S. wageri

Binomial name
- Strongylopus wageri (Wager, 1961)

Species of amphibian

Wager's stream frog (Strongylopus wageri) is a species of frog in the family Pyxicephalidae found in South Africa and possibly Lesotho and Eswatini. Its natural habitats are temperate forest, temperate grassland, and rivers. It is threatened by habitat loss.
