= Crotaphopeltis hippocrepis =

Conservation status
- Least Concern (IUCN 3.1)

Scientific classification
- Kingdom: Animalia
- Phylum: Chordata
- Class: Reptilia
- Order: Squamata
- Suborder: Serpentes
- Family: Colubridae
- Genus: Crotaphopeltis
- Species: C. hippocrepis

Binomial name
- Crotaphopeltis hippocrepis (Reinhardt, 1843)

Species of snake

Crotaphopeltis hippocrepis is a species of snake of the family Colubridae.

== Geographic range ==
The snake is found in Sub-Saharan Africa.
