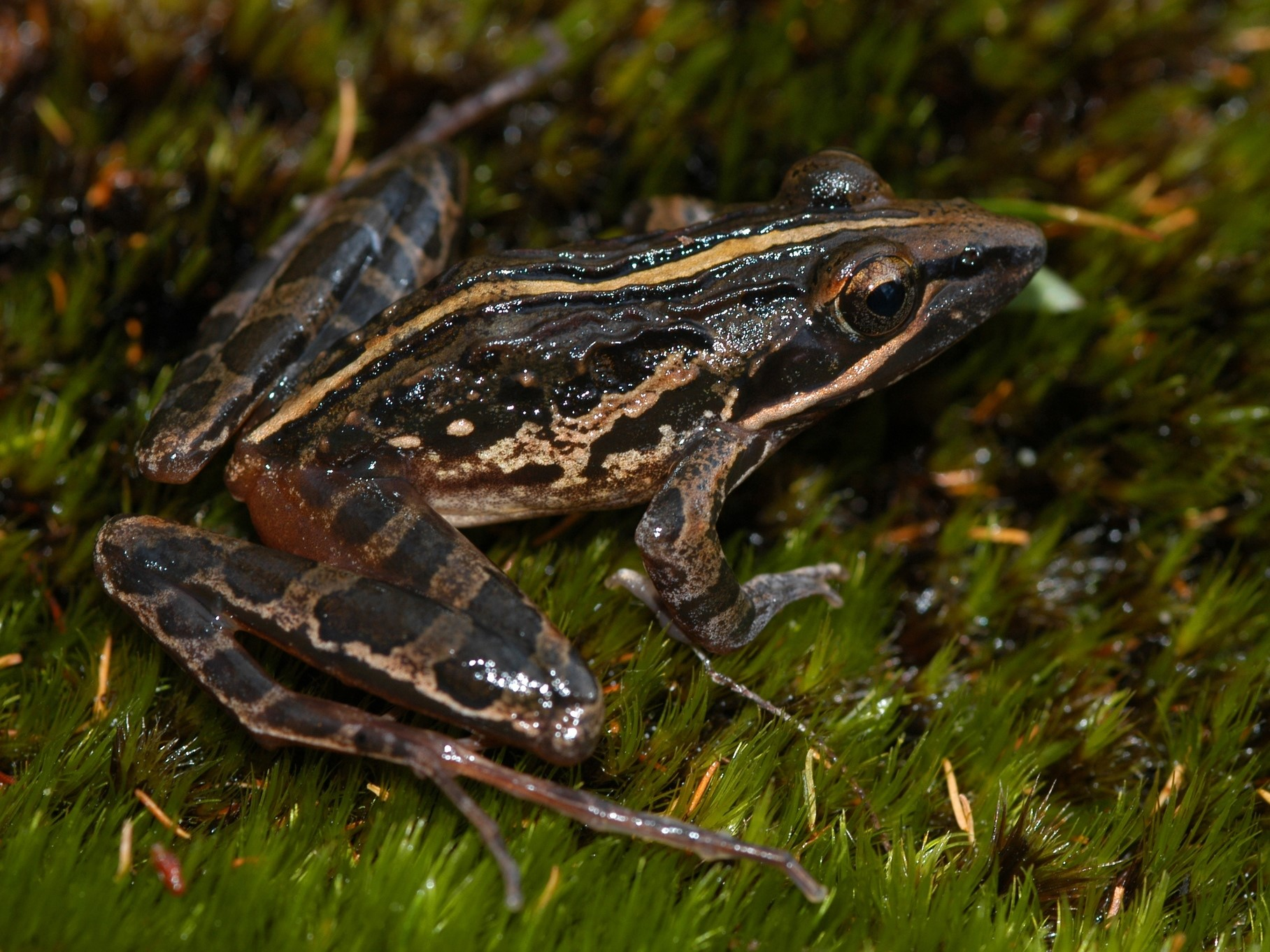

Conservation status
- Least Concern (IUCN 3.1)

Scientific classification
- Kingdom: Animalia
- Phylum: Chordata
- Class: Amphibia
- Order: Anura
- Family: Pyxicephalidae
- Genus: Strongylopus
- Species: S. bonaespei

Binomial name
- Strongylopus bonaespei (Dubois, 1981)

Synonyms
- Rana bonaespei Dubois, 1981; Strongylopus montanus Channing, 1979

= Banded stream frog =

Species of amphibian

The banded stream frog (Strongylopus bonaespei), also known as the banded sand frog, Cape grass frog, Cape stream frog, long-toed frog, mountain frog or Jonkersberg frog, is a species of frogs in the family Pyxicephalidae. It is endemic to South Africa.

== Description ==
The banded stream frog is a slender streamlined frog with a long pointed snout and long hind legs where the distance from the ankle to the knee is greater than half the length of the body. When the frog is sitting the fourth toe on the hind foot extends past the front foot. The dorsal skinis pale but is marked with brown, gold, grey, and sometimes red to orange stripes running along the body while the legs have bands which run across them. The anterior skin is smooth and white.

== Distribution ==
The banded stream frog is endemic to South Africa, and is almost endemic to the Western Cape but its distribution just extends into the western Eastern Cape. It range extends from extending the Cape Peninsula north into the Cederberg Mountains, and east as far as Witelsbos Forest Reserve in the Tsitsikamma Mountains.

== Habitat ==
The banded stream frog typically inhabits montane fynbos but it occasionally occurs on the margins of exotic pine forest where this has been planted over fynbos. It prefers flat, open situations near streams and tends to avoid steep slopes and deep valleys. It is found in regions where the annual rainfall exceeds 500mm. For breeding it uses well vegetated shallow seasonal marshy areas and seepages, with long grass, restios, or infrequently, ferns.

== Habits ==
The banded stream is mainly a winter breeder, .i.e. May to August, but if it is wet enough the males also call in spring or late summer. The normal calling position is a crouched position on the ground near water below marginal overhanging vegetation, and also from 10 to 20 cm above the ground, gripping grass stems and in a spread eagle posture. The banded stream frog may occasionally form dense breeding choruses early in the breeding season when there are ideal conditions, however, the advertisement calls are usually individual as the calling males are scattered and situated apart from one each other. The males may call at any time during the day or night, but mostly around sunset. The banded stream frog lays its eggs out of the water on waterlogged soil or in moss at the base of tussocks of vegetation, the eggs are laid within about 5–20 cm of temporary pools or shallow streams of water emanating from seepages. The clutch size varies from 34 to 104 eggs and they are laid singly but the females may scatter them or she may group them in clusters, or deposit them in rows of up to six or seven. The tadpoles that develop from the eggs are benthic and they complete their metamorphosis in water.

== Conservation ==
Although the banded stream frog is listed as least concern it is threatened by habitat loss caused by invasive alien vegetation, forestry, wildflower farming, artificial drainage, fires and development. Much of the banded stream frog's habitat is in protected areas.

== Etymology ==
The binomial name refers to the Cape of Good Hope, meaning "bonaespei" being Latin for "good hope".
