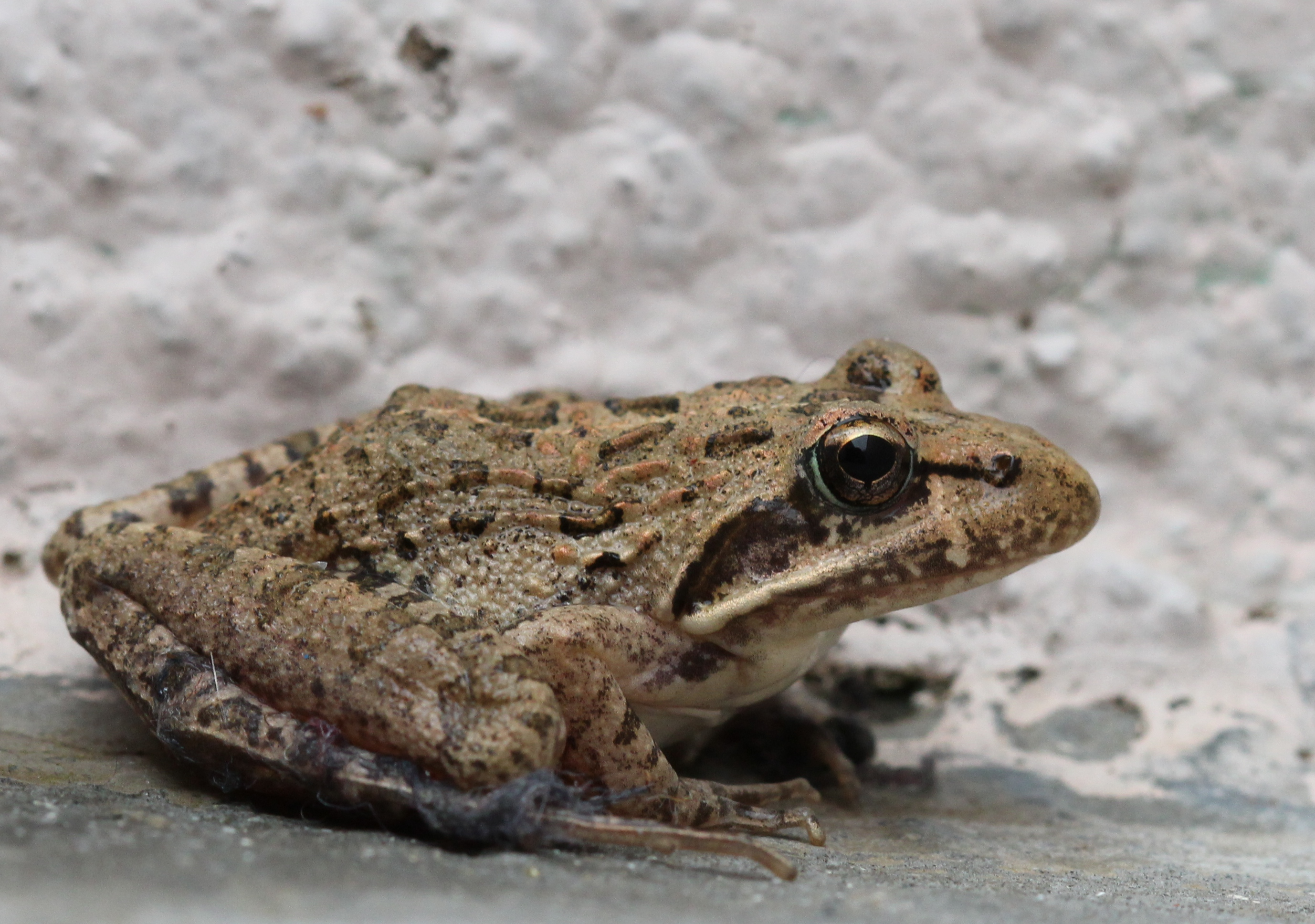
- Gray's stream frog (Strongylopus grayii)

Scientific classification
- Domain: Eukaryota
- Kingdom: Animalia
- Phylum: Chordata
- Class: Amphibia
- Order: Anura
- Family: Pyxicephalidae
- Subfamily: Cacosterninae
- Genus: Strongylopus; Tschudi, 1838

Type species
- Rana fasciata Smith, 1849

= Strongylopus =

Genus of amphibians

Strongylopus ('strongylos'=round, 'pus'=foot) is a genus of pyxicephalid frogs native to Africa. They are found in the area from southwestern South Africa and Namibia to northern Tanzania. Their common name is stream frogs.

== Description ==
Strongylopus are small to medium-sized frogs: adult snout–vent lengths are typically in the range of 25–53 millimetres (0.98–2.09 in). Species within this genus may be found at altitudes from sea level up to 3250 m in elevation. They generally occur in riparian habitats, including fynbos heath, grassland, montane flooded grassland, savanna and forest edge. Some species occur in more specific habitats, such as Strongylopus kilimanjaro in alpine moorland near cold water streams.

== Species ==
These species belong to this genus:

- Strongylopus bonaespei (Dubois, 1981) – Banded stream frog
- Strongylopus fasciatus (Smith, 1849) – Striped stream frog
- Strongylopus fuelleborni (Nieden, 1911) – Fuelleborn's stream frog
- Strongylopus grayii (Smith, 1849) – Gray's stream frog
- Strongylopus kilimanjaro (Clarke and Poynton, 2005)
- Strongylopus kitumbeine (Channing and Davenport, 2002)
- Strongylopus merumontanus (Lönnberg, 1910)
- Strongylopus rhodesianus (Hewitt, 1933) – Chimanimani stream frog
- Strongylopus springbokensis (Channing, 1986) – Namaqua stream frog
- Strongylopus wageri (Wager, 1961) – Wager's stream frog
