= Atlantis Sand Fynbos =

Vegetation type from north of Cape Town, in the Western Cape, South Africa

Atlantis Sand Fynbos is a critically endangered fynbos vegetation type that occurs to the north of Cape Town, in the Western Cape, South Africa.

It is listed as critically endangered as it is home to a great many threatened Red List species.

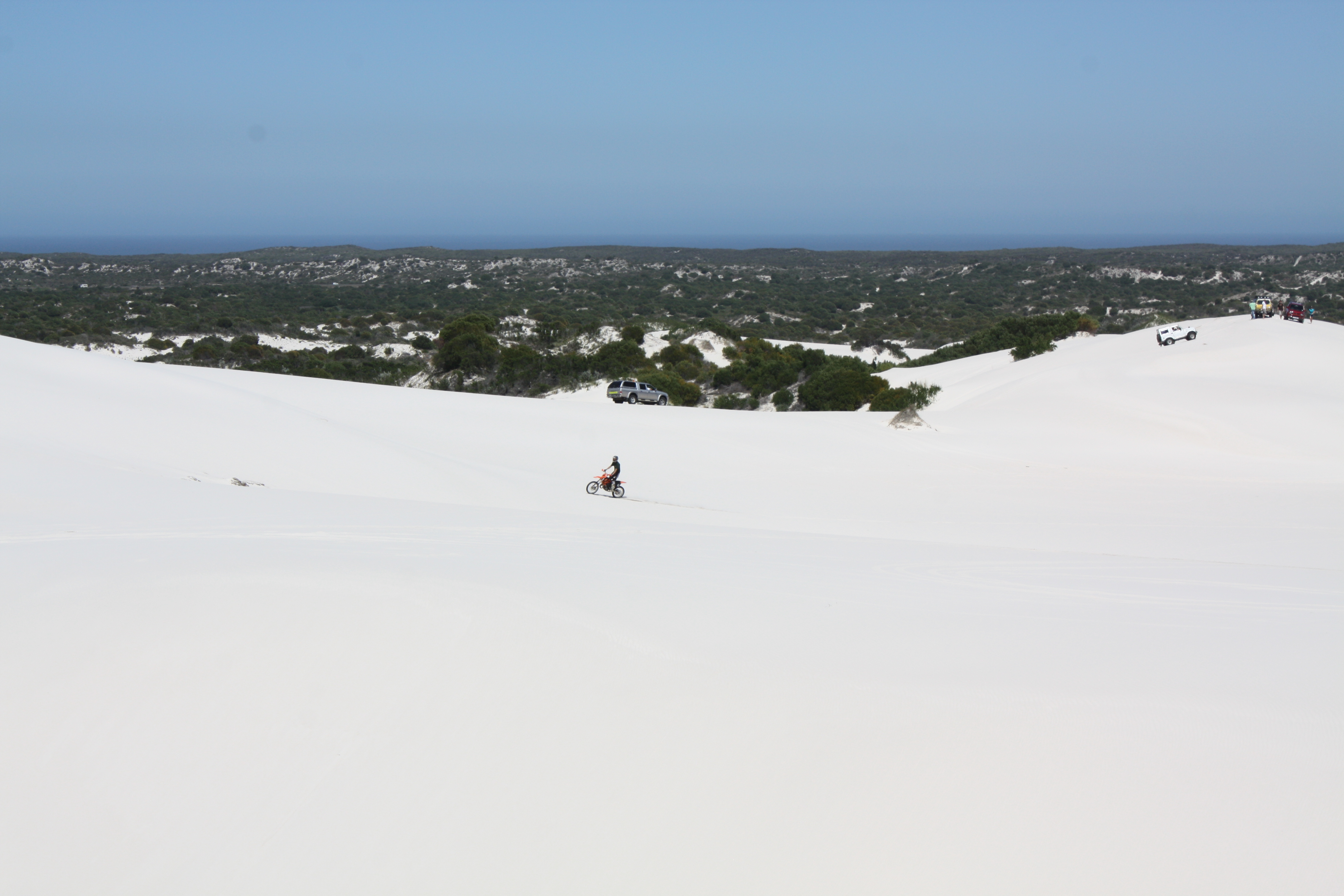

== See also ==
- Biodiversity of Cape Town
- Cape Flats Sand Fynbos
- Hangklip Sand Fynbos
- Category:Fynbos
