= Chimanimani stream frog =

Conservation status
- Vulnerable (IUCN 3.1)

Scientific classification
- Kingdom: Animalia
- Phylum: Chordata
- Class: Amphibia
- Order: Anura
- Family: Pyxicephalidae
- Genus: Strongylopus
- Species: S. rhodesianus

Binomial name
- Strongylopus rhodesianus (Hewitt, 1933)

Species of amphibian

The Chimanimani stream frog (Strongylopus rhodesianus) is a species of frog in the family Pyxicephalidae found in Zimbabwe and Mozambique. Its natural habitats are subtropical or tropical moist montane forest, subtropical or tropical high-altitude shrubland, subtropical or tropical high-altitude grassland, and rivers. It is threatened by habitat loss.

The type was obtained from Chirinda Forest. It is native to the Eastern Highlands and Mount Gorongosa, Mozambique.
