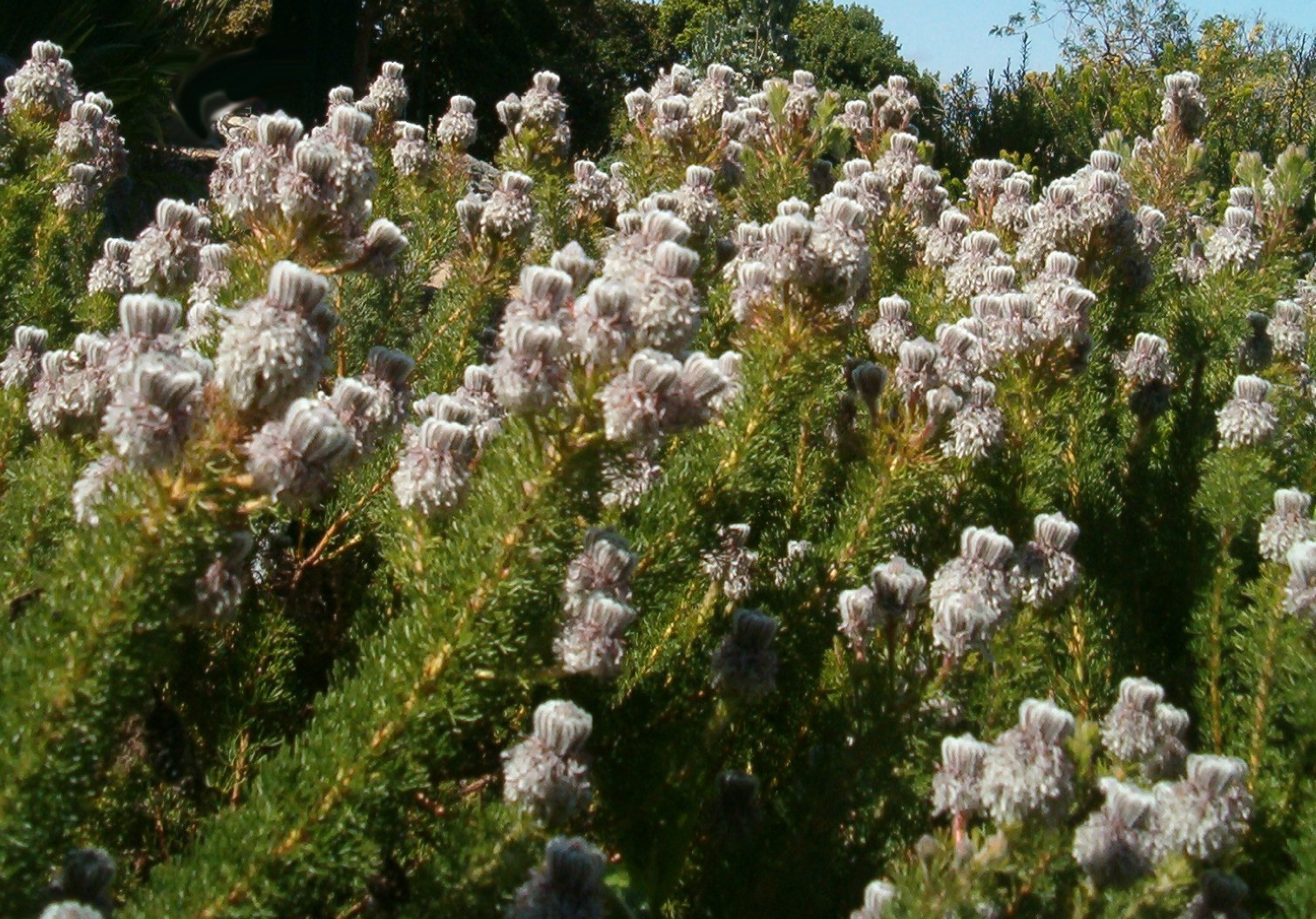

Conservation status
- Endangered (IUCN 3.1)

Scientific classification
- Kingdom: Plantae
- Clade: Tracheophytes
- Clade: Angiosperms
- Clade: Eudicots
- Order: Proteales
- Family: Proteaceae
- Genus: Serruria
- Species: S. brownii

Binomial name
- Serruria brownii Meisn.

= Serruria brownii =

Species of flowering plant

Serruria brownii, the bottlebrush spiderhead, is a flower-bearing shrub that belongs to the family Proteaceae and forms part of the fynbos. The plant is native to the Western Cape, South Africa.

== Description ==
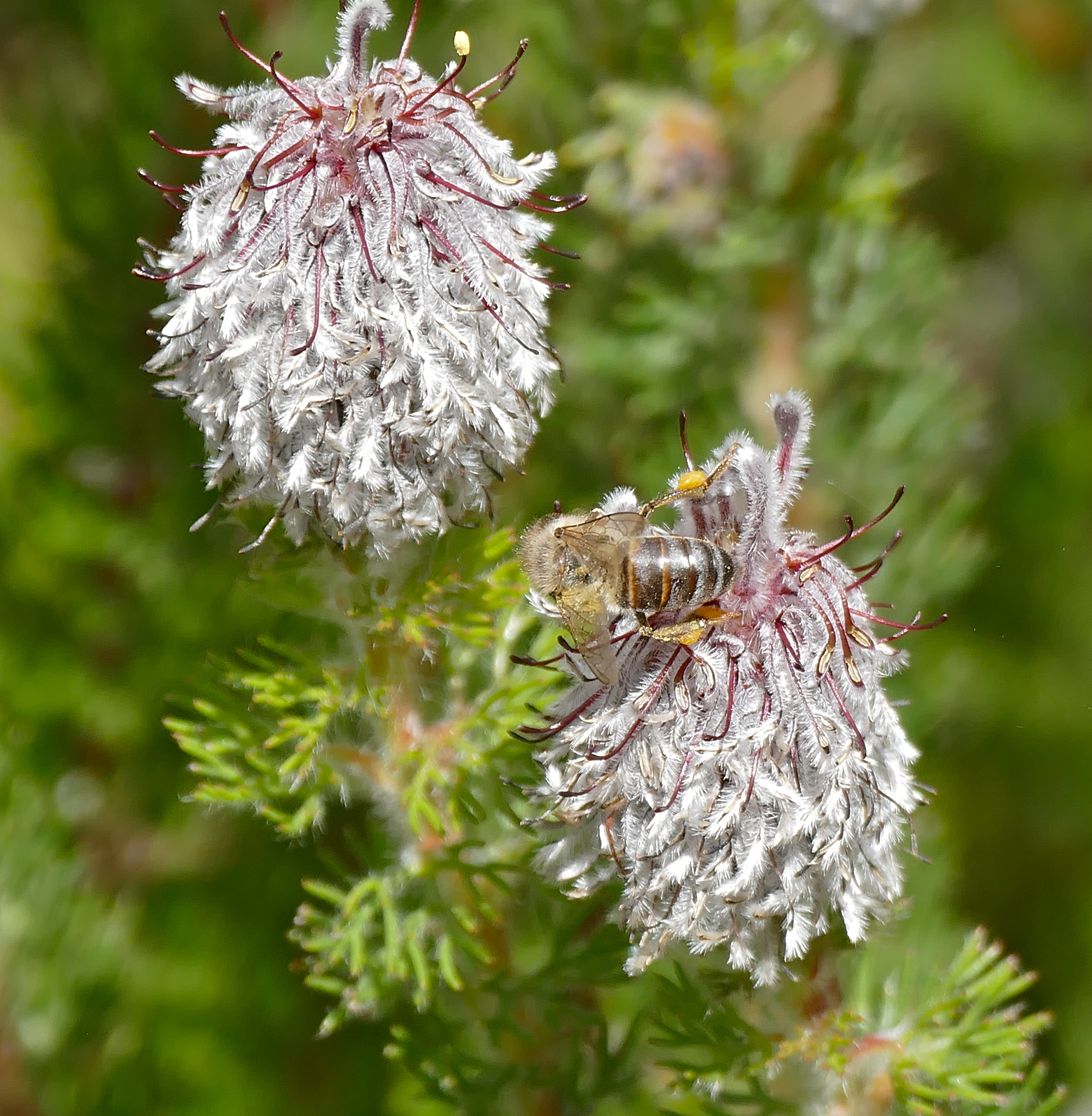

The shrub is erect and grows only 50 cm (20 in) tall and bears flowers from June to October. Fire destroys the plant but the seeds survive. Two months after flowering, the fruit falls off and ants disperse the seeds. They store the seeds in their nests. The plant is bisexual. Pollination takes place through the action of insects.

In Afrikaans, it is known as fleskwasbos.

== Distribution and habitat ==
The plant occurs on the plains from Hopefield to Tygerberg. It grows mainly in granite soil, shale and thick sand at altitudes of 50–250 m (160–820 ft).

== Gallery ==
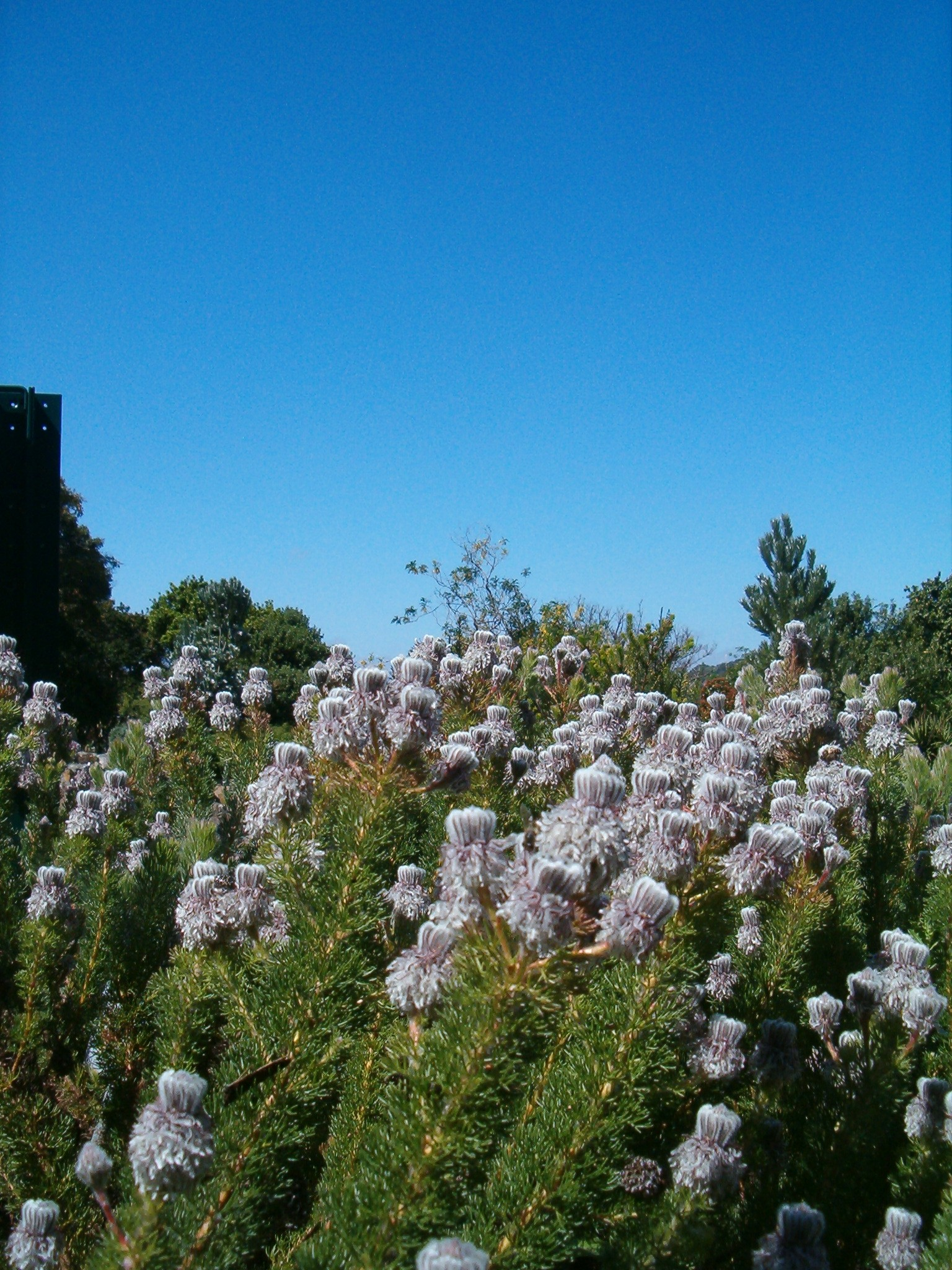

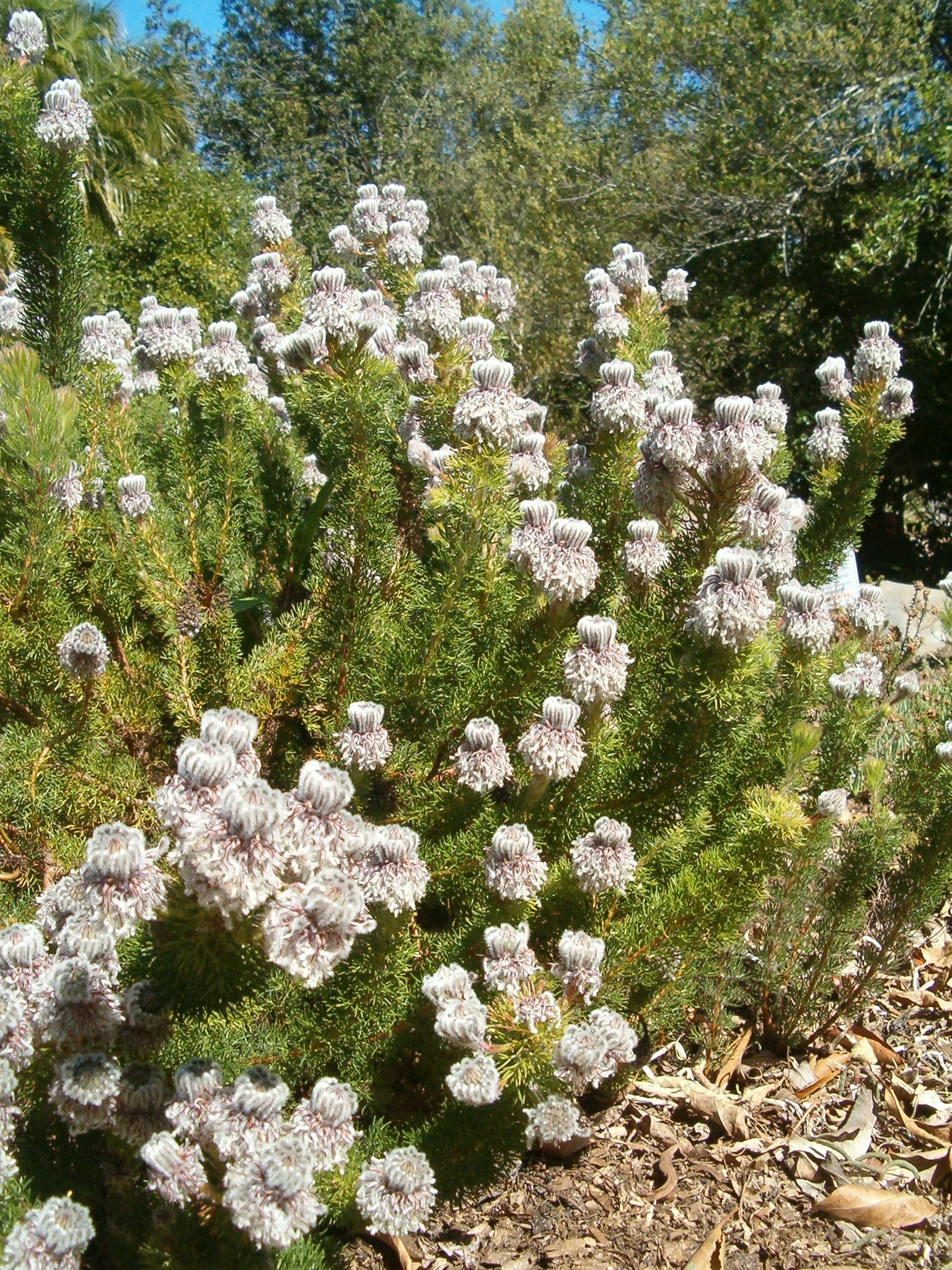

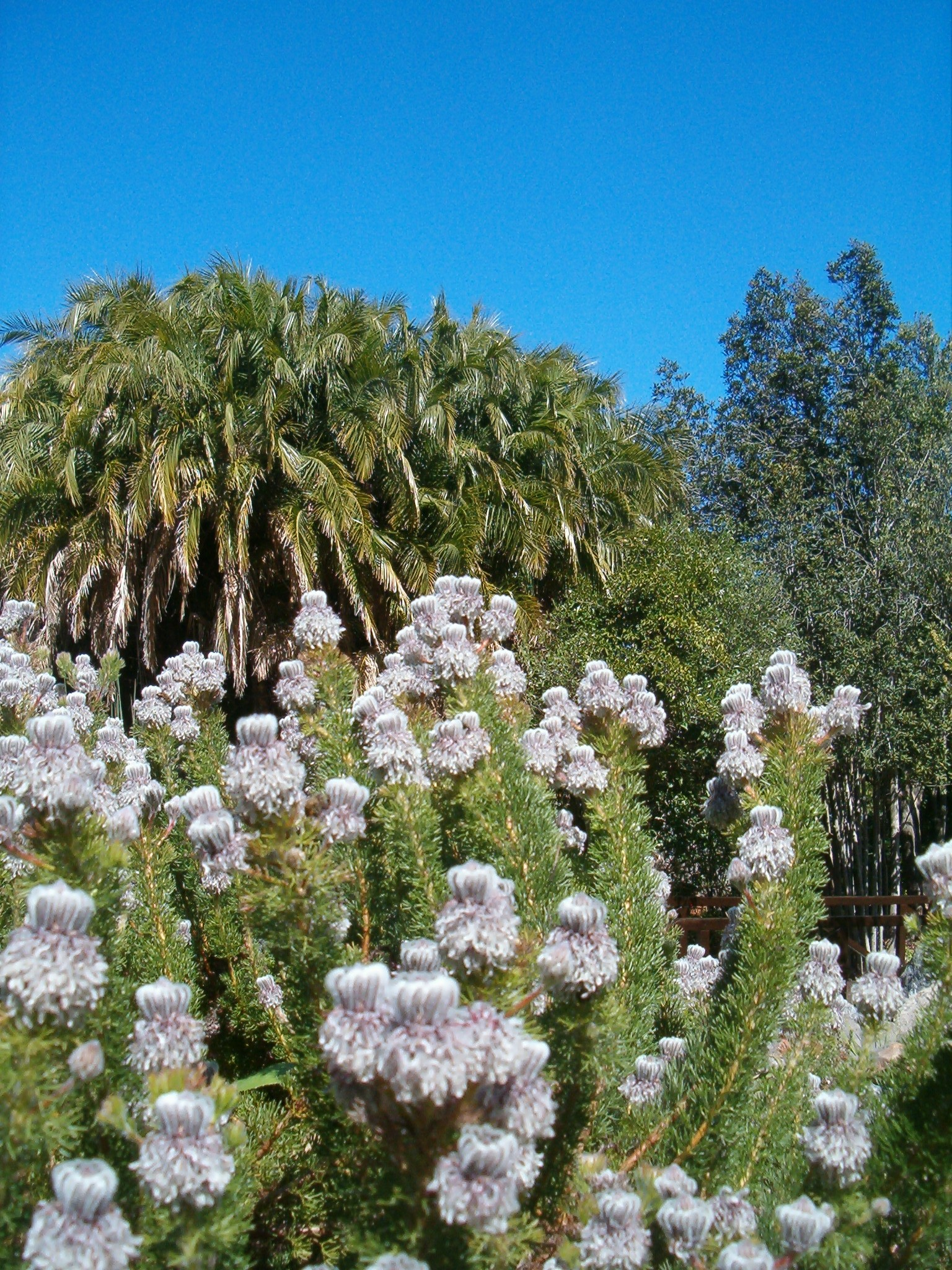
