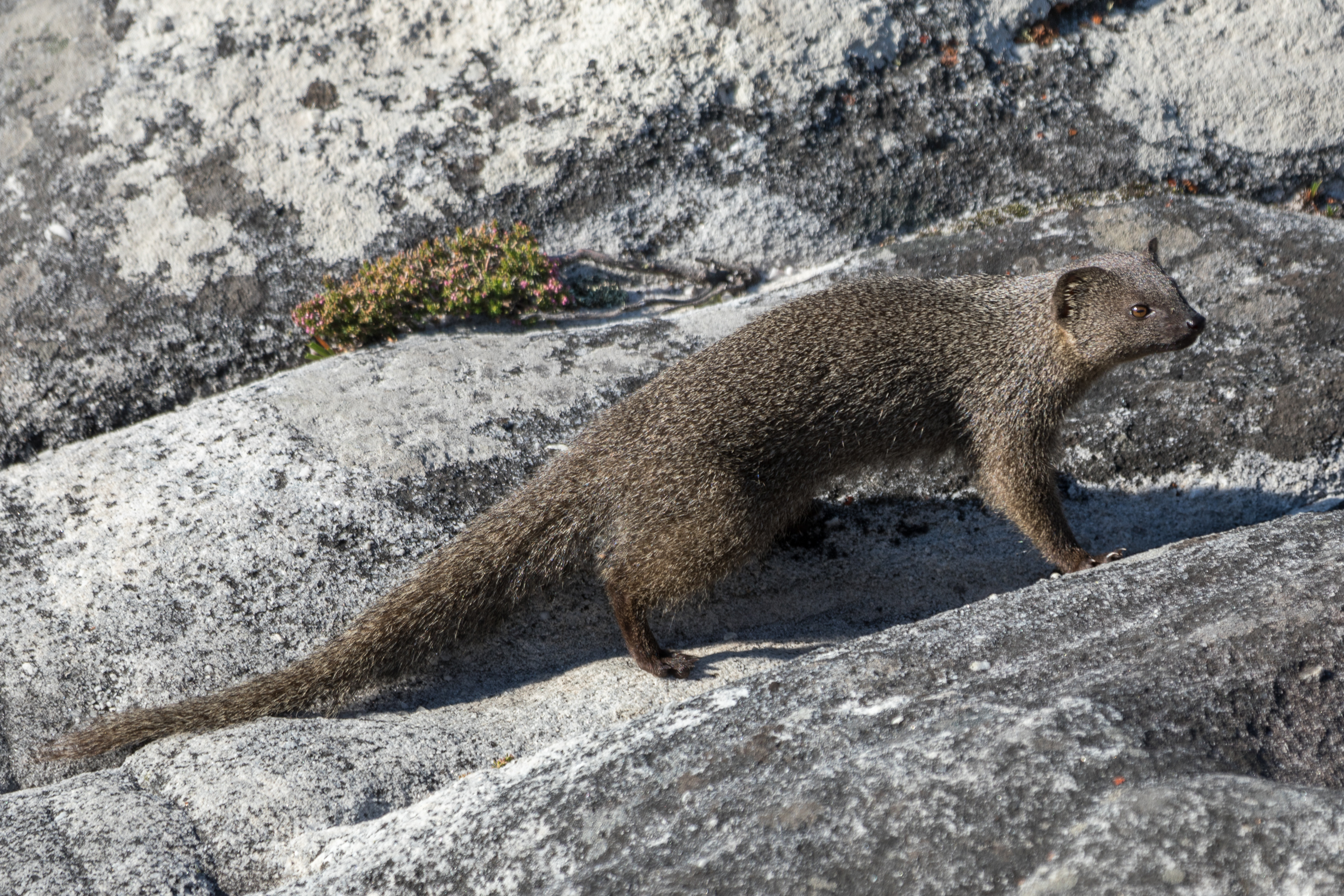
- On the plateau of Table Mountain

Conservation status
- Least Concern (IUCN 3.1)

Scientific classification
- Kingdom: Animalia
- Phylum: Chordata
- Class: Mammalia
- Order: Carnivora
- Family: Herpestidae
- Genus: Herpestes
- Species: H. pulverulentus

Binomial name
- Herpestes pulverulentus (Wagner, 1839)
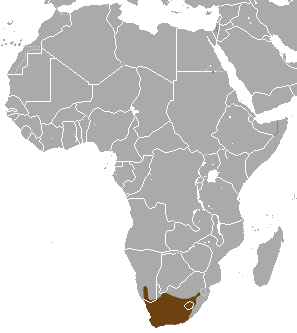
- Cape grey mongoose range

Synonyms
- Galerella pulverulenta

= Cape grey mongoose =

Species of mongoose from southern Africa

The Cape grey mongoose (Herpestes pulverulentus), also called the small grey mongoose, is a small mammal native to South Africa, Lesotho and southern Namibia.

== Appearance ==
It is a small species (5–69 centimetres (2.0–27.2 in) long, weight range 0.5–1.0 kilogram (1.1–2.2 lb)). It is a dark grey colour with a darker tip of the tail. The legs are a darker grey than the rest of the body. It has a typical elongated mongoose body-shape. The ears are small and rounded and are situated on the sides of the head. The tail is long and bushy. The teeth show adaptations for both cutting and crushing.

== Diet and behaviour ==
The Cape grey mongoose feeds mostly on insects and small rodents, but will also eat birds, small reptiles, amphibians, other invertebrates, and fruit. They have been known to eat carrion and garbage as well.

It is predominantly insectivorous but also carnivorous. Insects and other arthropods such as spiders are caught on the ground and then held down with the forefeet and eaten. Larger prey such as rodents are stalked and killed with a bite to the head. Large prey items are held down with the forefeet and then torn into bite size pieces with the teeth.

Small rodents, in particular Otomys and Rhabdomys, are their most important dietary component. On occasion, immature hares or the young of small antelopes such as Cape grysbok may be attacked.

== Distribution ==
Until a few decades ago, the species was thought to be endemic to the Cape Province, but it is now known to occur in much of the rest of South Africa and in the west, northwards to southern Angola. It is not yet clear how continuous the range is, nor how much of this wider presence is due to extension of its range. Its density in areas where the species is established, ranges from one mongoose per 60 hectares to one per two hectares.

== Habitat ==
It inhabits macchia-type vegetation (fynbos), semi-desert scrub (Karoo), thicket and forest. However, it is not found in the grassland biome. Often they live in close association with man, often under the floors of outbuildings, and even live successfully on the fringe of suburbia. When habituated to human presence, they may tolerate close approach.

== Behaviour ==
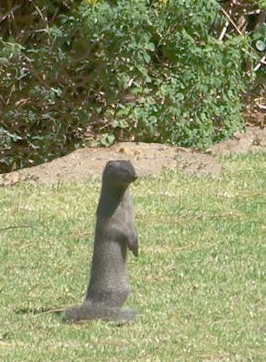
Cape grey mongoose, late adolescent, member of a family party, inspecting surroundings

The Cape grey mongoose is diurnal. When not breeding, it is solitary, but litter remains together in a family party at least until late adolescence. They live in overlapping home ranges of 5–68 hectares (12–168 acres), with the males having larger ranges than the females. However, it is not entirely clear whether this species is territorial or not, or whether it might be more social than generally believed. They are poor diggers so they utilize piles of rocks, crevices, deserted burrows and hollows in tree trunks for shelter when there is not sufficient bush cover. They are often spotted by humans when they cross roads.

== Reproduction ==
Litters of 1–3 young are born from August to December and are hidden in burrows, rock crevices or tree hollows. At birth, the pups are fully furred but their eyes and ears are closed, only opening after about a fortnight. The young remain in the breeding burrow until they are fully weaned, and leave when they are capable of independence.
