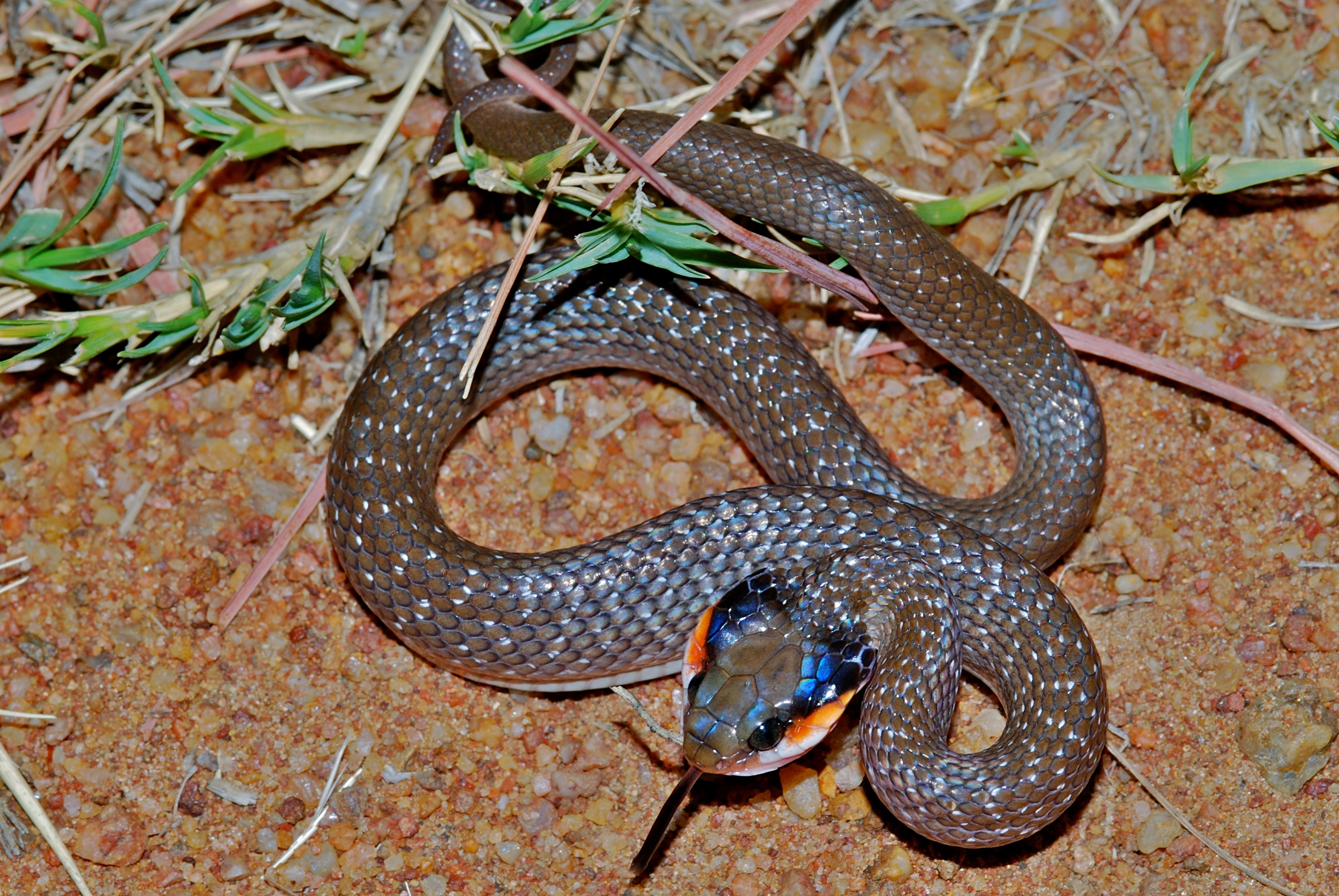

Conservation status
- Least Concern (IUCN 3.1)

Scientific classification
- Kingdom: Animalia
- Phylum: Chordata
- Class: Reptilia
- Order: Squamata
- Suborder: Serpentes
- Family: Colubridae
- Genus: Crotaphopeltis
- Species: C. hotamboeia

Binomial name
- Crotaphopeltis hotamboeia (Laurenti, 1768)

Synonyms
- Coronella hotamboeia Laurenti, 1768; Leptodira [sic] hotamboeia — Peracca, 1897; Leptodeira [sic] hotamboeia — Schmidt, 1923; Crotaphopeltis hotamboeia — Loveridge, 1937

= Crotaphopeltis hotamboeia =

Species of snake

Crotaphopeltis hotamboeia, commonly known as the herald snake or the red-lipped snake, is a species of snake in the family Colubridae. The species is endemic to Sub-Saharan Africa.

== Description ==
Crotaphopeltis hotamboeia can be identified by its olive green or grey body, multiple white speckles, distinctive black head, and red, yellow, white, or black upper lip. It can grow to an average total length (including tail) of 70 cm (28 in), but may reach up to 1 metre (39 inches) in total length.

It is mildly venomous and poses no threat to humans or domestic animals, according to the African Snakebite Institute.

== Diet ==
C. hotamboeia feeds on amphibians (including rain frogs), lizards, and other snakes (only in captivity).

== Longevity ==
The red-lipped snake has been known to live for between 10 and 15 years.

== Reproduction ==
Adult females of C. hotamboeia lay between 6 and 19 eggs in early summer.

== Geographic range ==
Endemic to Sub-Saharan Africa, the herald snake is present in Zambia, throughout South Africa (except for the Karoo and Northern Cape) as well as Lesotho, Eswatini, Zimbabwe, Nigeria, southern and central Mozambique, and northern Botswana.

== Habitat ==
The herald snake favors marshy areas in lowland forest, moist savanna, grasslands, and fynbos.
