= Cape Lowland Freshwater Wetland =

Vegetation type endemic to the Western Cape, South Africa

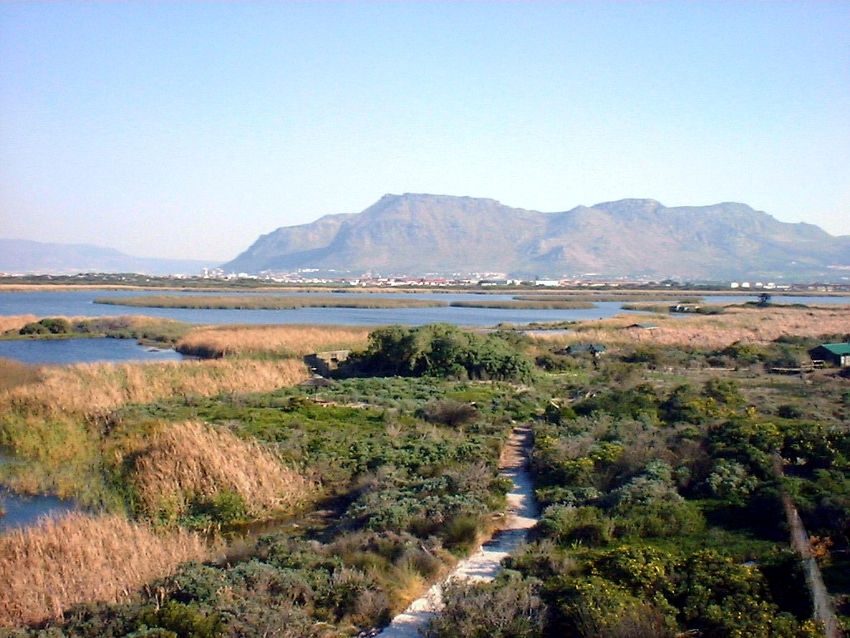
Cape Lowland Freshwater Wetland at Rondevlei, Cape Town

Cape Lowland Freshwater Wetland is a critically endangered vegetation type of the Western Cape, South Africa.

== Environment ==
This type of riparian vegetation and its accompanying ecosystem is found in the Western Cape, South Africa, on freshwater floodplains, along the lower stretches of rivers and around seasonal vleis and estuaries. The terrain is typically flat and the soil is rich and silty. It is restricted to a winter rainfall area.

This used to be one of the major ecosystems on the Cape Flats of Cape Town. The Cape Flats used to have a great many wetlands, rivers and seasonal vleis, but these have largely been drained and built over for housing. A few remain at places such as Rondevlei.

== Ecology ==
The flora consists of a range of species of tall reed (e.g. Phragmites australis, Typha capensis), Restios, sedges, grasses, floating aquatics and a great many species of shrub. Plant cover is very high. Sedgelands predominate on the floodplains, floating aquatics grow in the open pools, taller shrubs and small trees grow in drier soils (e.g. Erica and Restio sp.) and the taller, bigger reed-beds dominate on the fringes of permanent water. Some of the most noticeable and dominant species are Senecio halimnifolius, Paspalum vaginatum, Pennisetum macrourum, Triglochin bulbosa, Bolboschoenus maritimus and Juncus krausii.

Plant species which are endemic to this vegetation type include: Passerina paludosa, Aponogeton angustifolius, Aponogeton distachyos, and Cotula myriophylloides. This ecosystem is not particularly rich in endemics (by Cape Floristic Region standards) but is an exceptionally rich and important habitat for the Waterbirds and Frogs of the Cape. It is also the breeding ground of the endangered Western Leopard Toad.

== Threats and Conservation ==
These ecosystems are threatened by invasive alien plants such as Kikuyu grass, Water Hyacinth (Eichornia crassipes), Red River Gum (Eucalyptus cladocalyx) and Port Jackson (Acacia saligna), as well as the draining and diversion of water for agricultural reasons and development. A significant proportion of these wetlands have now been transformed and lost and the ecosystem as a whole is now classed as endangered. All remaining wetlands are protected by national legislation.

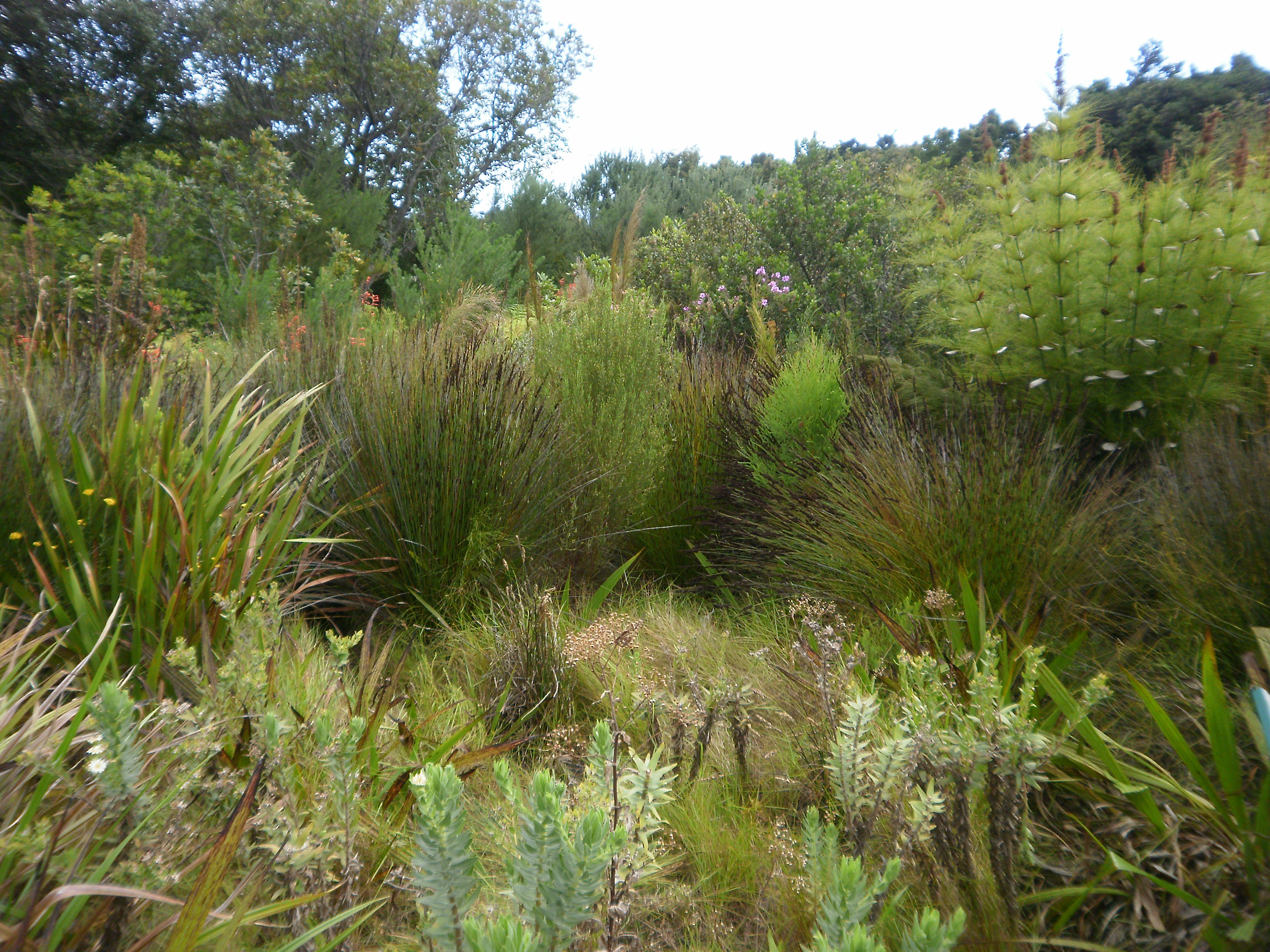

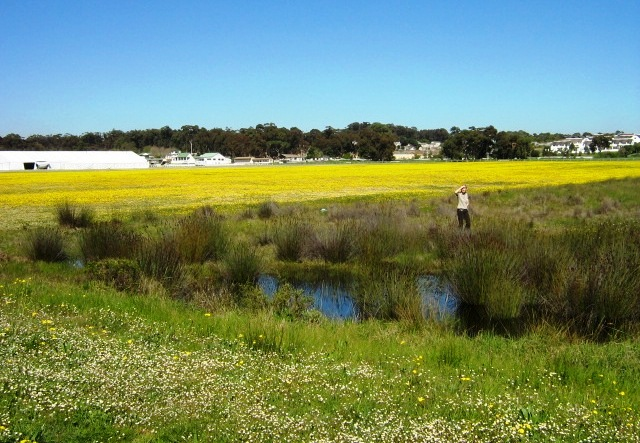
A surviving patch of Cape Freshwater Wetlands in the city of Cape Town.

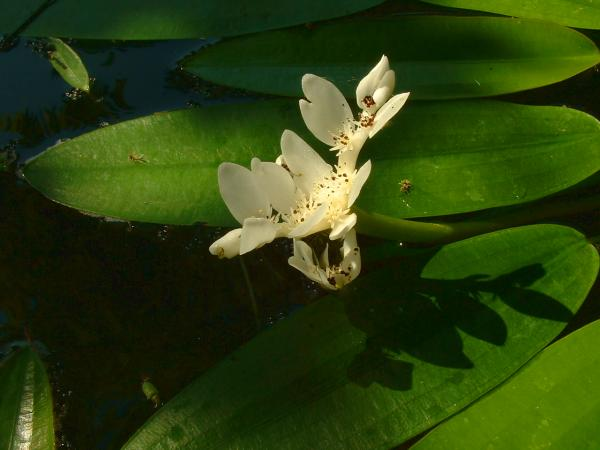
The "Waterblommetjie"(Aponogeton distachyos), a plant endemic to Cape Lowland Freshwater Wetland.

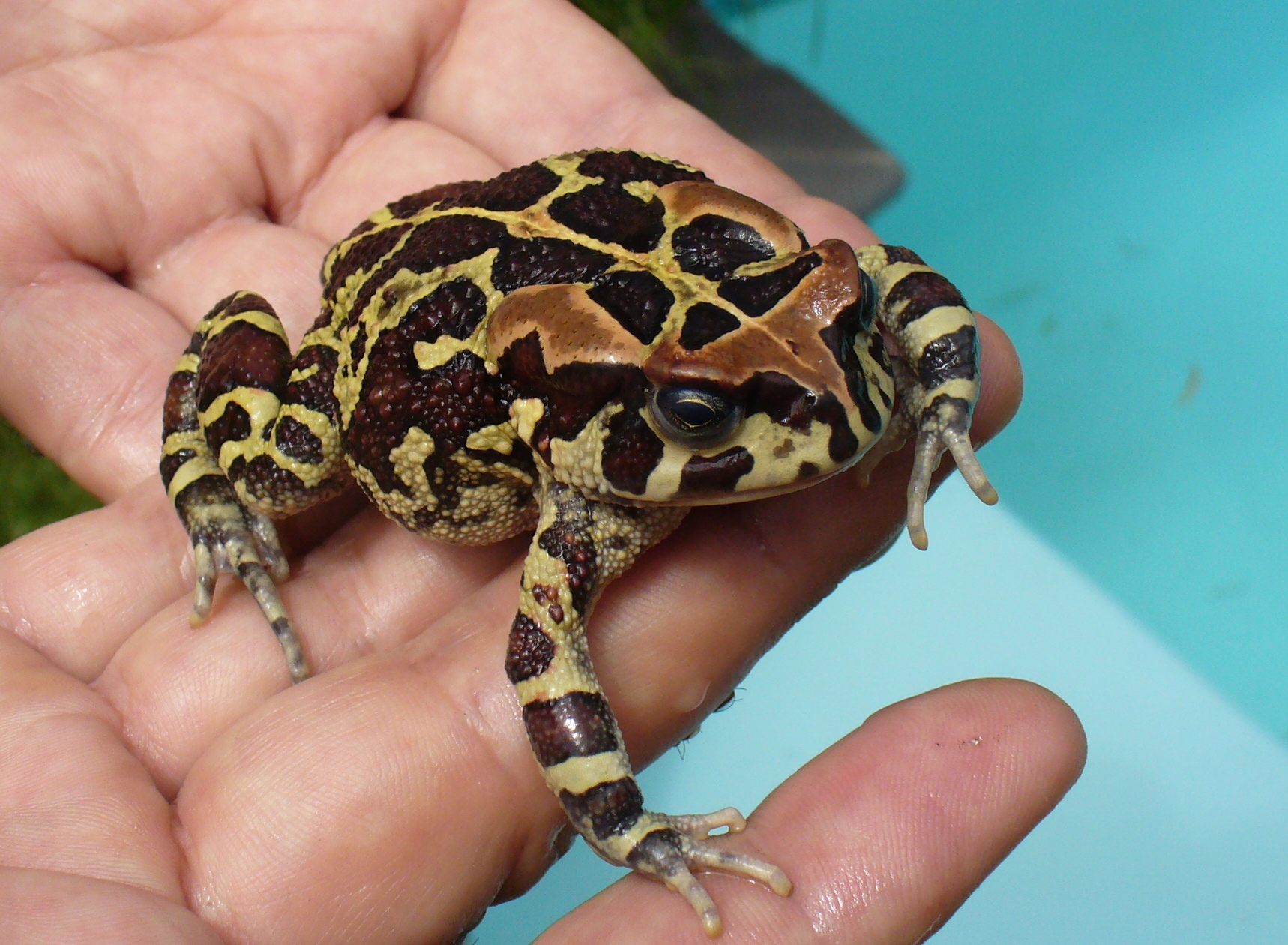
The critically endangered Western Leopard Toad breeds in Cape Lowland Freshwater Wetland.

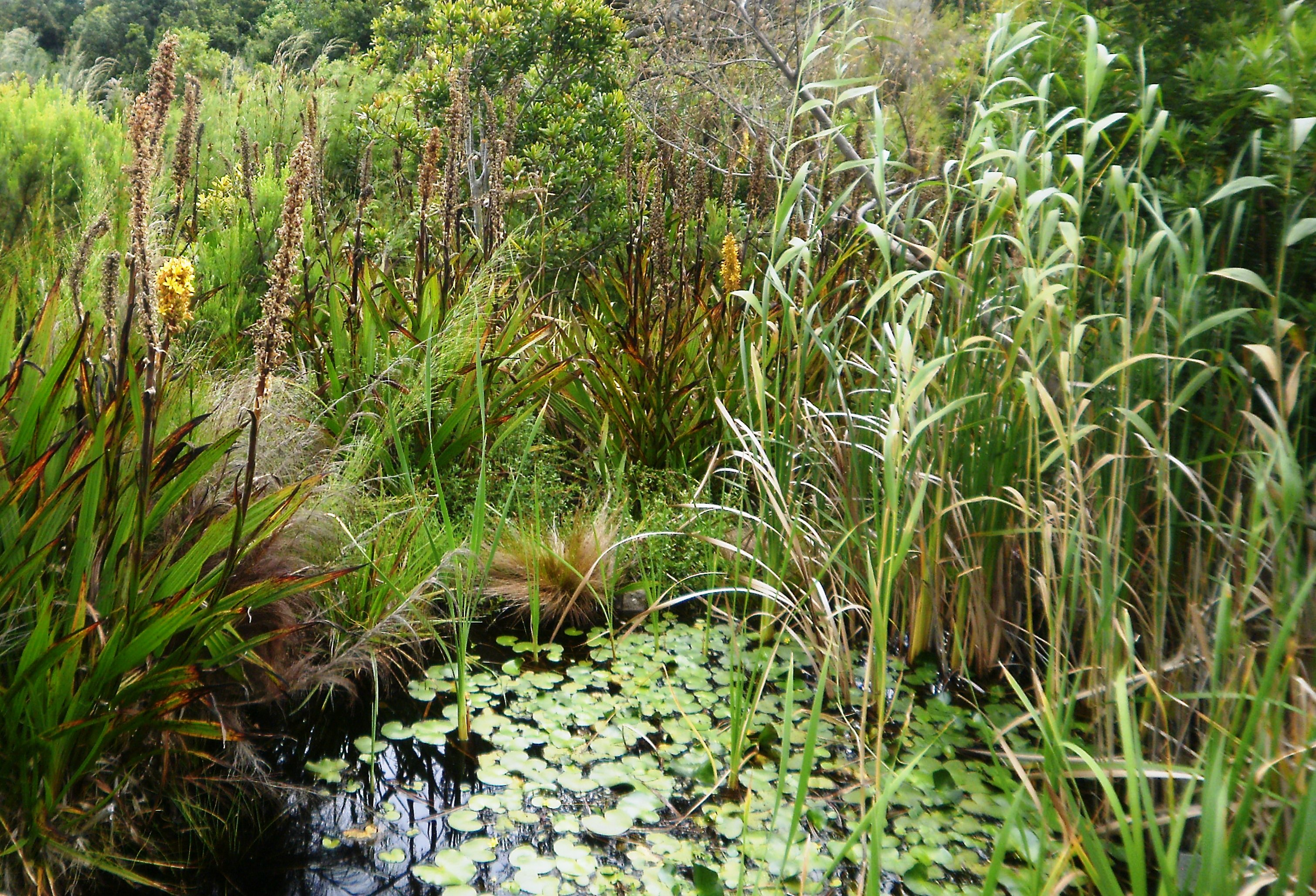

== See also ==
- Biodiversity of Cape Town
- Cape Flats Sand Fynbos
- Cape Floristic Region
- Fynbos
