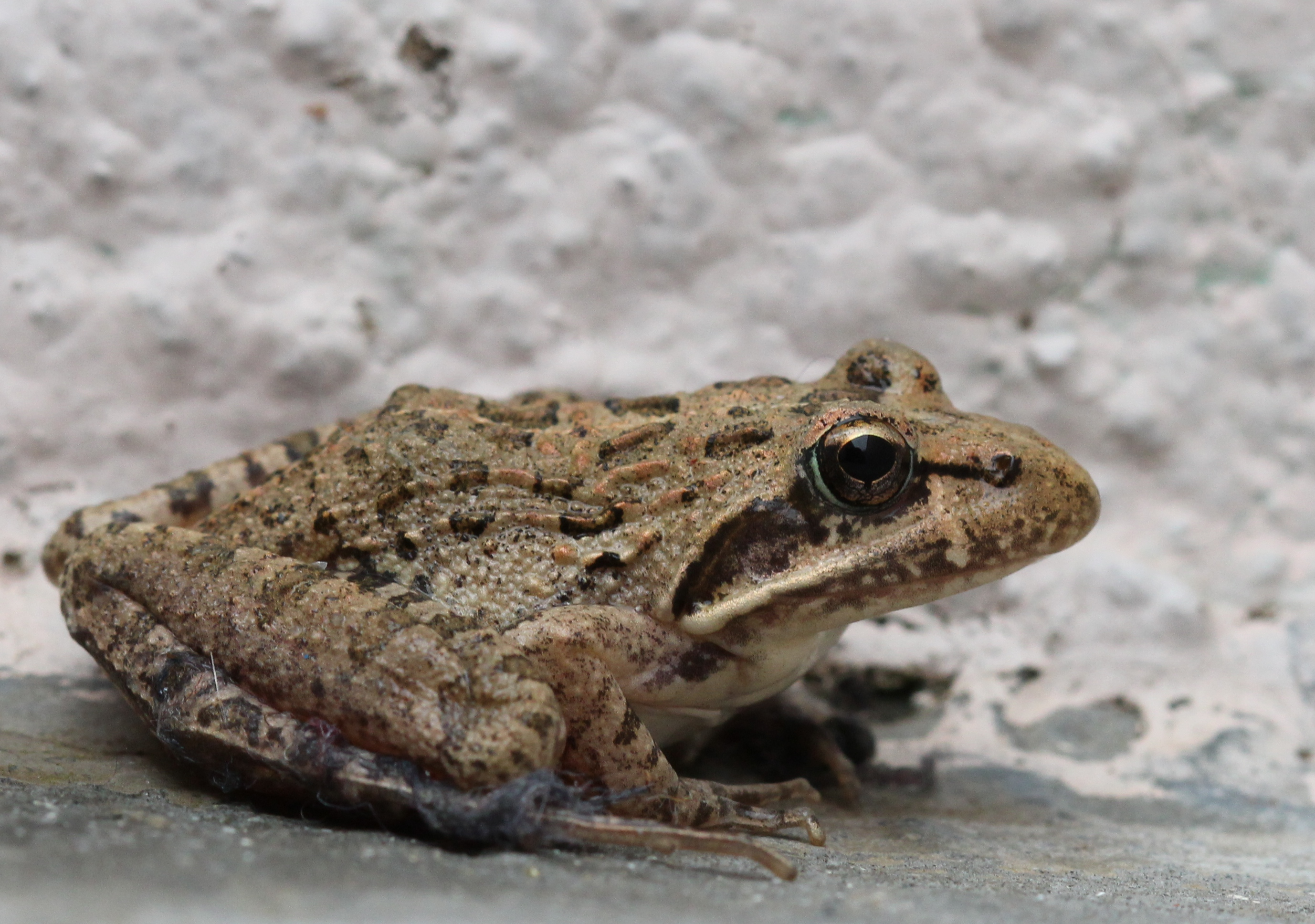

Conservation status
- Least Concern (IUCN 3.1)

Scientific classification
- Kingdom: Animalia
- Phylum: Chordata
- Class: Amphibia
- Order: Anura
- Family: Pyxicephalidae
- Genus: Strongylopus
- Species: S. grayii

Binomial name
- Strongylopus grayii (Smith, 1849)
- Extant (resident) Not pictured is Saint Helena, where it has been introduced and is a resident.

= Gray's stream frog =

Species of amphibian

Gray's stream frog (Strongylopus grayii) is a fairly small species of frog in the family Pyxicephalidae. It is a ground dweller, living mainly in vegetation such as sedges, generally brown, slenderly built and agile, with long, practically unwebbed toes.

== Description ==
Strongylopus grayii is a fairly small species (snout-to-vent length of breeding specimens about 25 to 50 mm). The snout is not as pointed as most of the genus, the snout profile being rather reminiscent of the Cape river frog. The ventral skin is smooth, pale to white, the dorsal skin colour is variable, generally shades of brown with darker blotches. Similar blotches form bars across the upper surfaces of the thighs. Often it has a vertebral line in a lightly contrasting colour, pale to reddish. Some colour variants have a broad russet band down the back. The dorsal skin is textured with scattered small, raised ridges, largely longitudinal. The tympanum is smaller in diameter than the eye, but more than half the diameter. Though clearly visible, it is inconspicuous, being situated in a dark facial band of pigment behind the eye. The facial band extends more or less from the nostril, across the lower part of the eye, rearward over the tympanum, to the base of the fore leg. From below the eye, a pale line runs below the facial band to the shoulder. Above the band a light line runs from the snout, across the eye, above the pupil, rearward to the shoulder. Sexual dimorphism is slight, with the male having golden coloration on the lower jaw.

The toes are well developed and unwebbed, or nearly so, on all four feet. The front toes are slim and roughly as long as the fore legs are thick. The rear toes are long, with the longest (fourth) toe extending forward roughly as far as the front toes when the frog is squatting.

== Range and habitat ==
The species occurs in Lesotho, South Africa, Eswatini, and possibly Botswana and parts of Namibia. It has an introduced population on the remote Atlantic island of Saint Helena. It is a common species.

Gray's stream frog occurs in a wide range of habitats, being only absent from arid areas: it is found in forests, fynbos heathland, thickets, savanna and grassland, as well as modified habitats. Breeding takes place in almost any shallow vegetated body of water.

== Habits ==
Gray's stream frog is locally common where conditions are favourable, such as among grassy or scrubby vegetation around streams and dams, or where there is seasonal water such as roadside ponds or vleis. In the breeding season, its voice is an inoffensive musical click, rather like a drop of water falling into a pond, but when a large chorus is active, such as in sedge around a dam, the effect is like a loud, continuous rattle. Though the males mainly sing in chorus at night, they may call at any time of the day from concealment, particularly in cloudy weather. Like most frogs, the species breeds in standing water and the adults take to the water if alarmed. They can swim rapidly and with agility, but if they are unable to leave the water, they die within a few hours. Rather than simple drowning, the cause of death seems be absorption of too much water through the skin.
