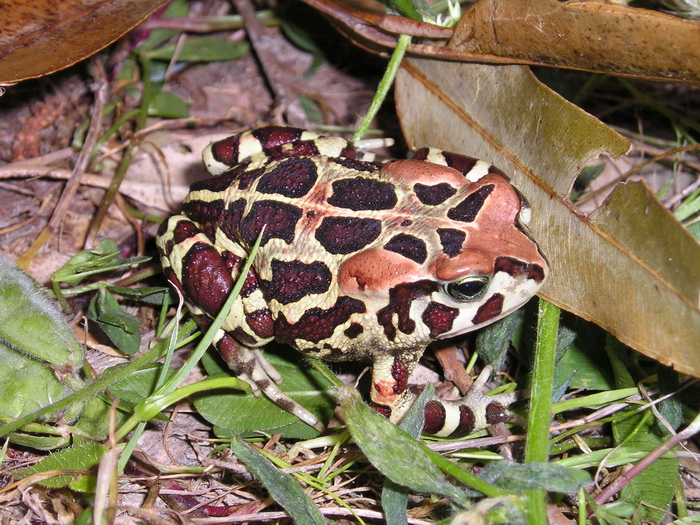

Conservation status
- Endangered (IUCN 3.1)

Scientific classification
- Kingdom: Animalia
- Phylum: Chordata
- Class: Amphibia
- Order: Anura
- Family: Bufonidae
- Genus: Sclerophrys
- Species: S. pantherina

Binomial name
- Sclerophrys pantherina (Smith, 1828)

Synonyms
- Bufo pantherinus Smith, 1828; Bufo cruciger Schmidt, 1846; Amietophrynus pantherinus (Smith, 1828)

= Western leopard toad =

Species of amphibian

The western leopard toad (Sclerophrys pantherina) is a species of toad in the family Bufonidae. The species is endemic to the low-lying areas of the Cape Peninsula, the Cape Flats and the Agulhas flats of the Western Cape, South Africa.

== Populations and range ==
Two macro-populations exist, broadly referred to as the Cape Town and Overberg clusters. Its natural foraging habitat is Mediterranean-type shrubby vegetation, falling within several vegetation types including Cape Flats Sand Plain Fynbos and Cape Flats Dune Strandveld.

== Habitat ==
The species is not restricted to pristine habitat as much of its historical feeding grounds currently fall under residential suburbs, hence leopard toads are often found living in suburban gardens. Breeding habitat includes swamps, freshwater lakes, intermittent freshwater lakes, freshwater marshes, intermittent freshwater marshes, urban riverine watercourses, natural ponds and garden ponds.

== Threats ==
It is threatened by habitat loss, as well as other urban obstacles and barriers such as walls, electric fencing, canals and roads. Introduced or exotic fauna and flora like ducks, fish and algae threaten the quality of breeding habitat and the breeding success of populations. Cape Town is an expanding city with a population of close to 5 million people. There is thus an inherent integration of urban wildlife and humans in the city, especially with regards to the western leopard toad.

== Conservation measures ==
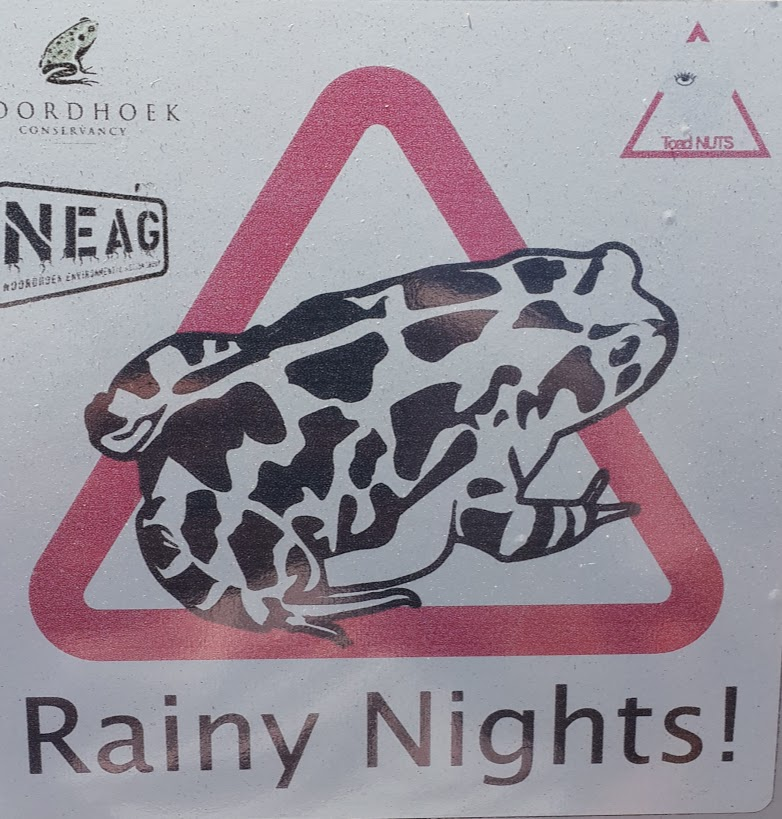

Volunteers thus play a critical role in conservation efforts for the species. These volunteers are mainly involved during breeding season migrations, which falls between late July and early September, timed with the arrival of the first post-winter warm weather. It is at this time when the highest number of individuals are threatened, as individuals cross busy roads to and from local breeding habitat. Large-scale efforts across the distribution incur over nights during this time to move toads over roads, collect data and flag down motorists. Since March 2011 road signs have also been placed at ten of these crossings to alert motorists. It is envisaged that the signs would encourage motorists to slow down and take heed of the amphibians, especially at night.
