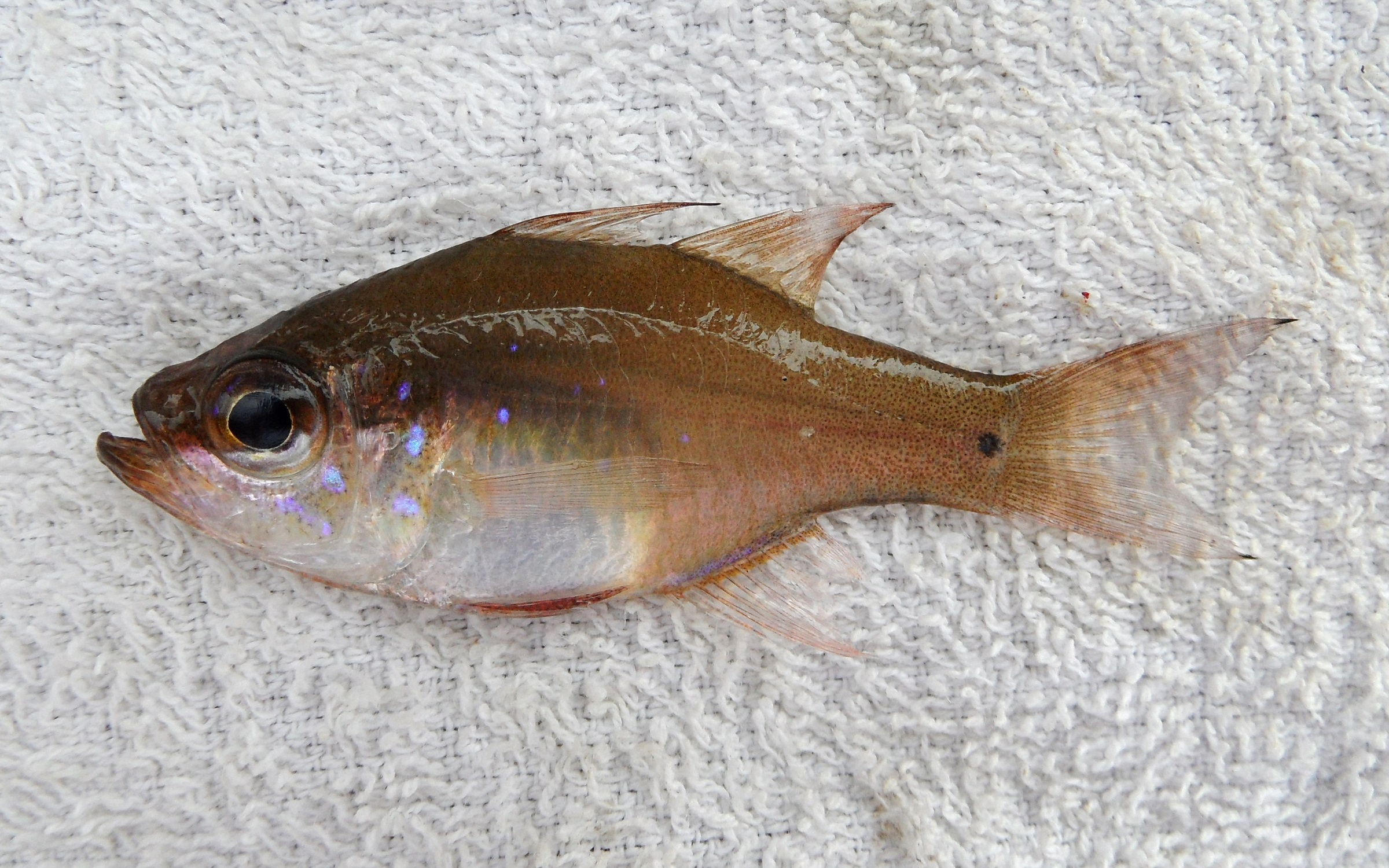

Conservation status
- Least Concern (IUCN 3.1)

Scientific classification
- Kingdom: Animalia
- Phylum: Chordata
- Class: Actinopterygii
- Division: Teleostei
- Order: Gobiiformes
- Family: Apogonidae
- Genus: Zoramia
- Species: Z. fragilis

Binomial name
- Zoramia fragilis (J. L. B. Smith, 1961)

Synonyms
- Apogon fragilis J. L. B. Smith, 1961

= Zoramia fragilis =

Species of fish

Zoramia fragilis, the fragile cardinalfish, is a species of marine ray-finned fish belonging to the family Apogonidae, the cardinalfishes. This cardinalfish is found in the Western Indian Ocean.

== Taxonomy ==
Zoramia fragilis was first formally described as Apogon fragilis in 1961 by the South African ichthyologist J. L. B. Smith with its type locality given as Pinda in Mozambique. This species is now classified in the genus Zoramia which was described by David Starr Jordan in 1917 with Apogon graeffii designated as its type species, as well as being the type species by monotypy. The genus Zoramia is placed, along with Fibramia, in the tribe Zoramiini within the subfamily Apogoninae. The family Apogonidae is in the suborder Apogonoidei in the order Gobiiformes.

== Etymology ==
Zoramia fragilis is classified in the genus Zoramia, the etymology of the name of this genus was not explained by Jordan but it may be that the prefic zor- is derived from zoros, which means "sheer" and may be a reference to the near transparent body of these fishes. The second part of the amia is a non binomial name originally coined by Laurens Theodorus Gronovius for the genus Apogon which is now used as a common suffix for genus names within the cardinalfish family. The specific name, fragilis, is Latin for "fragile" or "brittle", again this was not explained by Smith but he described this species as having "delicate" colours.

== Description ==
Zoramia fragilis short and deep body with a compressed cross section and it reaches a maximum total length of 5.5 cm (2.2 in), although a standard length of 4.3 cm (1.7 in) is more typical. The first dorsal fin contains 6 spines with the second and third spines rather elongated and maybe filametous, the second dorsal fin has a single spine and 8 soft rays and the anal fin has 2 spines and 9 soft rays. It has a transluscent body with a small dark spot on the caudal peduncle and blackish tips to the lobes ofthe caudal fin.

== Distribution and habitat ==
Zoramia fragilis is found in the Western Indian Ocean. It occurs along the southern coast of Mozambique, the Comoro Islands, Madagascar, the Seychelles and the Maldives. It is found at depths between 1 and 15 m (3 ft 3 in and 49 ft 3 in) sheltering in corals in sheltered lagoons and at night it moves onto sandy areas.
