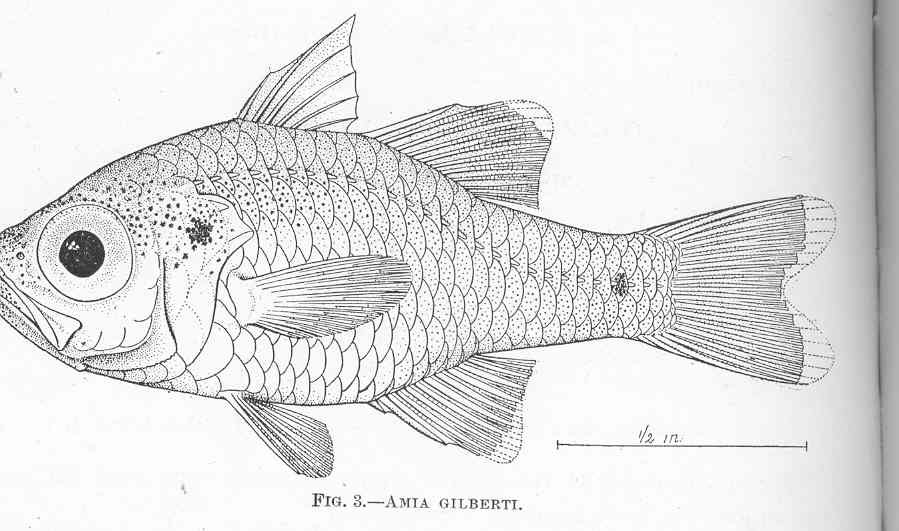

Conservation status
- Least Concern (IUCN 3.1)

Scientific classification
- Kingdom: Animalia
- Phylum: Chordata
- Class: Actinopterygii
- Division: Teleostei
- Order: Gobiiformes
- Family: Apogonidae
- Genus: Zoramia
- Species: Z. gilberti

Binomial name
- Zoramia gilberti (D. S. Jordan & Seale, 1905)

Synonyms
- Amia gilberti D. S. Jordan & Seale, 1905; Apogon gilberti (D. S. Jordan & Seale, 1905)

= Zoramia gilberti =

Species of fish

Zoramia gilberti, Gilbert's cardinalfish, is a species of marine ray-finned fish belonging to the family Apogonidae, the cardinalfishes. This cardinalfish is found in the Western Pacific Ocean.

== Taxonomy ==
Zoramia gilberti was first formally described as Amia gilberti in 1905 by the American ichthyologists David Starr Jordan and Alvin Seale with its type locality given as Negros in the Philippines. This species is now classified in the genus Zoramia which was described by David Starr Jordan in 1917 with Apogon graeffii designated as its type species, as well as being the type species by monotypy. The genus Zoramia is placed, along with Fibramia, in the tribe Zoramiini within the subfamily Apogoninae. The family Apogonidae is in the suborder Apogonoidei in the order Gobiiformes.

== Etymology ==
Zoramia gilberti is classified in the genus Zoramia, the etymology of the name of this genus was not explained by Jordan but it may be that the prefix zor- is derived from zoros, which means "sheer" and may be a reference to the near transparent body of these fishes. The second part of the amia is a non binomial name originally coined by Laurens Theodorus Gronovius for the genus Apogon which is now used as a common suffix for genus names within the cardinalfish family. The specific name, gilberti, honours the American ichthyologist Charles Henry Gilbert, Jordan's colleague at Stanford University, who gave Jordan "material assistance in the comparison of specimens”.

== Description ==
Zoramia gilberti has a short, deep body with a compressed cross section and it reaches a maximum total length of 5.5 cm (2.2 in). The first dorsal fin has 6 spines, the second has a single spine and 9 soft rays while the anal fin has 2 spines and 8 soft rays. This species is translucent pale brown with blue spots on the head and front part of the body with a silvery bluish belly, and a dusky caudal peduncle which has a small black spot.

== Distribution and habitat ==
Zoramia gilberti is found in the Western Pacific Ocean from Sabah, Malaysia through eastern Indonesia to the Solomon Islands, north to the Philippines, south to Scott and Seringapatam Reefs off northwestern Australia, including Palau and Yap. This cardinalfish is encountered in pairs or small shoals on rich coral crests in sheltered lagoons within reefs.
