= Fibramia thermalis =

Conservation status
- Least Concern (IUCN 3.1)

Scientific classification
- Kingdom: Animalia
- Phylum: Chordata
- Class: Actinopterygii
- Division: Teleostei
- Order: Gobiiformes
- Family: Apogonidae
- Genus: Fibramia
- Species: F. thermalis

Binomial name
- Fibramia thermalis (G. Cuvier, 1829)

Synonyms
- Apogon thermalis Cuvier, 1829; Ostorhinchus thermalis (Cuvier, 1829); Apogon sangiensis Bleeker, 1857

Species of fish

Fibramia thermalis, the half-barred cardinal or Sangi cardinalfish, is a species of marine ray-finned fish belonging to the family Apogonidae, the cardinalfishes. This cardinalfish is found in the Indian and Pacific Oceans.

== Taxonomy ==
Fibramia thermalis was first formally described in 1829 in the 3rd volume of Histoire naturelle des poissons by the French zoologist Geoges Cuvier with its type locality given as sources of hot waters of Cania, Sri Lanka. In 1974 Kohji Mabuchi, Thomas Henry Fraser, Hayeun Song, Yoichiro Azuma and Mutsumi Nishida described the new genus Fibramia and designated Apogon thermalis as its type species. At the same time Mabuchi et al described a new tribe Zoramiini which contains Fibramia and Zoramia within the subfamily Apogoninae. The family Apogonidae is in the suborder Apogonoidei in the order Gobiiformes.

== Etymology ==
Fibramia thermalis is the type species of the genus Fibramia, this name combines the Latin fibra, meaning "thread" or "filament", an allusion to the elongated second dorsal fin spine of this species and the slender light-coloured or dark mid-line on the bodies of F. amboinensis and F. lateralis with Amia, a non binomial name originally coined by Laurens Theodorus Gronovius for the genus Apogon which is now used as a common suffix for genus names within the cardinalfish family. The specific name, thermalis, is Neo-Latin for "of or relating to hot springs or water", a reference to the Cania hot springs in Sri Lanka, the type locality.

== Description ==
Fibramia thermalis has an elongated body with a compressed cross section and recahes a total length of 8.5 cm (3.3 in). The first dorsal fin contains 6 spines, the second dorsal fin has a single spine and 9 soft rays and the anal fin has 2 spines and 8 soft rays. The overall colour is brownish, varying to purplish sometimes, with a whitish underside, a wide dark stripe runs through the eye, the dorsal fin has a black margin at its front margin and there are 2 or 3 very small black spots along the base of the dorsal fin. The Juveniles are transluscent with a black spot on the base of the caudal fin.

== Distribution and habitat ==
Fibramia thermalis has a wide Indo-Pacific distribution. They occur off Mozambique and KwaZulu-Natal in southeastern Africa, the Comoros, Madagascar, the Syechelles, the Maldives, the Lakshadweep Islands, Sri Lanka, Bangladesh, the Andaman and Nicobar Islands, Singapore, Vietnam, the Ryukyu Islands of Japan, Palau, Yap and Chuuk in Micronesia, Indonesia, Papua New Guinea, Vanuatu and Australia. In Australia it is found on Cartier Island and the northern Great Barrier Reef. This species is found at depths down to 20 m (66 ft), The Sangi cardinalfish is found on coastal reefs, forming small schools near reef outcrops or where there are rocks and corals in sheltered lagoons with shallow water. This species is also one of the few cardinalfishes which can be euryhaline and small schools of this fish may be found in small tidal streams, river mouths and estuaries.
