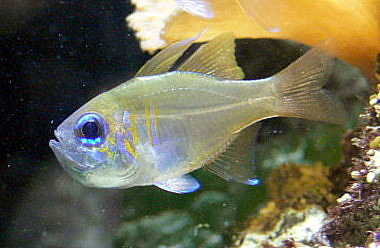

Conservation status
- Least Concern (IUCN 3.1)

Scientific classification
- Kingdom: Animalia
- Phylum: Chordata
- Class: Actinopterygii
- Division: Teleostei
- Order: Gobiiformes
- Family: Apogonidae
- Genus: Zoramia
- Species: Z. leptacanthus

Binomial name
- Zoramia leptacanthus (Bleeker, 1856)

Synonyms
- Apogon leptacanthus Bleeker, 1856; Zoramia leptacantha (Bleeker 1856); Apogon arenatus Bleeker, 1860; Apogon graeffi Günther, 1873

= Threadfin cardinalfish =

Species of fish

The threadfin cardinalfish (Zoramia leptacanthus), the longspine cardinalfish or bluestreak cardinalfish, is a species of marine ray-finned fish belonging to the family Apogonidae, the cardinalfishes. This cardinalfish is found in the Indian and Pacific Oceans.

== Taxonomy ==
The threadfin cardinal fish was first formally described as Apogon leptacanthus in 1856 by the Dutch physician, herpetologist and ichthyologist Pieter Bleeker with its type locality given as Ternate, Molucca Islands, Indonesia. This species is now classified in the genus Zoramia which was described by David Starr Jordan in 1917 with Apogon graeffi, which had been described in 1873 by Albert Günther from the Marshall Islands, designated as its type species, as well as being its type species by monotypy. A. graeffi is now considered to be a synonym of Z. leptacanthus. The genus Zoramia is placed, along with Fibramia, in the tribe Zoramiini within the subfamily Apogoninae. The family Apogonidae is in the suborder Apogonoidei in the order Gobiiformes.

== Etymology ==
The threadfin cardinalfish is the type species of the genus Zoramia, the etymology of the name of this genus was not explained by Jordan but it may be that the prefix zor- is derived from zoros, which means "sheer" and may be a reference to the near transparent body of these fishes. The second part of the amia is a non binomial name originally coined by Laurens Theodorus Gronovius for the genus Apogon which is now used as a common suffix for genus names within the cardinalfish family. The specific name, letpacanthus, is a noun in apposition and means "slender thorn" or "slender spine", an allusion to the elongated first dorsal fin spine.

== Description ==
The threadfin cardinalfish has a short, deep body with a compressed cross section and it reaches a maximum total length of 6 cm (2.4 in). The first dorsal fin has 6 spines with the second spine being filamentous, the second has a single spine and 9 soft rays while the anal fin has 2 spines and 8 soft rays. This species is translucent, with bright blue and orange bars on the back of the head and the front of the body, and with a whitish line along the back.

== Distribution and habitat ==
The threadfin cardinalfish occurs in the Indian Ocean (including the Red Sea) and the western Pacific, west to East Africa and the Seychelles, east to Marshall Islands, Tonga and Samoa, north to the Ryukyu Islands, and south to Australia, Micronesia and New Caledonia. In Australian waters it is found at the Cocos (Keeling) Islands, Ashmore Reef, offshore refs in Western Australia and the northern Great Barrier Reef. It inhabits sheltered bays (sometimes in turbid areas) and reef lagoons and forms dense schools, often with other cardinalfishes.

== Behaviour ==
Threadfin cardinalfishes gathers in larges schools around staghorn coral outcrops in reefs and sandflats. It frequently joins in mixed cardinalfish schools with other species, usually Taeniamia fucata and T. zosterophora. In Papua New Guinea and the Great Barrier reef the threadfin cardinalfish is exclusively associated with the coral Porites cylindrica while off Ishigaki Island in the Ryukyus it was observed hiding among thespines of sea urchins in the genus Diadema. This speceis forms dsitinct pairs which are not territorial but do have a home range. They are mouthbrooders.
