= S. inornatus =

S. inornatus may refer to:

- Samariscus inornatus, a flounder species in the genus Samariscus
- Scelotes inornatus, a skink species in the genus Scelotes

== See also ==
- Inornatus
