= Cape Flats Dune Strandveld =

Endangered vegetation type endemic to the coastal areas around Cape Town

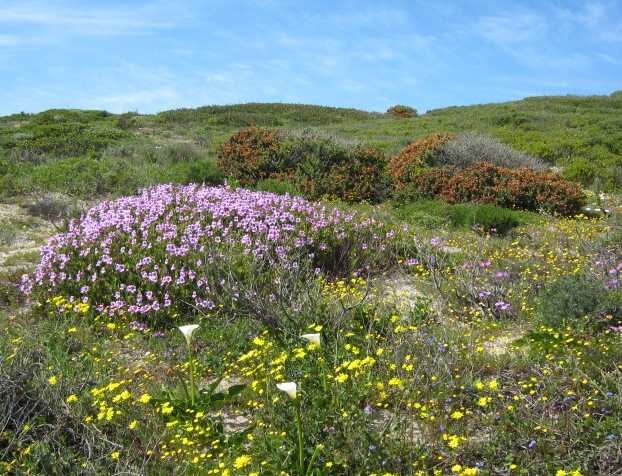
Cape Flats Dune Strandveld growing on the sand dunes of False Bay, Cape Town.

Cape Flats Dune Strandveld is an endangered vegetation type. This is a unique type of Cape Strandveld that is endemic to the coastal areas around Cape Town, South Africa, including the Cape Flats.

== Habitat ==
Strandveld means “beach scrub” in the Afrikaans language. It covers and stabilises sand dunes on the beaches around Cape Town, and is incredibly colourful in spring when it bursts into flower. It supports a very high biomass of browsing animals, and in the past it was grazed by large herds.

The strongly alkaline, calcareous dune sand of the coast lies over a base of older limestone. In some places, this limestone juts out of the dune sand, and forms impressive beach cliffs. Succulents form a high proportion of Strandveld plants, consequently, fires are much less common in Strandveld than in the neighbouring Fynbos vegetation.

Cape Flats Dune Strandveld is endangered. More than half of the Cape’s Strandveld has been lost to urbanisation and the building of beach resorts, and only 14 percent of this unique vegetation type is actually conserved.

Habitat preserves

Nature preserves with Cape Flats Dune Strandveld habitat include:

- Blaauwberg Conservation Area
- Edith Stephens Wetland Park
- Rondevlei Nature Reserve
- Wolfgat Nature Reserve

== Flora ==
Cape Strandveld vegetation is typically composed of areas of tall, evergreen shrubs, with great numbers of bulbs, grasses, succulents and annual flowers growing in between. Historically, dense forests of large Milkwood trees used to exist at Noordhoek, Olifantsbos, Macassar and Gordons Bay.

Plants that are naturally found in Cape Strandveld include shrubs such as Chrysanthemoides monilifera, Olea exasperata, Metalasia muricata, Roepera flexuosum, Rhus laevigata and Rhus glauca; succulents such as Sour figs (Carpobrotus acinaciformis and Carpobrotus edulis) and Mesembryanthemum species; Restios; herbs such as geraniums and a great variety of daisies (Senecio elegans, Senecio burchellii, Dimorphotheca pluvialis and many others).

Larger trees that are indigenous to coastal Strandveld include:

- Milkwood (Sideroxylon inerme)
- Sea guarri (Euclea racemosa)
- Cape Camphor tree (Tarchonanthus camphoratus)
- Candlewood (Pterocelastrus tricuspidatus)
- Wild olive (Olea europea subsp. africana)
- Coastal silkybark (Robsonodendron maritimum)

There are also endemic plant species such as Lampranthus tenuifolius.

The most similar vegetation types to CFDS are Langebaan Dune Strandveld and Overberg Dune Strandveld .

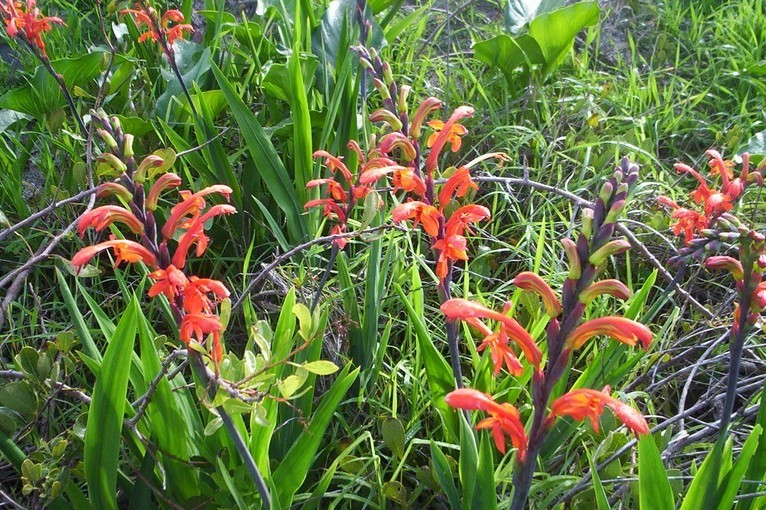
Flowering geophytes are common in Cape Strandveld.

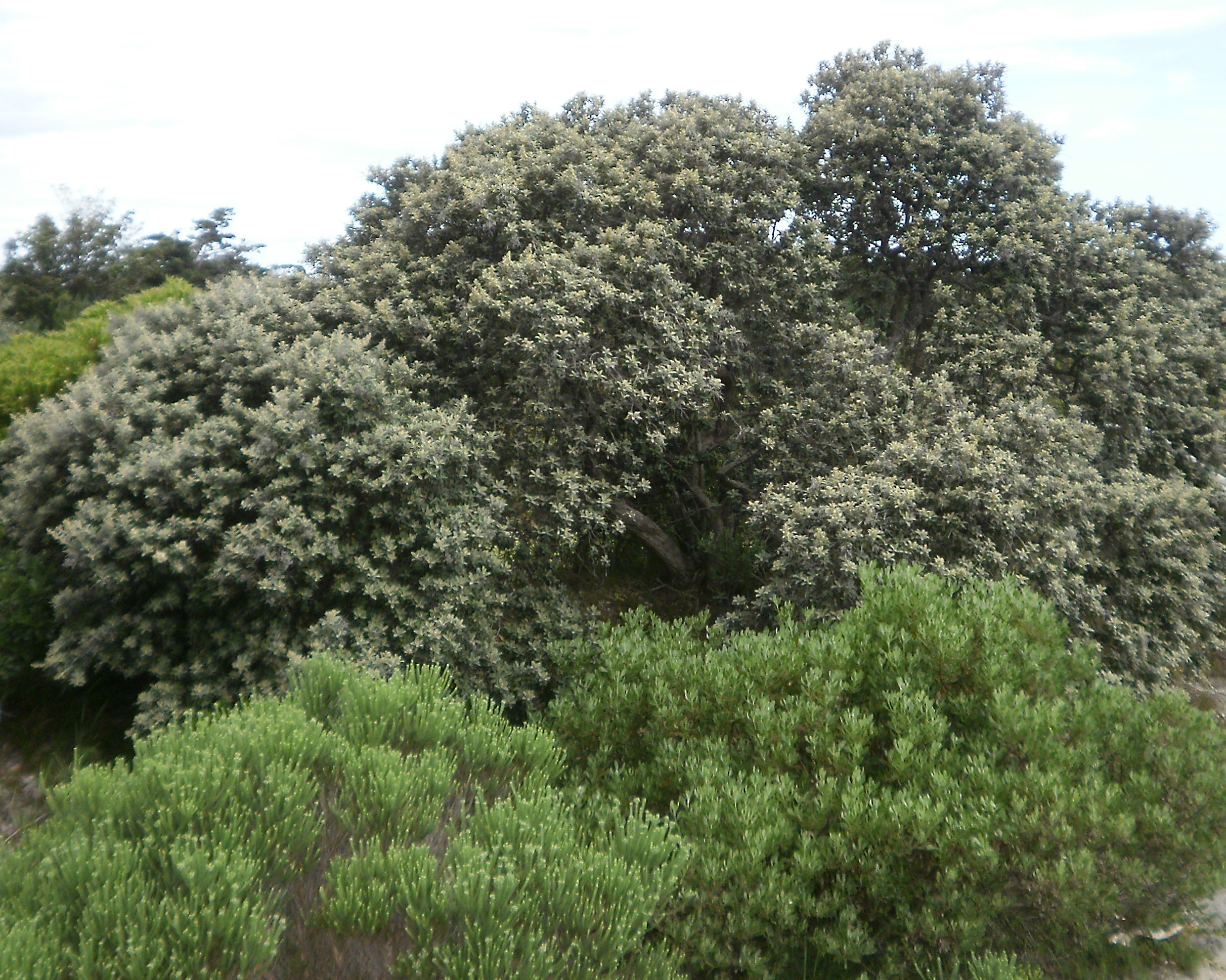
The Cape Camphor tree (Tarchonanthus camphoratus) naturally occurs in Strandveld.

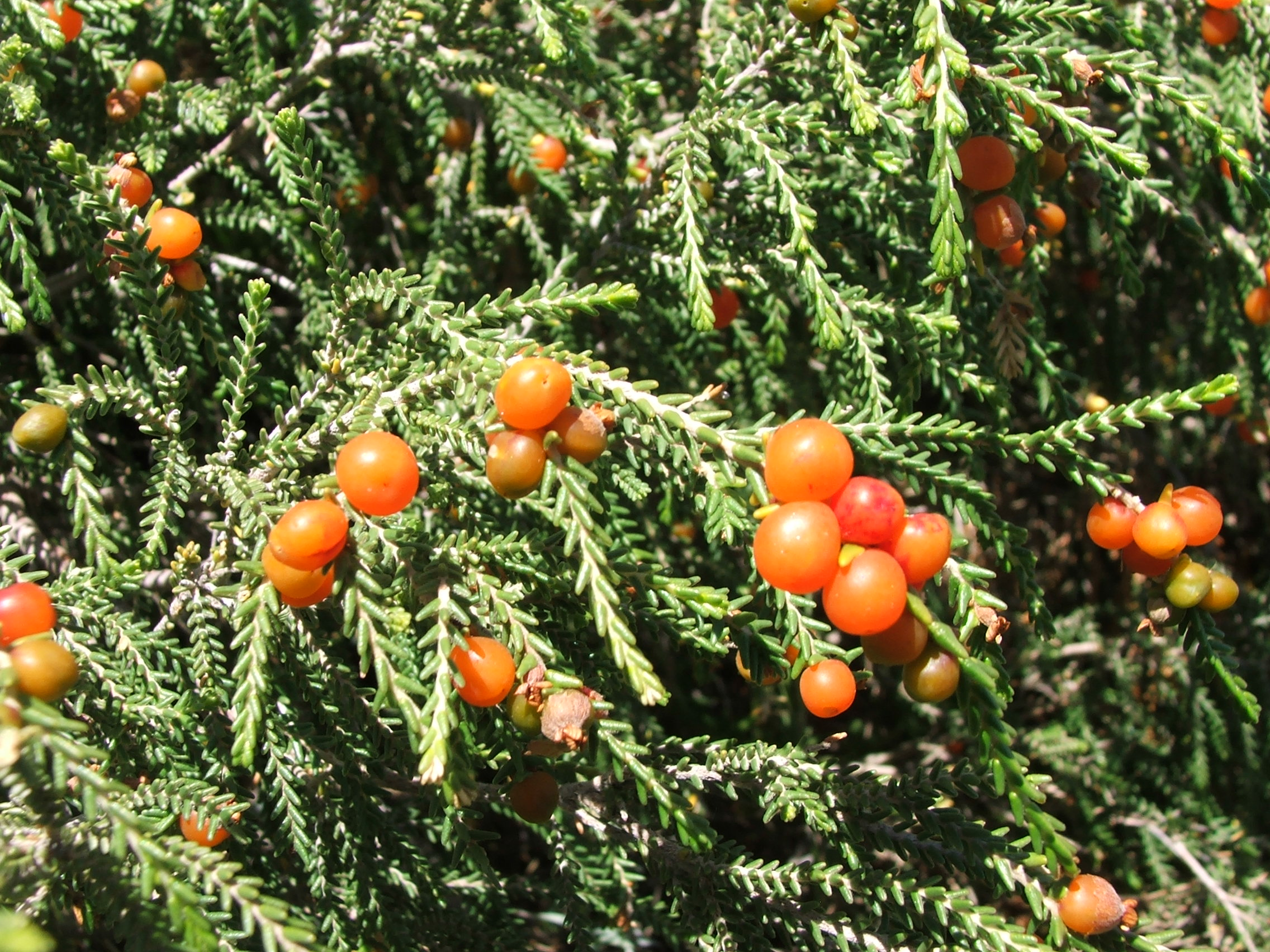
The Christmas-berry Plant, a Cape Flats Dune Strandveld plant.

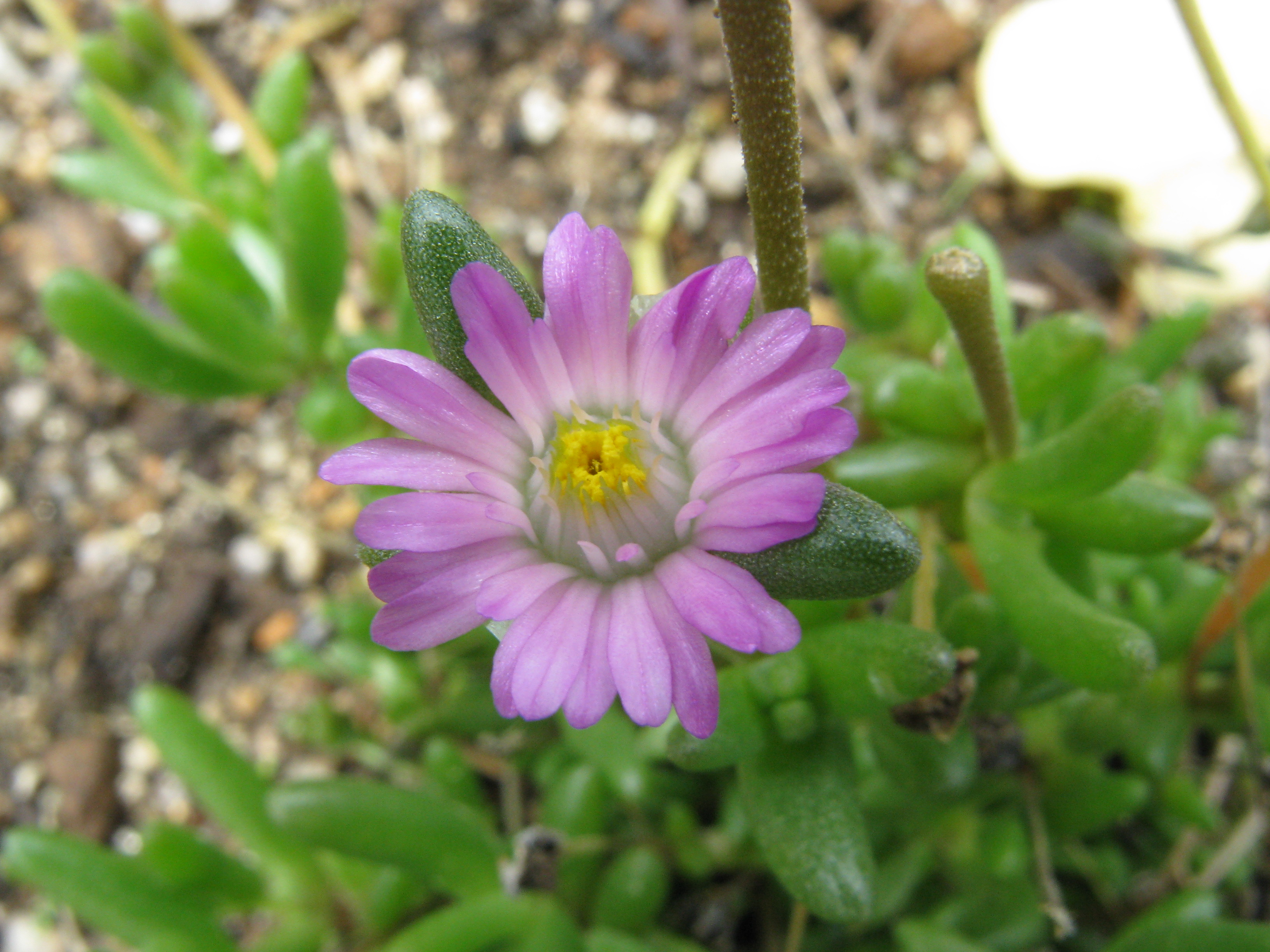
Lampranthus tenuifolius, an endemic plant.

== See also ==
- Biodiversity of Cape Town
- Cape Flats Sand Fynbos
- Cape Floristic Region
- Cape Lowland Freshwater Wetland
- List of nature reserves in Cape Town
- Category:Fynbos - habitats and species.
