= Scelotes capensis =

Conservation status
- Least Concern (IUCN 3.1)

Scientific classification
- Kingdom: Animalia
- Phylum: Chordata
- Class: Reptilia
- Order: Squamata
- Suborder: Scinciformata
- Infraorder: Scincomorpha
- Family: Scincidae
- Genus: Scelotes
- Species: S. capensis

Binomial name
- Scelotes capensis (Smith, 1849)

Species of reptile

Scelotes capensis, the western dwarf burrowing skink or cape burrowing skink, is a species of lizard which is found in South Africa and Namibia.
