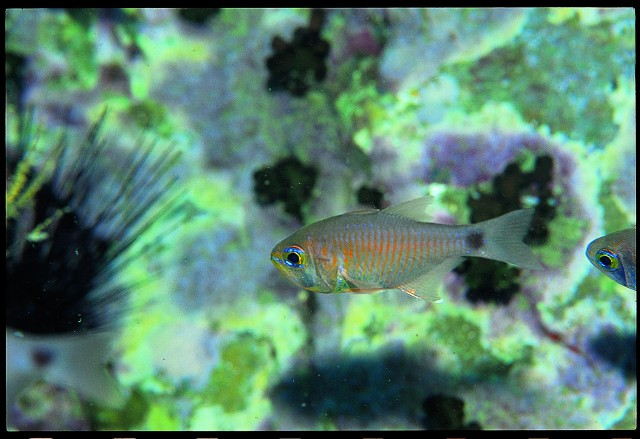

Conservation status
- Least Concern (IUCN 3.1)

Scientific classification
- Kingdom: Animalia
- Phylum: Chordata
- Class: Actinopterygii
- Division: Teleostei
- Order: Gobiiformes
- Family: Apogonidae
- Genus: Taeniamia
- Species: T. fucata

Binomial name
- Taeniamia fucata (Cantor, 1849)

Synonyms
- Apogon fucatus Cantor, 1849; Archamia fucata (Cantor, 1849); Apogon macropteroides Bleeker, 1853

= Taeniamia fucata =

Species of fish

Taeniamia fucata, the orangelined cardinalfish, painted cardinalfish, narrowlined cardinalfish or redbarred cardinalfish, is a species of marine ray-finned fish belonging to the family Apogonidae, the cardinalfishes. This cardinalfish is found in the Indian and western Pacific Oceans.

== Taxonomy ==
Taeniamia fucata was first formally described as Apogon fucatus in 1849 by the Danish zoologist Theodore Cantor with its type locality given as the Penang area, Malaysia, Strait of Malacca, eastern Indian Ocean. This species is now classified in the genus Taeniamia, which was described in 2013 by Thomas Henry Fraser with Archamia leai designated as its type species. The genus Taeniamia along with Archamia, is placed in the tribe Archamiini within the subfamily Apogoninae. The family Apogonidae is in the suborder Apogonoidei in the order Gobiiformes.

Taeniamia sansibarica of the Western Indian Ocean has been considered to be a synonym of this species but is now considered to be a valid species.

== Etymology ==
Taeniamia fucata is classified in the genus Taeniamia, which combines taenia, derived from tainía, meaning "band" or "ribbon", with Amia. The first is a reference to the vertically wide bars and near-vertical to curved slender bars creating lines on most of the members of this genus. Amia, in this case, is a non binomial name originally coined by Laurens Theodorus Gronovius for the genus Apogon which is now used as a common suffix for genus names within the cardinalfish family. The specific name, fucata, is Latin for "painted" or "coloured", thought to refer to , the body and fins, other than the pectoral fins, are “silvery carmine with rainbow reflections”.

== Description ==
Taeniamia fucata has a short and deep body with a compressed cross section. It reaches a maximum total length of 10 cm (3.9 in), although a standard length of 5.9 cm (2.3 in) is more typical> The first dorsal fin contains 7 spines, the second dorsal fin has a single spine and 9 soft rays while the anal fin has 2 spines and between 15 and 18 soft rays. This is a semitransparent greyish fish that has an orange head, a dense pattern of thin orange almost vertical lines along the flanks, a big black spot on the caudal peduncle, two blue stripes running from the eye onto the snout and the anal fin has a white tip.

== Distribution and habitat ==
Taeniamia fucata has a wide Indo-West Pacific range from the Red Sea and eastern coast of Africa, the Anadaman Sea and the Maly Archipelago east to the Samoan Islands, north to the Ogasawara Islands and southern Japan, south to northern Australia and New Caledonia. This is a coastal fish of reefs and reef lagoons where it is nocturnal, typically gathering dense schools above branching corals or around the entrances to caves during the day.
