= Scelotes anguinus =

Conservation status
- Least Concern (IUCN 3.1)

Scientific classification
- Kingdom: Animalia
- Phylum: Chordata
- Class: Reptilia
- Order: Squamata
- Suborder: Scinciformata
- Infraorder: Scincomorpha
- Family: Scincidae
- Genus: Scelotes
- Species: S. anguinus

Binomial name
- Scelotes anguinus (Boulenger, 1887)

Species of reptile

Scelotes anguinus, the Algoa dwarf burrowing skink or Boulenger's burrowing skink, is a species of lizard which is endemic to South Africa. Note that the correct name for this species is anguinus. The name anguineus is a synonym of a different species Scelotes bipes.
