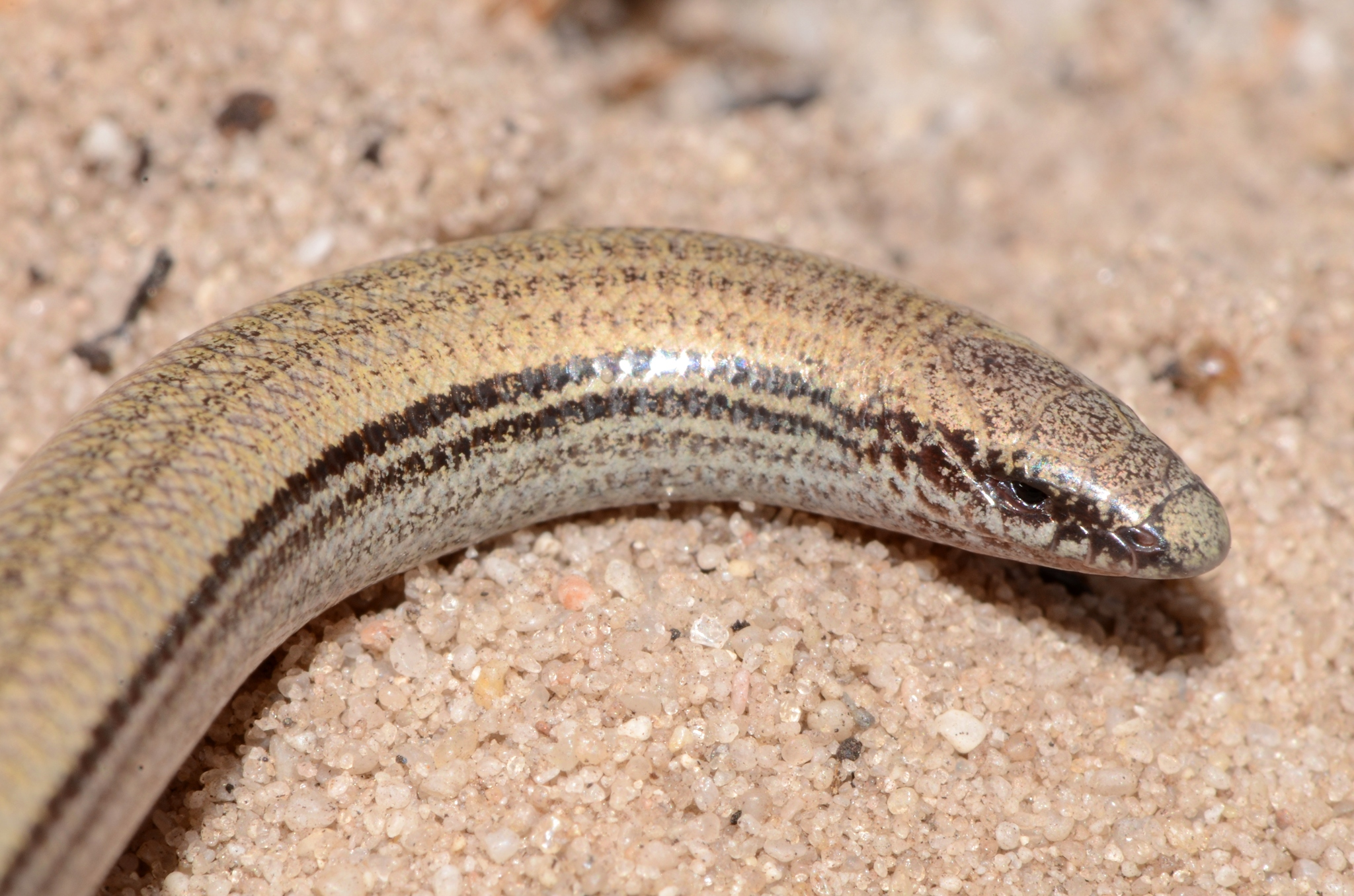

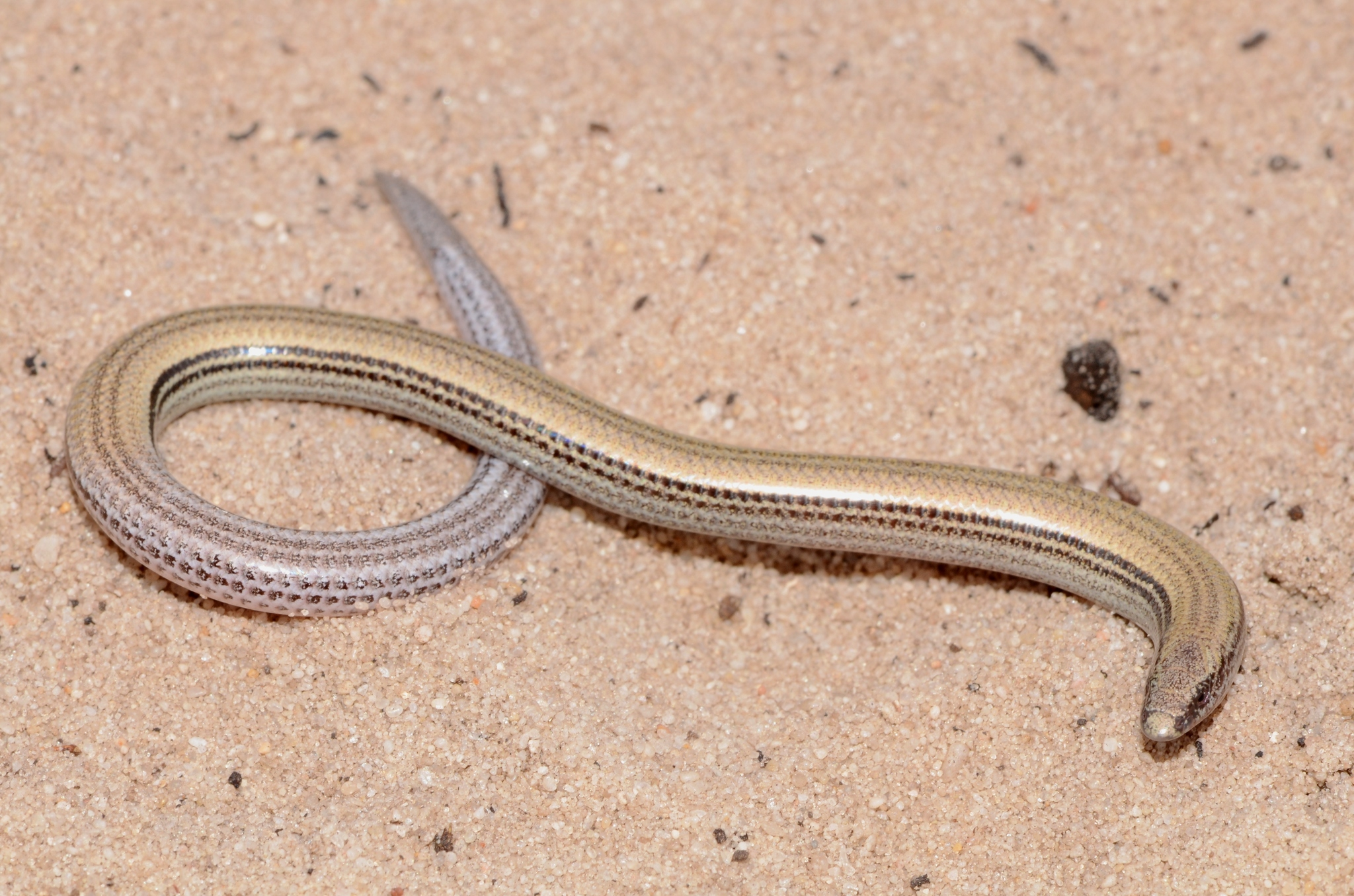

Conservation status
- Near Threatened (IUCN 3.1)

Scientific classification
- Kingdom: Animalia
- Phylum: Chordata
- Class: Reptilia
- Order: Squamata
- Family: Scincidae
- Genus: Scelotes
- Species: S. gronovii

Binomial name
- Scelotes gronovii (Daudin, 1802)

Synonyms
- Seps gronovii Daudin, 1802; Scelotes gronovii — Brygoo, 1985

= Gronovi's dwarf burrowing skink =

Species of lizard

Gronovi's dwarf burrowing skink (Scelotes gronovii) is a species of skink, a lizard in the family Scincidae. The species is endemic to South Africa.

== Etymology ==
Both the specific name, gronovii, and the common name are in honour of Dutch naturalist Laurens Theodorus Gronovius.

== Description ==
S. gronovii has no front legs, and each back leg has only one toe. The snout-to-vent length (SVL) of adults is usually 5–6 cm (2.0–2.4 in), and the maximum recorded SVL is 7 cm (2.8 in).

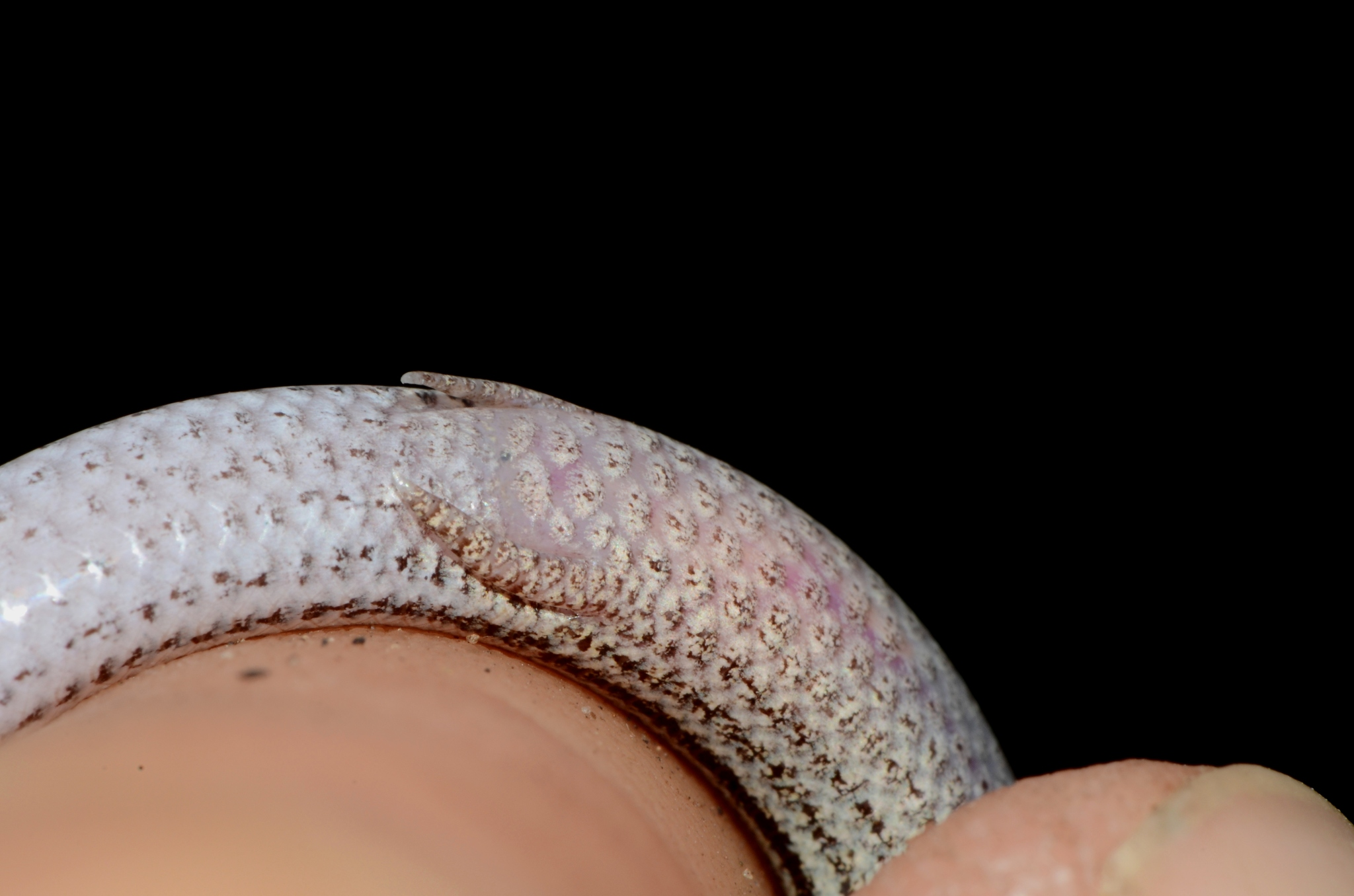
Back legs with one toe.

== Habitat ==
The preferred natural habitat of S. gronovii is sparse sandy shrubland in the southwestern coastal margins of the Western Cape (including Dassen Island), at altitudes below 100 m (330 ft).

== Behaviour ==
S. gronovii is terrestrial and fossorial.

== Reproduction ==
S. gronovii is ovoviviparous. A litter consists of one or two newborns, each of which has a total length (including tail) of 4–5 cm (1.6–2.0 in).
