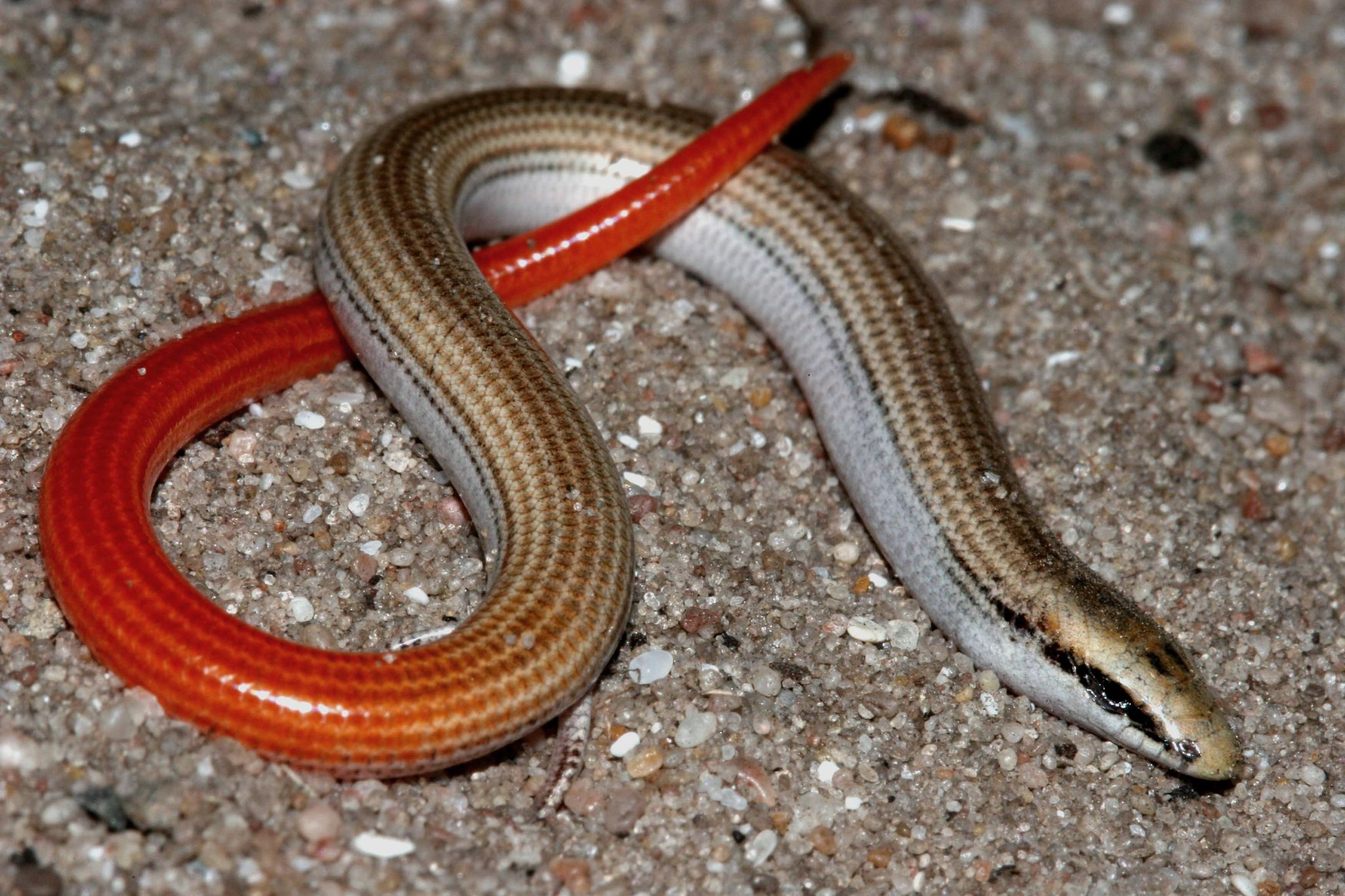

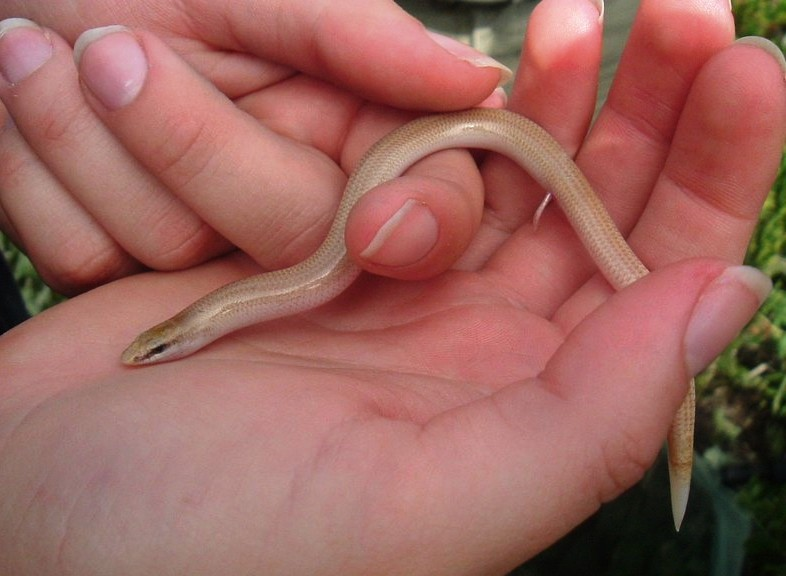
- S. montispectus in the Blaauwberg Conservation Area

Conservation status
- Near Threatened (IUCN 3.1)

Scientific classification
- Kingdom: Animalia
- Phylum: Chordata
- Class: Reptilia
- Order: Squamata
- Family: Scincidae
- Genus: Scelotes
- Species: S. montispectus

Binomial name
- Scelotes montispectus Bauer, Whiting & Sadlier, 2003

= Scelotes montispectus =

Species of reptile

Scelotes montispectus, the Bloubergstrand dwarf burrowing skink, is a species of skink which is endemic to southwestern South Africa.

== Distribution ==
S. montispectus has only been found in a few areas around beach-front dunes near Atlantis and the West Coast National Park in the Western Cape.
