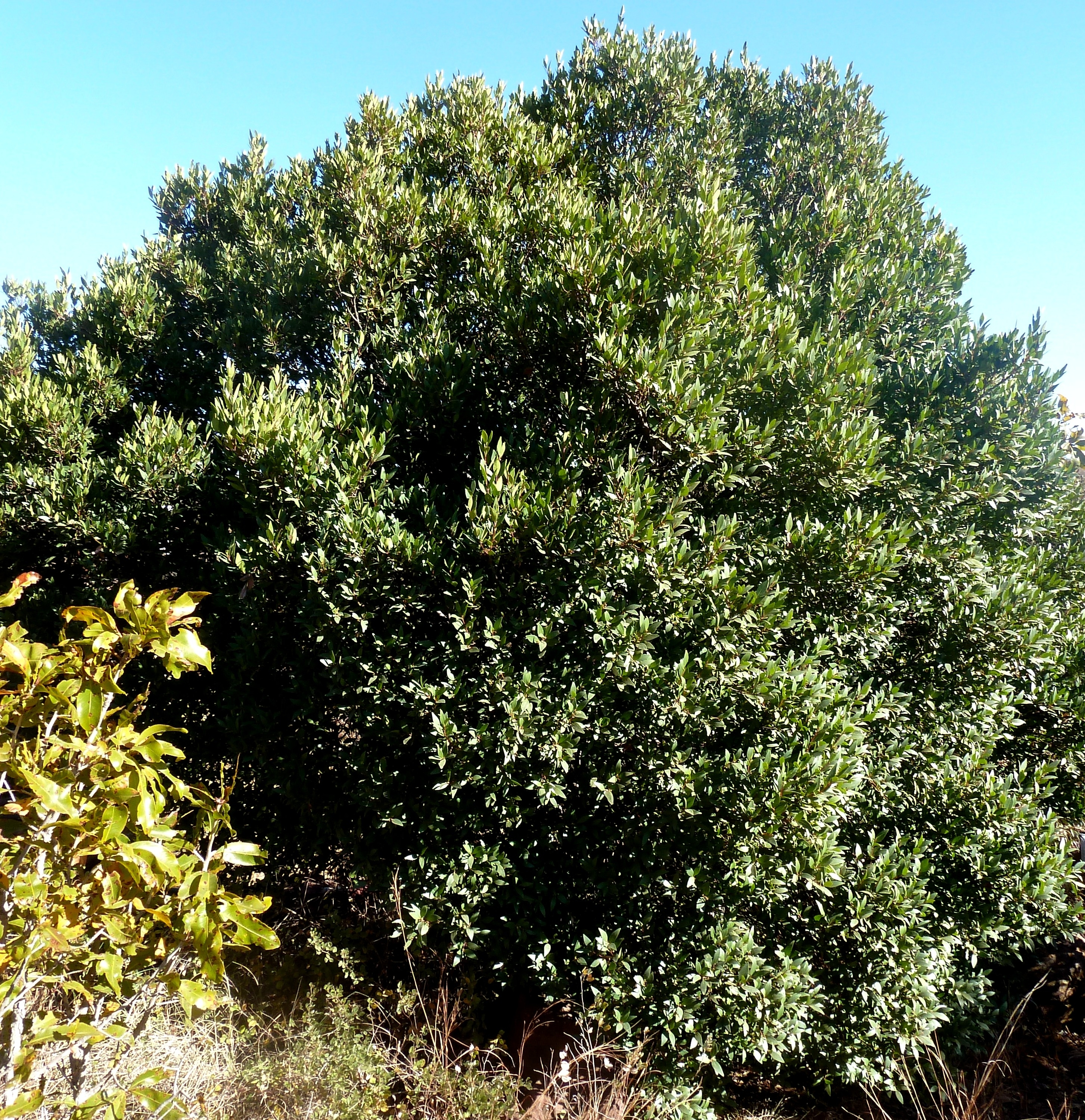

Scientific classification
- Kingdom: Plantae
- Clade: Tracheophytes
- Clade: Angiosperms
- Clade: Eudicots
- Clade: Rosids
- Order: Celastrales
- Family: Celastraceae
- Genus: Pterocelastrus
- Species: P. echinatus

Binomial name
- Pterocelastrus echinatus N.E.Br.

Synonyms
- Pterocelastrus rehmannii Davidson; Pterocelastrus variabilis sensu Sim; Gymnosporia nyasica Burtt Davy & Hutch.; Pterocelastrus galpinii Loes.

= Pterocelastrus echinatus =

White cherrywood

Species of tree

Pterocelastrus echinatus ('pterocelastrus' = winged holly, 'echinatus' = spiny) is a small Southern African tree occurring in South Africa, Mozambique, Zimbabwe, Eswatini, and Malawi. This species is found in montane and submontane evergreen forests, forest margins, rocky hillsides, and kloofs, growing between 600 and 2400 m above sea level.

Also known as white cherrywood or witkersiehout, this species is found as a shrub or small tree. It has pale grey bark, with bright orange underbark on young shoots which are angular with spirally arranged, entire, glabrous leaves, elliptic to lanceolate, somewhat leathery and glossy, dark green above, and paler below, margins often revolute. Petioles may be up to 8 mm long, often with a wine-red colour extending into the midrib. Fragrant flowers are small, white to cream, and in axillary clusters. The fruit is a three-celled woody dehiscent capsule 6–8 mm long, yellow to orange to red when mature, each valve with one to three bluntly pointed to winglike protuberances and each seed almost entirely enveloped by an aril. The venerable Kew taxonomist N. E. Brown first published his description of P. echinatus in 1906 in the 'Bulletin of Miscellaneous Information Kew' 1906: 16. (Bull. Misc. Inform. Kew)

The wood and roots produce resin which was used by Bantu tribes for attaching spear heads to the shafts. The attractive wood is pink to red in colour, resembling European cherry wood (Prunus avium), and is dense and moderately durable. In the past, it was used in wagon-building for pivot-plates (schamels) and spokes. It is suitable for turnery and cabinet-making.

The tree is host to a number of moth species from the family Geometridae - Aphilopota patulata, A. subalbata, Drepanogynis costipicta, and D. olearis.

== Gallery ==
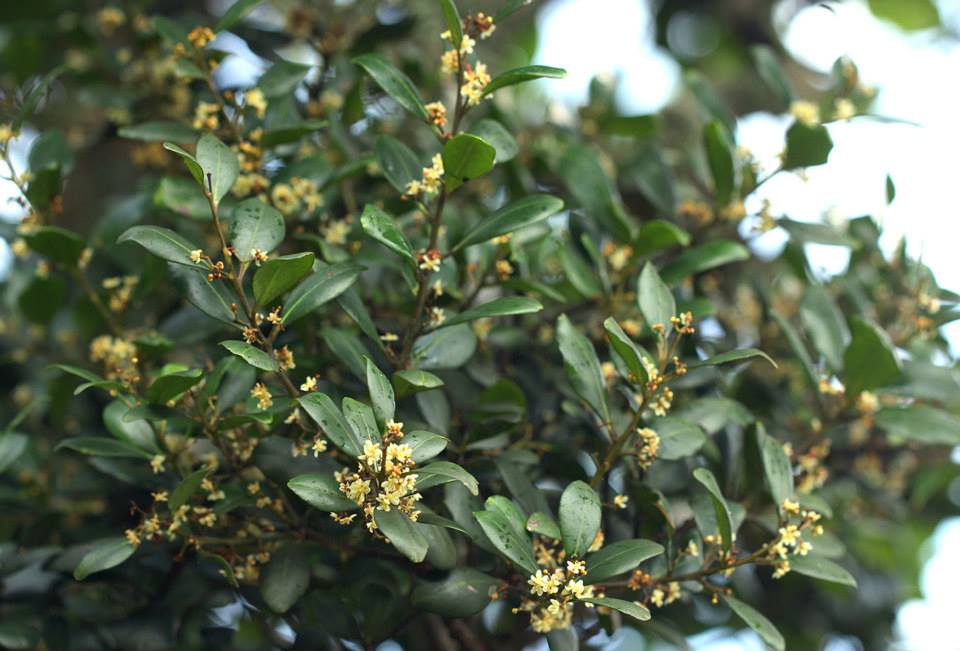
foliage and flowers

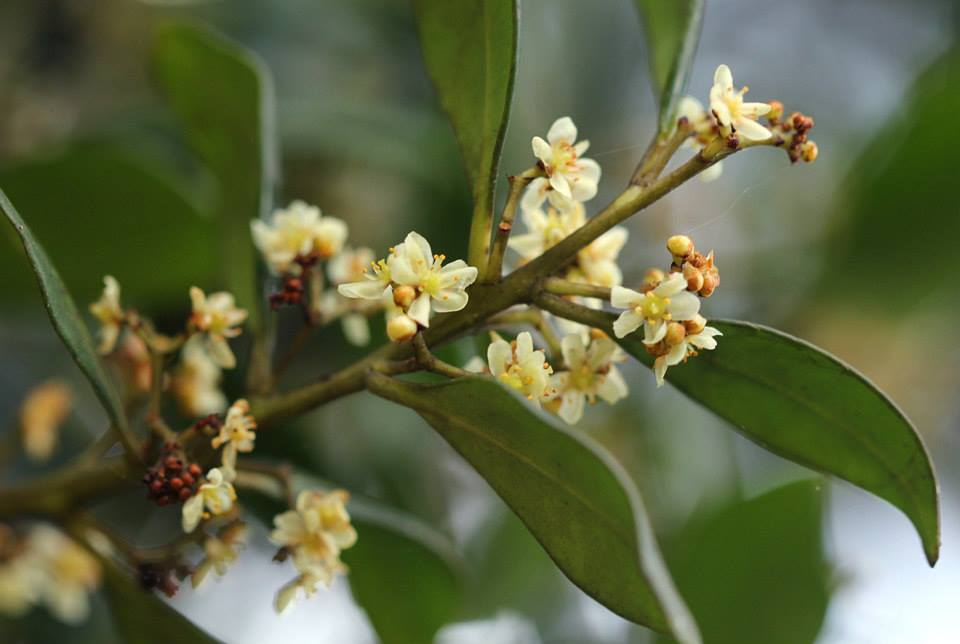
flowering sprig

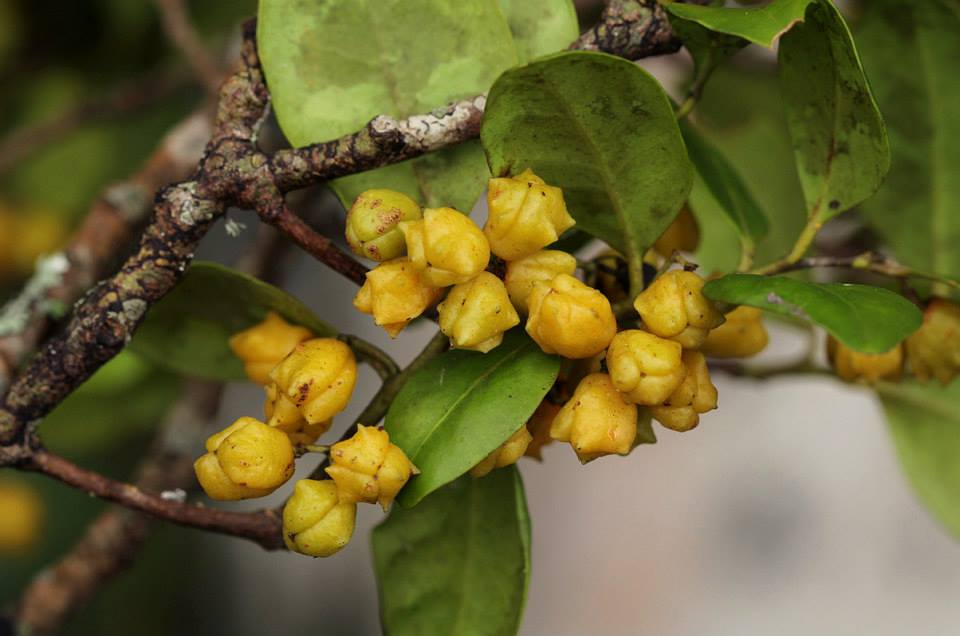
fruit
