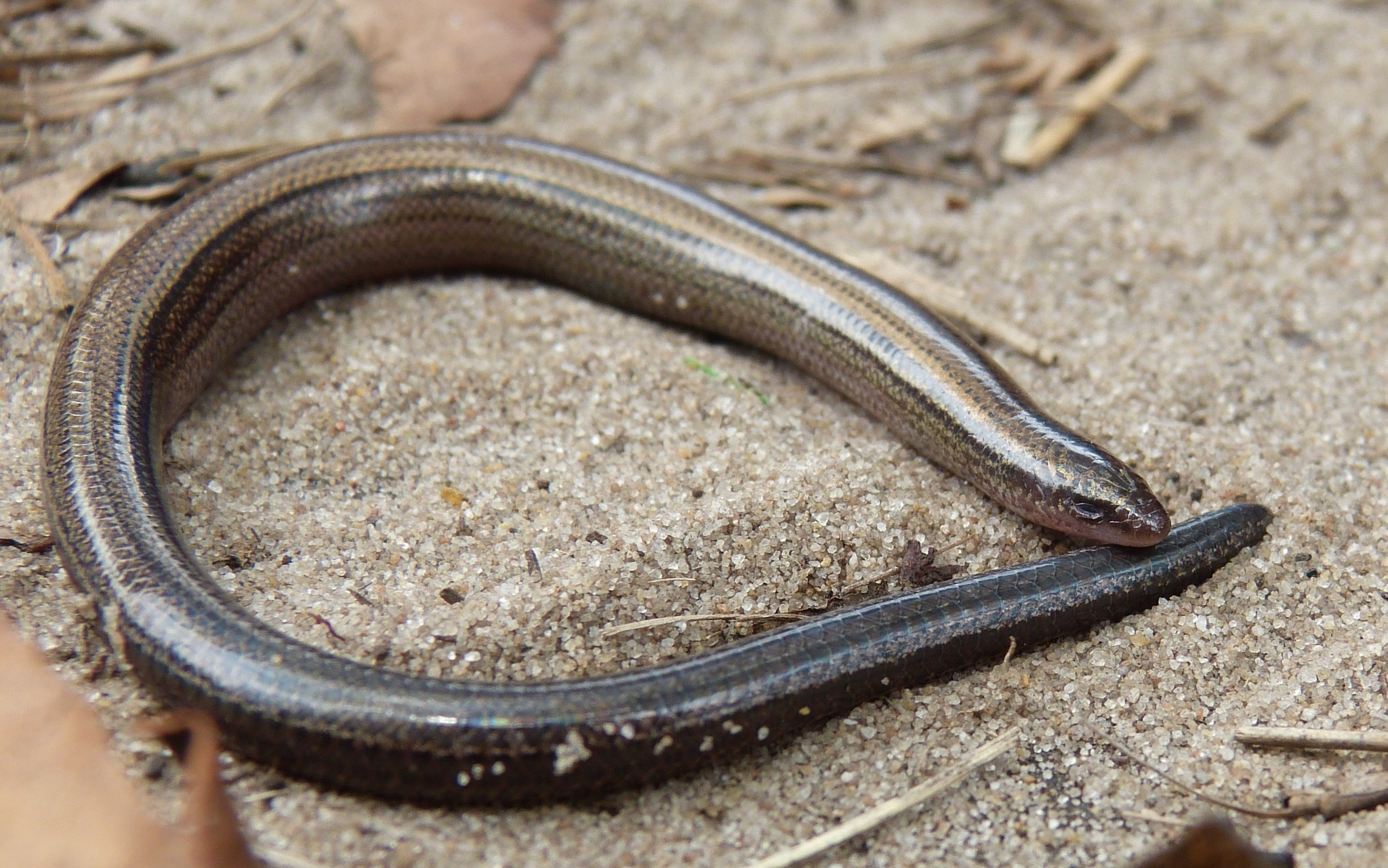

Conservation status
- Least Concern (IUCN 3.1)

Scientific classification
- Kingdom: Animalia
- Phylum: Chordata
- Class: Reptilia
- Order: Squamata
- Family: Scincidae
- Genus: Scelotes
- Species: S. fitzsimonsi

Binomial name
- Scelotes fitzsimonsi Broadley, 1994

= Scelotes fitzsimonsi =

Species of reptile

Scelotes fitzsimonsi, commonly known as Fitzsimons' dwarf burrowing skink, is a species of lizard in the family Scincidae. The species is indigenous to southern Africa.

== Etymology ==
The specific name, fitzsimonsi, is in honor of South African herpetologist (Mr.) Vivian Frederick Maynard FitzSimons.

== Description ==
S. fitzsimonsi has neither front legs nor back legs. Dorsally, it is light bronze on the body and bluish gray on the tail. Ventrally, it is greyish white. Adults have a snout-to-vent length (SVL) of 4.5–6.5 cm (1.8–2.6 in). The tail length is equal to or slightly greater than SVL.

== Distribution and habitat ==
S. fitzsimonsi is found in Mozambique and South Africa.

The preferred natural habitat of S. fitzsimonsi is coastal dune forest, up to an altitude of 100 m (330 ft).

== Reproduction ==
S. fitzsimonsi is ovoviviparous.
