= Scelotes farquharsoni =

Scientific classification
- Kingdom: Animalia
- Phylum: Chordata
- Class: Reptilia
- Order: Squamata
- Family: Scincidae
- Genus: Scelotes
- Species: S. farquharsoni

Binomial name
- Scelotes farquharsoni Raw, 2020

Species of reptile

Scelotes farquharsoni is a species of lizard in the family Scincidae. The species is endemic to South Africa.

== Etymology ==
The specific name, farquharsoni, is in honor of Frank Lumsden Farquharson (1934–2019).

== Habitat ==
The preferred natural habitat of S. farquharsoni is grassland.
