= Günther's dwarf burrowing skink =

Conservation status
- Extinct (IUCN 3.1)

Scientific classification
- Kingdom: Animalia
- Phylum: Chordata
- Class: Reptilia
- Order: Squamata
- Family: Scincidae
- Genus: Scelotes
- Species: †S. guentheri

Binomial name
- †Scelotes guentheri Boulenger, 1887

Species of lizard

Günther's dwarf burrowing skink (Scelotes guentheri), also known commonly as Günther's burrowing skink, was a species of lizard in the family Scincidae. The species was endemic to Natal, South Africa.

== Description ==
S. guentheri is known from only one specimen which was collected in 1886. It has greatly reduced limbs. The forelimbs are entirely absent, and the hind limbs retain only two digits. This holotype has a snout-to-vent length (SVL) of 9.8 cm (3.9 in), and a tail length of 7.0 cm (2.8 in).

== Etymology ==
The specific name, guentheri, and the common names are in honor of German-born British herpetologist Albert Günther.

== Conservation status ==
S. guentheri is considered to be extinct.
