= Scelotes duttoni =

Conservation status
- Least Concern (IUCN 3.1)

Scientific classification
- Kingdom: Animalia
- Phylum: Chordata
- Class: Reptilia
- Order: Squamata
- Family: Scincidae
- Genus: Scelotes
- Species: S. duttoni

Binomial name
- Scelotes duttoni Broadley, 1990

Species of reptile

Scelotes duttoni is a species of lizard in the family Scincidae. The species is endemic to the Bazaruto Archipelago in Mozambique.

== Etymology ==
The specific name, duttoni, is in honor of South African ecologist Paul Dutton.

== Habitat ==
The preferred natural habitat of S. duttoni is the supralittoral zone and dunes, at altitudes of 1–25 m (3.3–82.0 ft).

== Description ==
S. duttoni has no front legs, only vestigial buds. Each back leg has only two digits, the inner digit much longer than the outer. Adults have a snout-to-vent length (SVL) of 5–6 cm (2.0–2.4 in). The tail length is slightly shorter than (SVL). Dorsally, S. duttoni is blackish, with a pale dorsolateral line on each side.

== Reproduction ==
S. duttoni is ovoviviparous. Litter size is two or three young. Each newborn measures 4.5–5.0 cm (1.8–2.0 in) in total length (including tail).
