= Scelotes arenicola =

Conservation status
- Least Concern (IUCN 3.1)

Scientific classification
- Domain: Eukaryota
- Kingdom: Animalia
- Phylum: Chordata
- Class: Reptilia
- Order: Squamata
- Family: Scincidae
- Genus: Scelotes
- Species: S. arenicola

Binomial name
- Scelotes arenicola (Peters, 1854)

Species of reptile

Scelotes arenicola, the Zululand dwarf burrowing skink, is a species of lizard which is found in South Africa, Mozambique, and Eswatini. Note: the correct species name is arenicola, a noun in apposition, meaning a sand dweller, and does not change according to the gender of the genus name
