= Kasner's dwarf burrowing skink =

Conservation status
- Endangered (IUCN 3.1)

Scientific classification
- Kingdom: Animalia
- Phylum: Chordata
- Class: Reptilia
- Order: Squamata
- Family: Scincidae
- Genus: Scelotes
- Species: S. kasneri

Binomial name
- Scelotes kasneri V. FitzSimons, 1939

Species of lizard

Kasner's dwarf burrowing skink (Scelotes kasneri), also known commonly as Kasner's burrowing skink, is a species of lizard in the family Scincidae. The species endemic to South Africa.

== Geographic range ==
S. kasneri is indigenous to the Western Cape coast of South Africa.

== Habitat ==
The preferred natural habitat of S. kasneri is dunes and sandy soil, at elevations from sea level to 300 m (980 ft).

== Description ==
The limbs of S. kasneri are greatly reduced. The forelimbs are entirely lost, and each hind limb retains only two digits.

== Behavior ==
S. kasneri is terrestrial and fossorial.

== Reproduction ==
S. kasneri is ovoviviparous.

== Etymology ==
The specific name, kasneri, as well as the common names, are in honor of J.H. Kasner, collector of the type specimen.
