= Scelotes caffer =

Conservation status
- Least Concern (IUCN 3.1)

Scientific classification
- Kingdom: Animalia
- Phylum: Chordata
- Class: Reptilia
- Order: Squamata
- Suborder: Scinciformata
- Infraorder: Scincomorpha
- Family: Scincidae
- Genus: Scelotes
- Species: S. caffer

Binomial name
- Scelotes caffer (Peters, 1861)

Species of reptile

Scelotes caffer, the Cape dwarf burrowing skink or Peters's burrowing skink, is a species of lizard which is endemic to South Africa.
