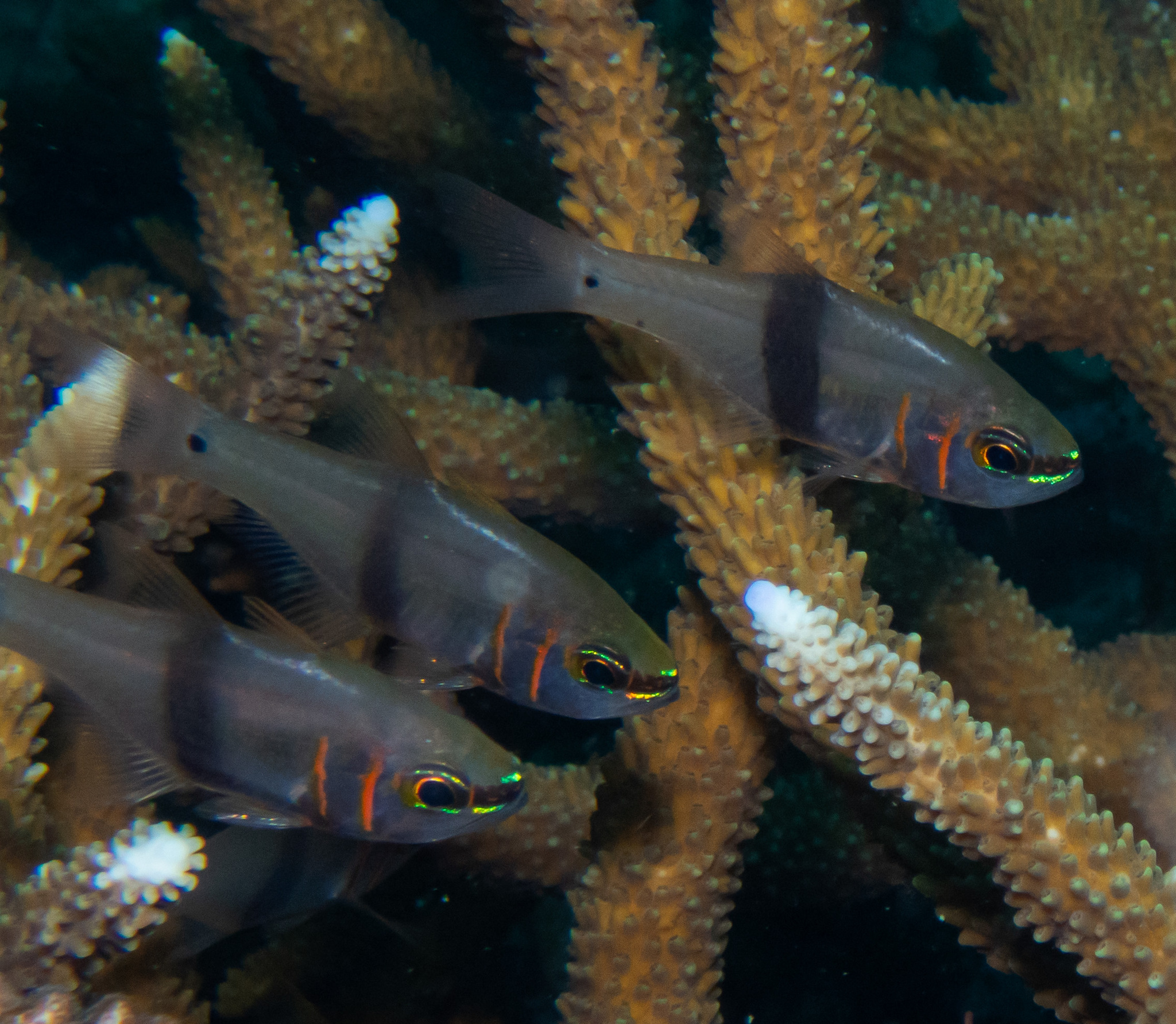
- Taeniamia zosterophora

Scientific classification
- Kingdom: Animalia
- Phylum: Chordata
- Class: Actinopterygii
- Order: Gobiiformes
- Family: Apogonidae
- Subfamily: Apogoninae
- Genus: Taeniamia; T. H. Fraser, 2013

Type species
- Archamia leai Waite, 1916

= Taeniamia =

Genus of fishes

Taeniamia is a genus of cardinalfishes native to the Indian Ocean and the western Pacific Ocean.

== Species ==
The 16 recognized species in this genus are:

- Taeniamia ataenia (J. E. Randall & Satapoomin, 1999) (barless cardinalfish)
- Taeniamia biguttata (Lachner, 1951) (twinspot cardinalfish)
- Taeniamia bilineata (Gon & J. E. Randall, 1995)
- Taeniamia buruensis (Bleeker, 1856) (Buru cardinalfish)
- Taeniamia dispilus (Lachner, 1951)
- Taeniamia flavofasciata (Gon & J. E. Randall, 2003)
- Taeniamia fucata (Cantor, 1849) (orange-lined cardinalfish)
- Taeniamia kagoshimana (Döderlein (de), 1883)
- Taeniamia leai (Waite, 1916) (Lea's cardinalfish)
- Taeniamia lineolata (G. Cuvier, 1828) (shimmering cardinal)
- Taeniamia macroptera (G. Cuvier, 1828) (dusky-tailed cardinalfish)
- Taeniamia melasma (Lachner & W. R. Taylor, 1960) (blackspot cardinalfish)
- Taeniamia mozambiquensis (J. L. B. Smith, 1961) (Mozambique cardinalfish)
- Taeniamia pallida (Gon & J. E. Randall, 1995)
- Taeniamia sansibarica (Pfeffer, 1896)
- Taeniamia zosterophora (Bleeker, 1856) (girdled cardinalfish or blackbelted cardinalfish)

FishBase treats T. sansibarica as synonymous with T. fucata. but T. sansibarica is recognized as valid by the Catalog of Fishes:
