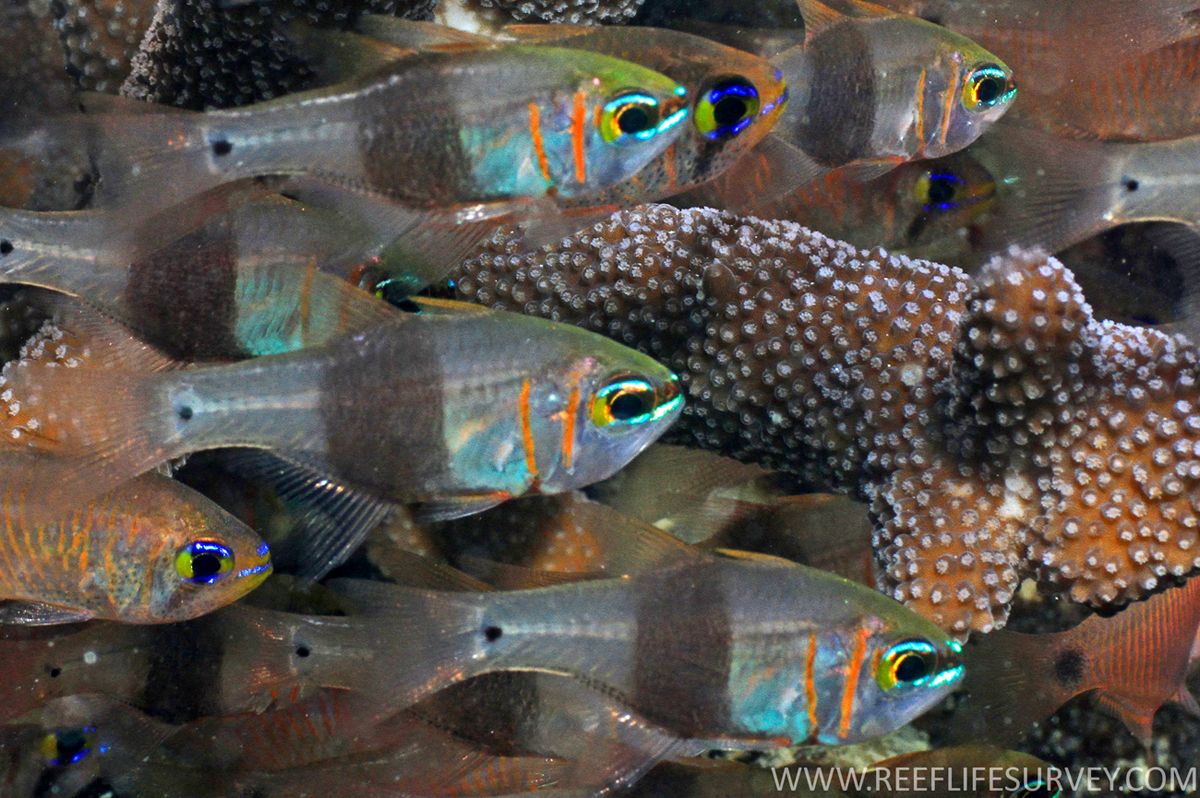

Conservation status
- Least Concern (IUCN 3.1)

Scientific classification
- Kingdom: Animalia
- Phylum: Chordata
- Class: Actinopterygii
- Division: Teleostei
- Order: Gobiiformes
- Family: Apogonidae
- Genus: Taeniamia
- Species: T. zosterophora

Binomial name
- Taeniamia zosterophora Bleeker, 1856

Synonyms
- Apogon zosterophorus Bleeker 1856; Archamia zosterophora (Bleeker 1856)

= Taeniamia zosterophora =

Species of fish

Taeniamia zosterophora, the girdled cardinalfish or blackbelted cardinalfish, is a species of marine ray-finned fish belonging to the family Apogonidae, the cardinalfishes. This cardinalfish is found in the western Pacific Oceans.

== Taxonomy ==
Taeniamia zosterophora was first formally described as Apogon zosterophorus in 1856 by the Dutch physician, herpetologist and ichthyologist Pieter Bleeker with its type locality given as Manado, Sulawesi, Indonesia. This species is now classified in the genus Taeniamia, which was described in 2013 by Thomas Henry Fraser with Archamia leai designated as its type species. The genus Taeniamia along with Archamia, is placed in the tribe Archamiini within the subfamily Apogoninae. The family Apogonidae is in the suborder Apogonoidei in the order Gobiiformes.

== Etymology ==
Taeniamia zosterophora is classified in the genus Taeniamia, which combines taenia, derived from tainía, meaning "band" or "ribbon", with Amia. The first is a reference to the vertically wide bars and near-vertical to curved slender bars creating lines on most of the members of this genus. Amia, in this case, is a non binomial name originally coined by Laurens Theodorus Gronovius for the genus Apogon which is now used as a common suffix for genus names within the cardinalfish family. The specific name, zosterophora, combines zosteros is a genitive singular of zoster, meaning "belt" or "girdle", with phora, which means to "bear" or "carry", an allusion to the black band which goes around the body of this fish.

== Description ==
Taeniamia zosterophora has a short and deep body with a compressed cross section. It reaches a maximum total length of 8 cm (3.1 in), although a standard length of 6.1 cm (2.4 in) is more typical. The first dorsal fin contains 6 spines, the second dorsal fin has a single spine and 9 soft rays while the anal fin has 2 spines and between 14 and 16 soft rays. This species is nearly transparent with a light pinkish to greyish overall colour with a wide black, vertical band encircling the body below the first dorsal fin and 2 iridescent blue lines running from the top and bottom of the eyes onto the snout.

== Distribution and habitat ==
Taeniamia zosterophora occurs in the western Pacific Ocean from the Gulf of Thailand through the Malay Archipelago as far east as Fiji, north to the Ryukyu Islands of southern Japan and south to northern Australia and New Caledonia. In Australia it is found around the offshore reefs of northern Western Australia, the Ashmore Reef in the Timor Sea and on the Great Barrier Reef. The girdled cardinalfish aggregates in dense schools in or over the branches of Porites cylindrica and other similar branching corals, e.g. Acropora, in sheltered lagoons and inshore bays, over sandy bottom at depths of 1 to 40 m (3 ft 3 in to 131 ft 3 in).

== Behaviour ==
Taeniamia zosterophora is nocturnal. They are mouthbrooders and the males and females form pairs during courtship and spawning.
