= Scelotes insularis =

Conservation status
- Least Concern (IUCN 3.1)

Scientific classification
- Kingdom: Animalia
- Phylum: Chordata
- Class: Reptilia
- Order: Squamata
- Suborder: Scinciformata
- Infraorder: Scincomorpha
- Family: Scincidae
- Genus: Scelotes
- Species: S. insularis

Binomial name
- Scelotes insularis Broadley, 1990

Species of reptile

Scelotes insularis is a species of lizard which is endemic to Mozambique.
