= Scelotes uluguruensis =

Scientific classification
- Domain: Eukaryota
- Kingdom: Animalia
- Phylum: Chordata
- Class: Reptilia
- Order: Squamata
- Family: Scincidae
- Genus: Scelotes
- Species: S. uluguruensis

Binomial name
- Scelotes uluguruensis Barbour & Loveridge, 1928

Species of reptile

Scelotes uluguruensis, the Uluguru fossorial skink, is a species of lizard which is endemic to Tanzania.
