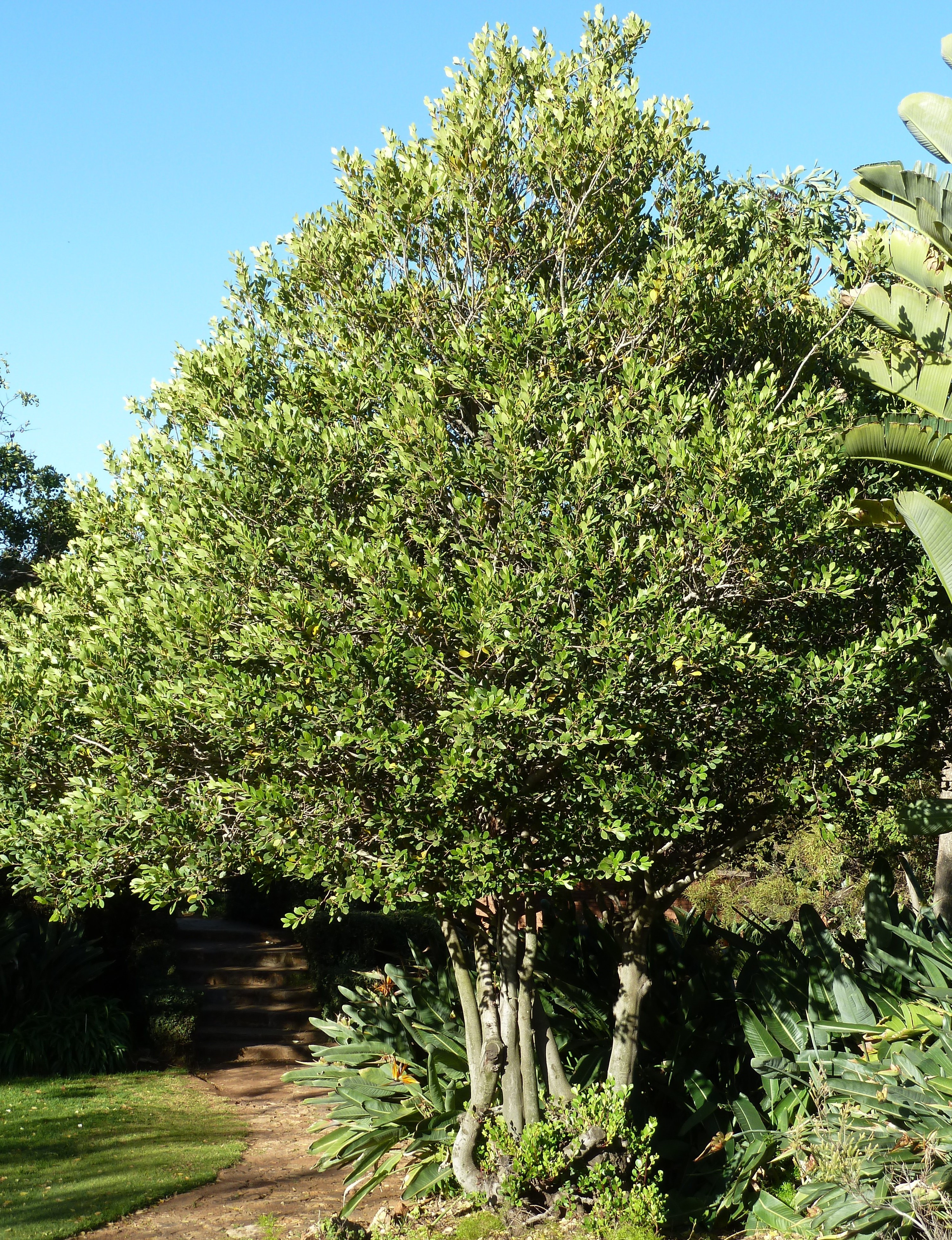
- Pterocelastrus tricuspidatus

Scientific classification
- Kingdom: Plantae
- Clade: Tracheophytes
- Clade: Angiosperms
- Clade: Eudicots
- Clade: Rosids
- Order: Celastrales
- Family: Celastraceae
- Genus: Pterocelastrus; Meisn. (1837)

Species
- 4; see text

Synonyms
- Asterocarpus Eckl. & Zeyh. (1835)

= Pterocelastrus =

Genus of flowering plants

Pterocelastrus is a genus of flowering plants in the family Celastraceae. It includes four species native to southeastern and southern Africa, ranging from Malawi and Mozambique to Zimbabwe and South Africa.

== Species ==
- Pterocelastrus dregeanus (C.Presl) Sond.
- Pterocelastrus echinatus N.E.Br.
- Pterocelastrus rostratus (Thunb.) Walp.
- Pterocelastrus tricuspidatus (Lam.) Walp.
