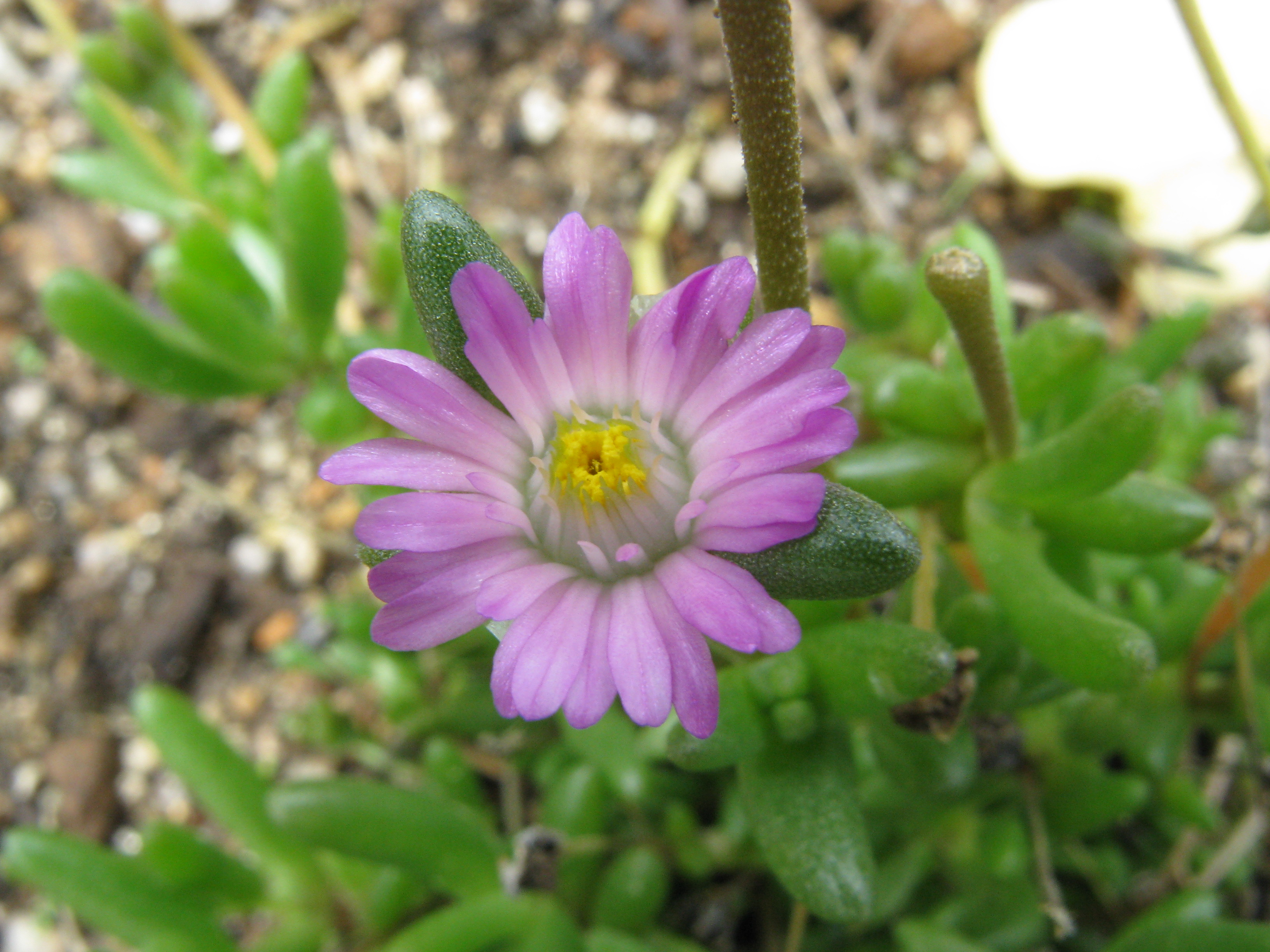

Scientific classification
- Kingdom: Plantae
- Clade: Tracheophytes
- Clade: Angiosperms
- Clade: Eudicots
- Order: Caryophyllales
- Family: Aizoaceae
- Genus: Lampranthus
- Species: L. tenuifolius

Binomial name
- Lampranthus tenuifolius (L.) N.E.Br.

Synonyms
- Mesembryanthemum tenuifolium L.; Mesembryanthus tenuifolius (L.) Rothm., not validly publ.

= Lampranthus tenuifolius =

Species of succulent

Lampranthus tenuifolius, the narrow-leaf brightfig, is a critically endangered species of succulent plant that is endemic to the Cape Flats Dune Strandveld around Cape Town, South Africa.

== Description ==
This tiny species of brightfig is normally not more than 10–15 cm in height. It produces bright pink and violet flowers.

== Distribution ==
This plant is naturally restricted to the coastal dune Strandveld vegetation of the Cape Flats, Cape Town. Here it grows in mildly alkaline or neutral sands.

== Threats and conservation ==
In the last few decades, Lampranthus tenuifolius has lost most of its natural habitat and over 80% of its subpopulations, to farming and the urban sprawl of Cape Town.

Two tiny and fragmented patches of this plant remain, totalling roughly 100 plants. This tiny population is still decreasing - now mainly due to invasive alien plants and coastal developments.
