= Scelotes poensis =

Scientific classification
- Domain: Eukaryota
- Kingdom: Animalia
- Phylum: Chordata
- Class: Reptilia
- Order: Squamata
- Family: Scincidae
- Genus: Scelotes
- Species: S. poensis

Binomial name
- Scelotes poensis Bocage, 1895

Species of reptile

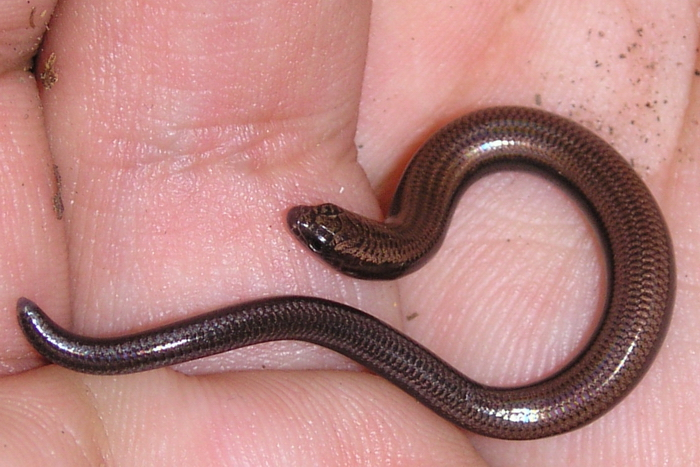
Another skink belonging to the Scelotes genus

Scelotes poensis is a species of small skink endemic to the coastal forests of Bioko, such as the regions surrounding Malabo. The species has also potentially been sighted in the coastal forests of Cameroon. It is also known as the Fernando Po Burrowing Skink, after the historic name for Bioko.

No physical examples nor images of the species exist. Furthermore, despite this name, it is debated whether the animal is terrestrial or fossorial. It is, however, know that the average adult of the species weighs 9.77g and that the species lacks both forelimbs and hindlimbs.
