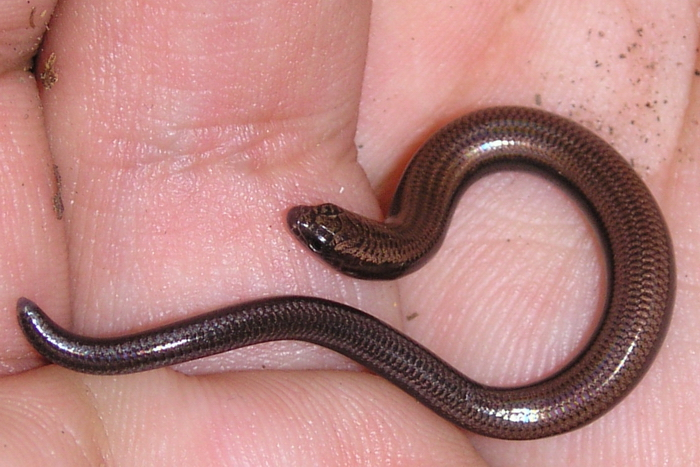

Conservation status
- Least Concern (IUCN 3.1)

Scientific classification
- Kingdom: Animalia
- Phylum: Chordata
- Class: Reptilia
- Order: Squamata
- Suborder: Scinciformata
- Infraorder: Scincomorpha
- Family: Scincidae
- Genus: Scelotes
- Species: S. mossambicus

Binomial name
- Scelotes mossambicus (Peters, 1882)

= Scelotes mossambicus =

Species of reptile

Scelotes mossambicus, the Mozambique dwarf burrowing skink, is a species of lizard which is found in South Africa, Mozambique, and Eswatini.
