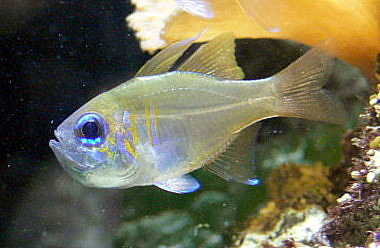
- Zoramia leptacantha

Scientific classification
- Kingdom: Animalia
- Phylum: Chordata
- Class: Actinopterygii
- Order: Gobiiformes
- Family: Apogonidae
- Subfamily: Apogoninae
- Genus: Zoramia; D. S. Jordan, 1917

Type species
- Apogon graeffii a synonym of Zoramia leptacantha Günther, 1873

= Zoramia =

Genus of fishes

Zoramia is a genus of cardinalfishes native to the Indian and Pacific Oceans. Members of this genus are typically distinguished by their translucent bodies and large, prominent eyes, and they are commonly found sheltering among the branches of reef-building corals during the day.

== Species ==
The recognized species in this genus are:

- Zoramia flebila D. W. Greenfield, Langston & J. E. Randall, 2005
- Zoramia fragilis (J. L. B. Smith, 1961) (fragile cardinalfish)
- Zoramia gilberti (D. S. Jordan & Seale, 1905) (Gilbert's cardinalfish)
- Zoramia leptacantha (Bleeker, 1856) (threadfin cardinalfish)
- Zoramia perlita (T. H. Fraser & Lachner, 1985) (pearly cardinalfish)
- Zoramia viridiventer D. W. Greenfield, Langston & J. E. Randall, 2005
