= Scelotes inornatus =

Conservation status
- Critically Endangered (IUCN 3.1)

Scientific classification
- Kingdom: Animalia
- Phylum: Chordata
- Class: Reptilia
- Order: Squamata
- Suborder: Scinciformata
- Infraorder: Scincomorpha
- Family: Scincidae
- Genus: Scelotes
- Species: S. inornatus

Binomial name
- Scelotes inornatus (Smith, 1849)
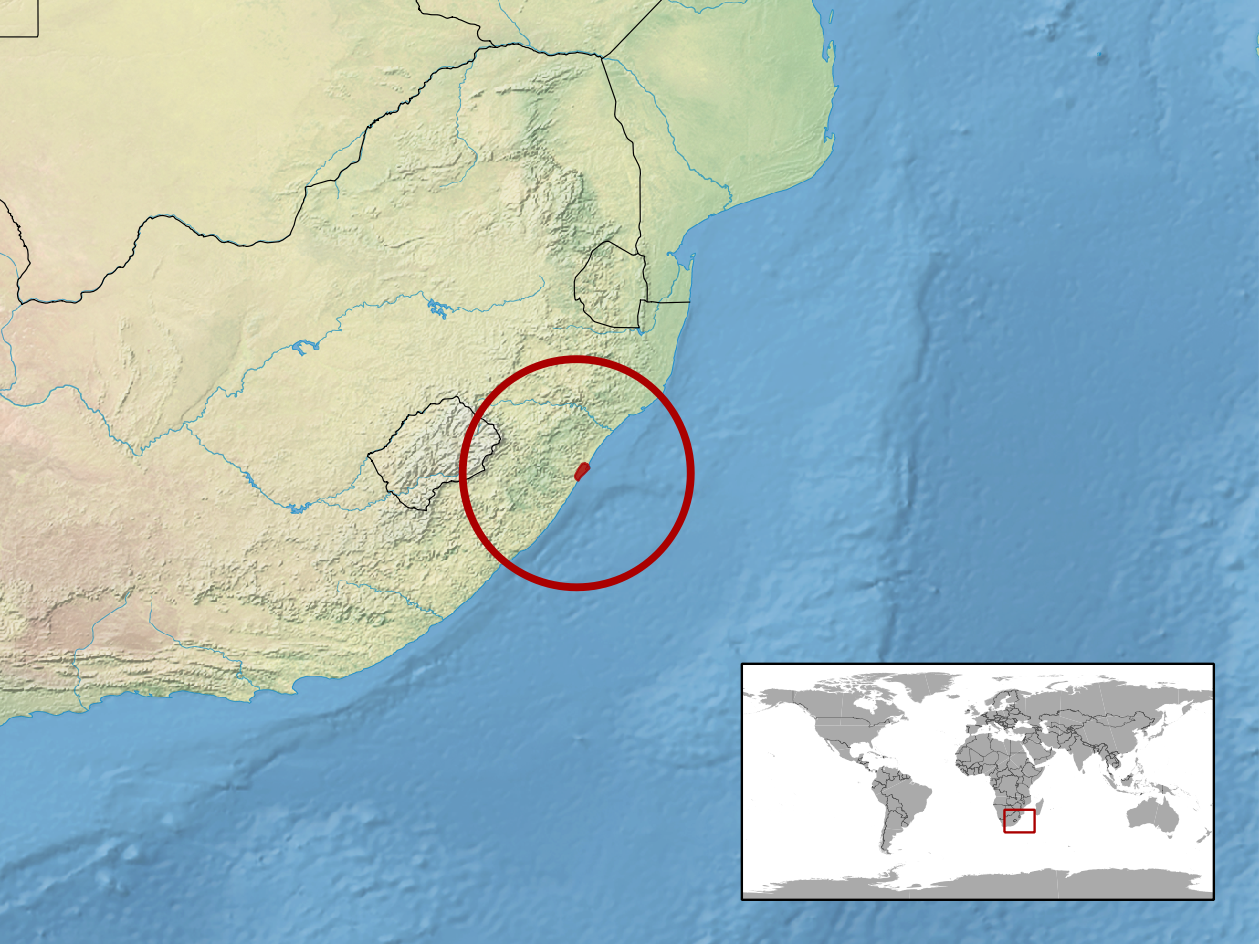

Species of reptile

Scelotes inornatus, the Durban dwarf burrowing skink or legless burrowing skink, is a species of lizard which is found in South Africa and Mozambique.
