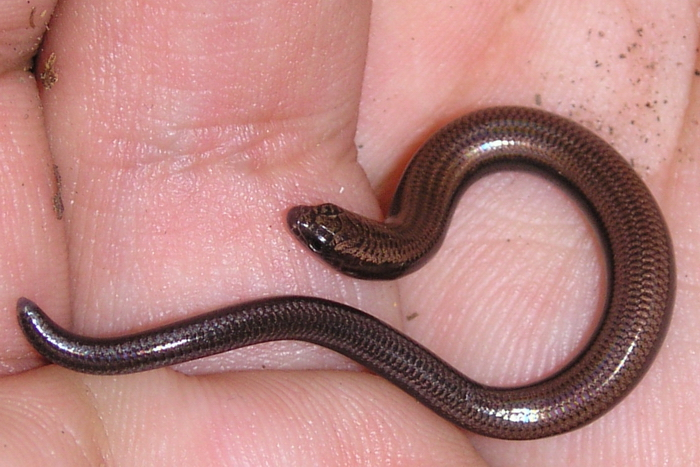
- Scelotes mossambicus

Scientific classification
- Kingdom: Animalia
- Phylum: Chordata
- Class: Reptilia
- Order: Squamata
- Family: Scincidae
- Subfamily: Scincinae
- Genus: Scelotes; Fitzinger, 1826

= Scelotes =

Genus of lizards

Scelotes is a genus of small African skinks.

== Species ==
The following 21 species are recognized as being valid.

- Scelotes anguinus (Boulenger, 1887) – Algoa dwarf burrowing skink, Boulenger's burrowing skink,
- Scelotes arenicola (W. Peters, 1854) – Zululand dwarf burrowing skink
- Scelotes bidigittatus V. FitzSimons, 1930 – Lowveld dwarf burrowing skink
- Scelotes bipes (Linnaeus, 1766) – silvery dwarf burrowing skink, common burrowing skink
- Scelotes caffer (W. Peters, 1861) – Cape dwarf burrowing skink, Peters's burrowing skink
- Scelotes capensis (A. Smith, 1849) – western dwarf burrowing skink, cape burrowing skink
- Scelotes duttoni Broadley, 1990
- Scelotes farquharsoni Raw, 2020
- Scelotes fitzsimonsi Broadley, 1994 – Fitzsimons's dwarf burrowing skink
- Scelotes gronovii (Daudin, 1802) – Gronovi's dwarf burrowing skink
- Scelotes guentheri Boulenger, 1887 – Günther's dwarf burrowing skink
- Scelotes inornatus (A. Smith, 1849) – Durban dwarf burrowing skink, legless burrowing skink
- Scelotes insularis Broadley, 1990
- Scelotes kasneri V. FitzSimons, 1939 – Kasner's dwarf burrowing skink
- Scelotes limpopoensis V. FitzSimons, 1930 – Limpopo burrowing skink
- Scelotes mirus (Roux, 1907) – montane dwarf burrowing skink
- Scelotes montispectus Bauer, Whiting & Sadlier, 2003 – Bloubergstrand dwarf burrowing skink
- Scelotes mossambicus (W. Peters, 1882) – Mozambique dwarf burrowing skink
- Scelotes poensis Bocage, 1895 – Fernando Po burrowing skink
- Scelotes sexlineatus (Harlan, 1824) – striped dwarf burrowing skink
- Scelotes uluguruensis Barbour & Loveridge, 1928 – Uluguru fossorial skink
- Scelotes vestigifer Broadley, 1994 – coastal dwarf burrowing skink

Nota bene: A binomial authority in parentheses indicates that the species was originally described in a genus other than Scelotes.
