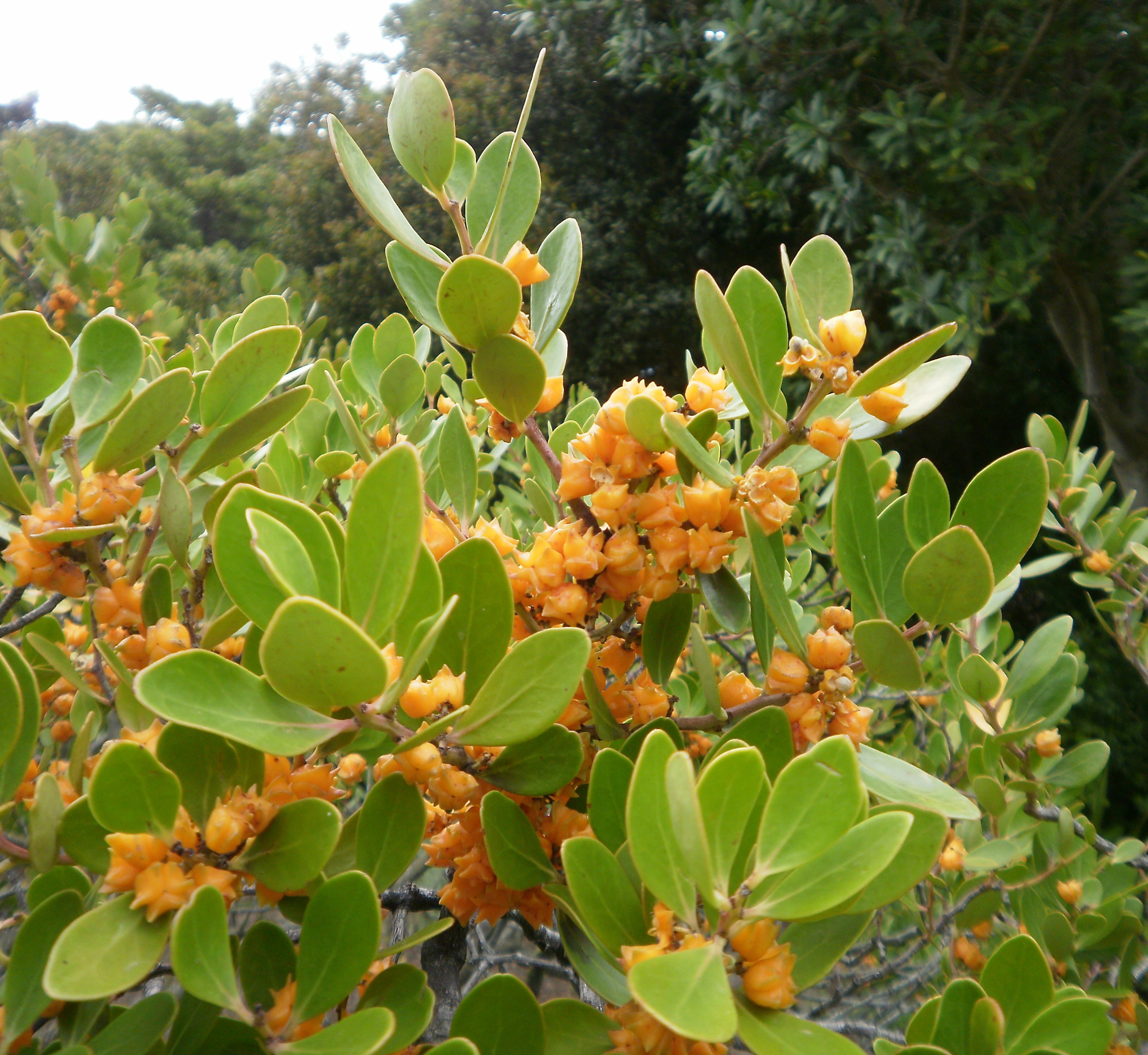

Scientific classification
- Kingdom: Plantae
- Clade: Tracheophytes
- Clade: Angiosperms
- Clade: Eudicots
- Clade: Rosids
- Order: Celastrales
- Family: Celastraceae
- Genus: Pterocelastrus
- Species: P. tricuspidatus

Binomial name
- Pterocelastrus tricuspidatus Loes.

= Pterocelastrus tricuspidatus =

Species of tree

Pterocelastrus tricuspidatus, commonly called candlewood, cherrywood or kershout, is a medium-sized evergreen tree, indigenous to South Africa.

== Distribution ==
The candlewood is indigenous to the southern part of South Africa. Here it naturally occurs from Cape Town in the west, all the way along the south coast of South Africa as far as KwaZulu-Natal. In this range it can be found in most soil types, from coastal sand to rocky mountain slopes and clay.

== Description ==
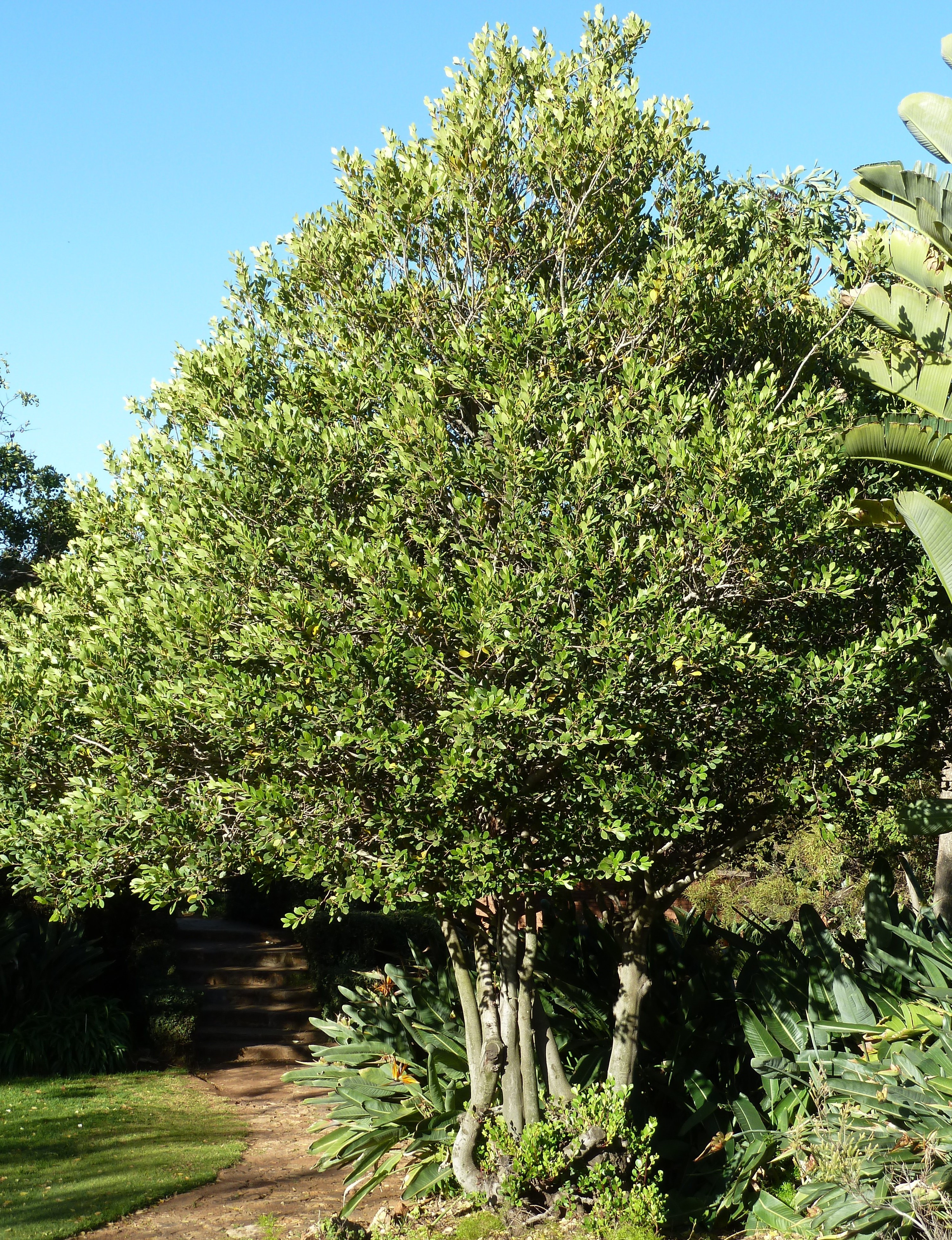
Candlewood tree in cultivation, Pretoria.

In the wild it often grows as a stunted bush (especially in exposed positions). However, if permitted to by favourable conditions, it can grow into a tree of up to 10 meters in height.

The masses of sweetly scented flowers are followed by large numbers of very distinctive and attractive bright-orange, lantern-shaped berries. The young leaves are red, but mature to a glossy green colour.

== Cultivation ==
In cultivation, the candlewood can be pruned to form a proper shade tree. However, it can also be allowed to grow as a bushy screen, if its lower branches are not removed. This plant grows particularly well in coastal conditions (although it can also be found inland).

Its primary reason for cultivation are as a coastal hedge, and for its ornamental bright orange, lantern-shaped berries, which attract birds.

The candlewood tree tolerates drought and severe frost once it is established.
