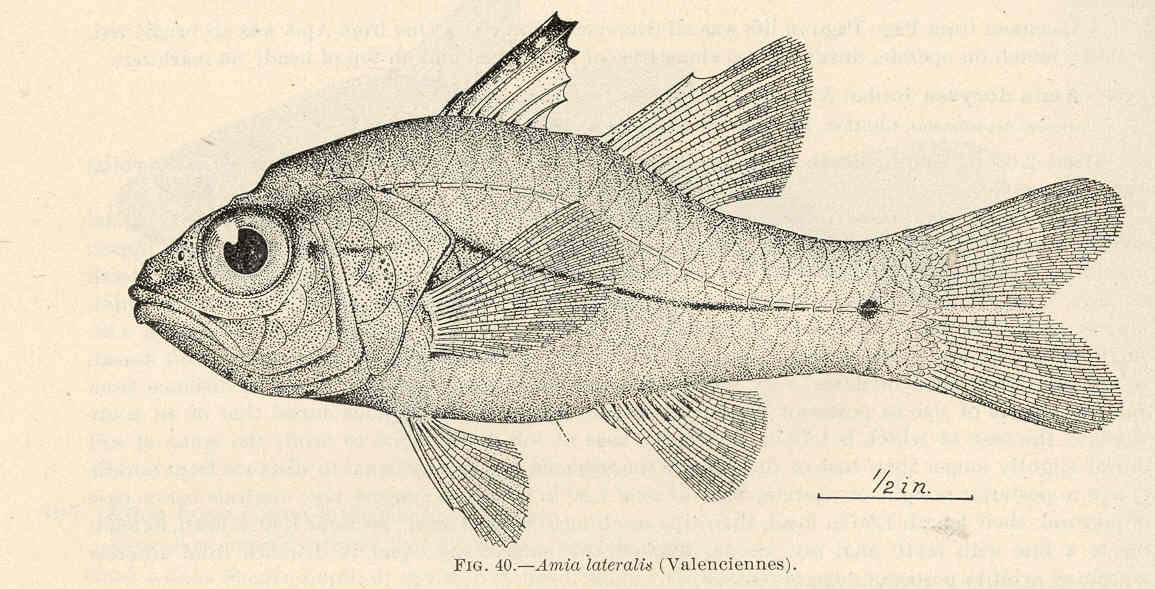
- Fibramia lateralis

Scientific classification
- Kingdom: Animalia
- Phylum: Chordata
- Class: Actinopterygii
- Division: Teleostei
- Order: Gobiiformes
- Family: Apogonidae
- Subfamily: Apogoninae
- Genus: Fibramia; T. H. Fraser & Mabuchi, 2014

Type species
- Fibramia thermalis Cuvier, 1829

= Fibramia =

Genus of fishes

Fibramia is a genus of fishes in the family Apogonidae from the Indian Ocean. The first fossil record of this genus is Fibramia keralensis (only otoliths found) from the Burdigalian (Miocene) of southwestern India.

== Species ==
The recognized species in this genus are:

- Fibramia amboinensis (Bleeker, 1853) (Amboina cardinalfish)
- Fibramia lateralis (Valenciennes, 1832) (humpback cardinalfish)
- Fibramia thermalis (G. Cuvier, 1829) (half-barred cardinalfish)
- †Fibramia keralensis Carolin, Bajpai, Maurya & Schwarzhans, 2022 (otolith-based fossil species)

†= extinct
