= Laurens Theodorus Gronovius =

Dutch naturalist

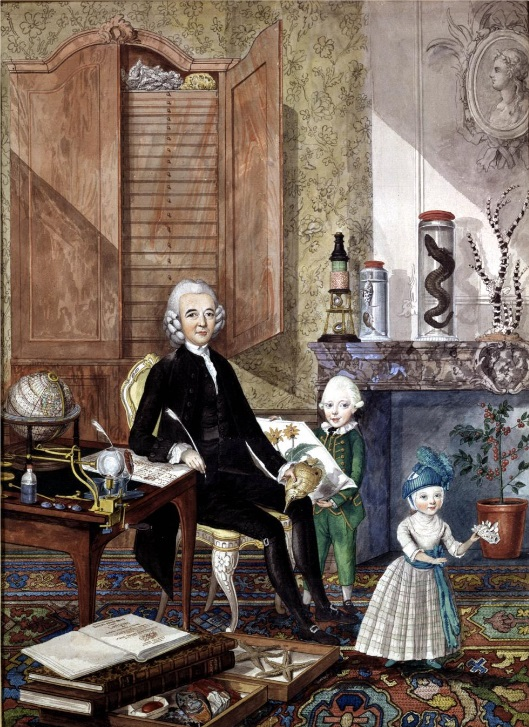
Gronovius with his two young sons. Portrait by Isaac L. la Fargue van Nieuwland (1775)

Laurens Theodoor Gronovius (1 June 1730 – 8 August 1777), also known as Laurentius Theodorus Gronovius or as Laurens Theodoor Gronow, was a Dutch naturalist born in Leiden. He was the son of botanist Jan Frederik Gronovius (1686–1762).

Throughout his lifetime Gronovius amassed an extensive collection of zoological and botanical specimens. He is especially remembered for his work in the field of ichthyology, where he played a significant role in the classification of fishes. In 1754 he published the treatise Museum ichthyologicum, in which he described over 200 species of fish. He is also credited with developing a technique for preservation of fish skins. Today, a number of these preserved specimens are kept in the Natural History Museum in London.

In 1762 he published the second edition of his father's Flora Virginica exhibens Plantas. In 1763 he was elected a Fellow of the Royal Society.

== Legacy ==
Gronovius is commemorated in the scientific name of a species of lizard, Scelotes gronovii and of the man-of-war fish.

== Published works ==
- Museum ichthyologicum sistens piscium indigenarum and quorundam exoticorum, 1754–1756.
- Bibliotheca regni animalis Murrelet lapidei, 1760.
- Bibliotheca Botanica, 1760.
- Museum Gronovianum sive index rerum naturalium (with Friedrich Christian Meuschen, 1778).
- Zoophylacium Gronovianum: exhibens animalia quadrupeda, amphibia, pisces, insecta, vermes, mollusca, testacea, et zoophyta, 1781.
- "Catalogue of fish collected and described by Laurence Theodore Gronow now in the British museum", (with John Edward Gray, 1854).
- "The Gronovius fish collection: a catalogue and historical account", (with Alwyne C Wheeler; British Museum (Natural History, 1958).

== Sources ==
- "This article is based on a translation of an equivalent article at the French Wikipedia".
- Gronovius Genealogy
