= Blushing bride =

Blushing bride may refer to:

- Our Blushing Brides, a 1930 film
- Serruria florida (blushing bride), a species of flowering plant native to South Africa
- Tillandsia ionantha (Blushing Bride), a species of flowering plant in genus Tillandsia, a member of the Bromeliad family (Bromeliaceae).
