= Ericoid =

Term for plants resembling or related to heather

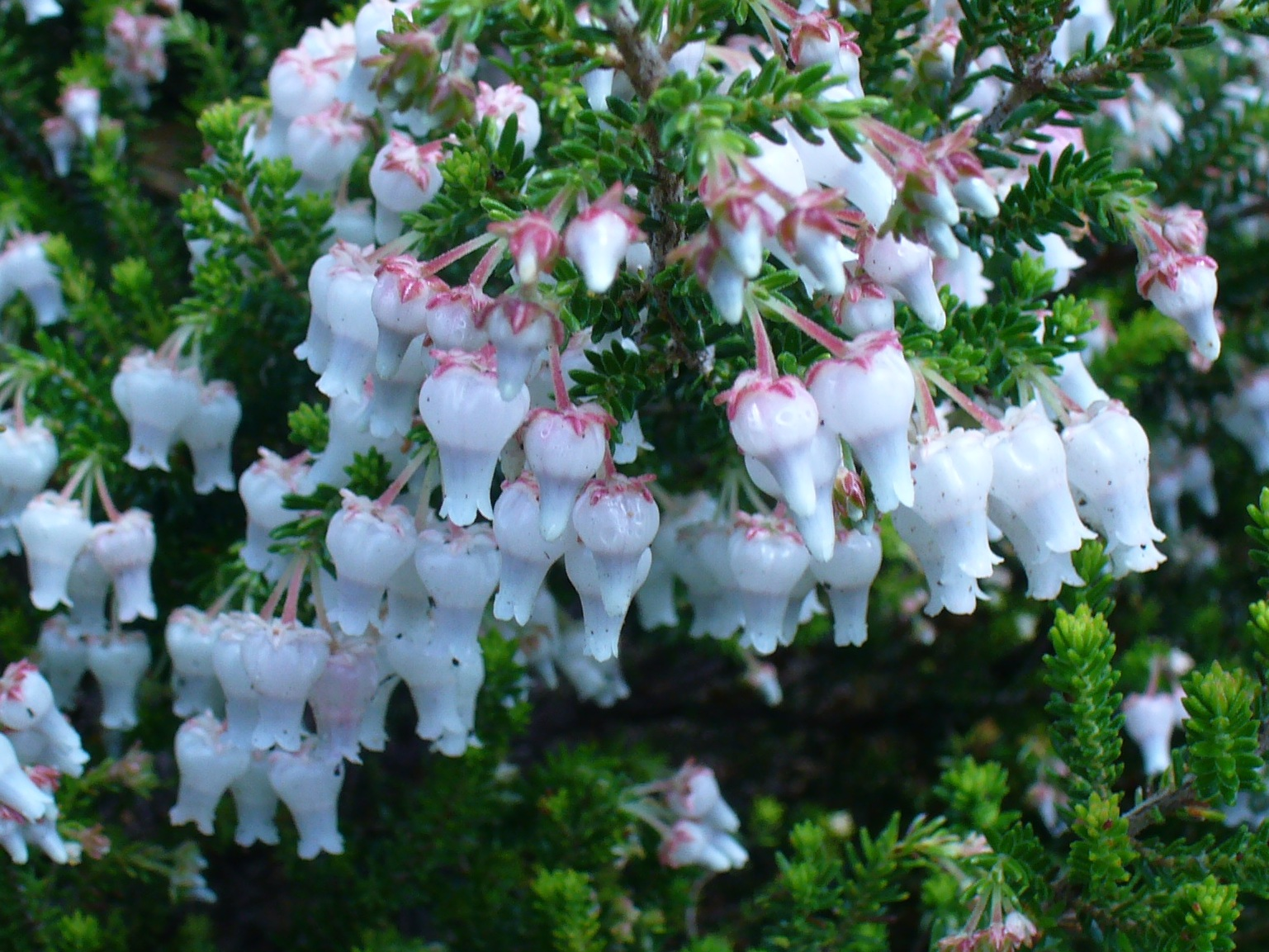
Erica glomiflora

Struthiola myrsinites in flower. Note ericoid habit.

The word "ericoid" is used in modern biological terminology for its literal meanings and for extensions. Ericoid could have more than one meaning, but in practice the most common use is in reference to a plant's habit, to describe small, tough (sclerophyllous) leaves like those of heather. Etymologically the word is derived from two Greek roots via Latin adaptations. First, the Ancient Greek name for plants now known in English as "heather" was "ἐρείκη", believed to be Latinised by Pliny as "Erica". Carl Linnaeus, who predominantly wrote in Latin, used Erica as the name of the genus which still is known as such.

Alternative meanings are a member of the subfamily Ericoideae (noun) or pertaining to that subfamily (adjective).

However, when Linnaeus named an organism, using a specific epithet that described it as being like some particular thing, he commonly did so by appending the suffix "—οειδης". That was a contraction of "—ο + ειδος", denoting a likeness of form. In its Latinised form it became: "—oides". An example is the entry 9413 Stilbe ericoides according to Wappler's Index Plantarum to Linnaeus's "Species Plantarum". Further derivations emerged at need or convenience, such as "—oidea".

Accordingly, ericoid could have more than one meaning and it has been misapplied from time to time in the literature. For example, sometimes a writer uses it where the correct word would be "ericaceous", meaning a member of, or related to, the family Ericaceae. More precisely ericoid means "resembling an Erica" in some relevant way. Applied to a plant, ericoid generally means that apart from its sclerophyllous leaves, it has short internodes so that the leaves more or less cover the usually slender branchlet.
