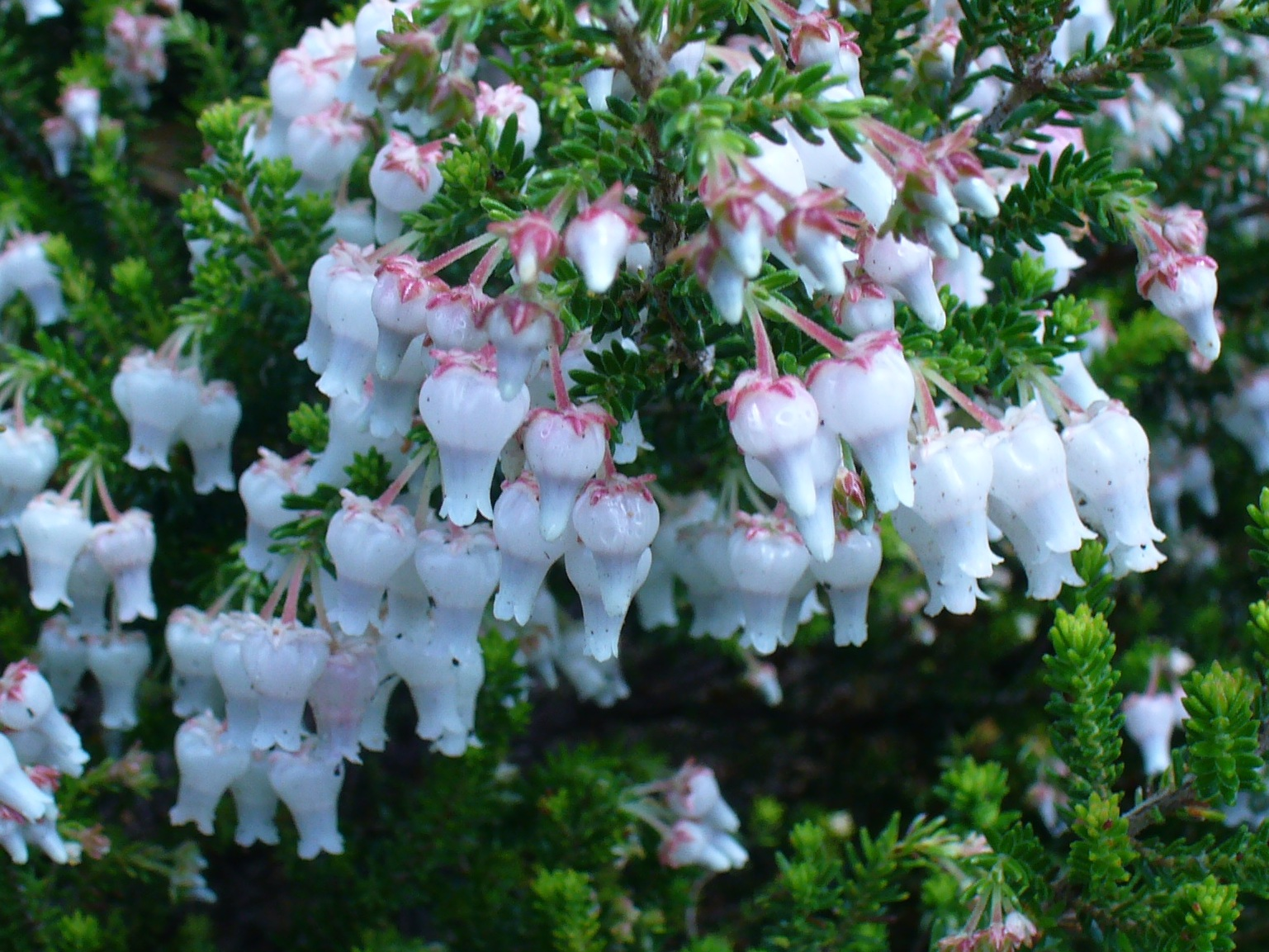

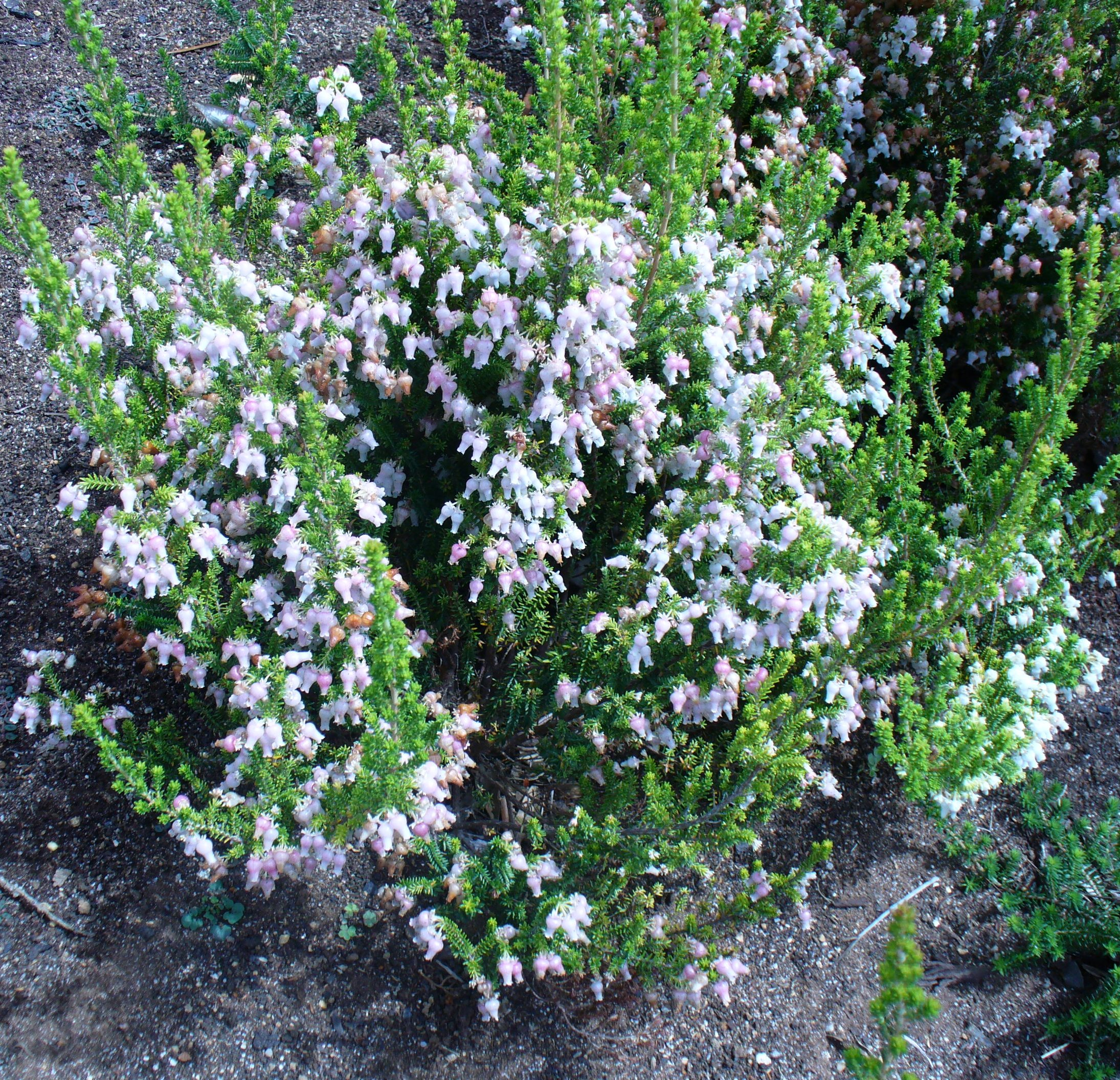

Scientific classification
- Kingdom: Plantae
- Clade: Tracheophytes
- Clade: Angiosperms
- Clade: Eudicots
- Clade: Asterids
- Order: Ericales
- Family: Ericaceae
- Genus: Erica
- Species: E. glomiflora

Binomial name
- Erica glomiflora Salisb., (1802)

Synonyms
- Erica vesicaria Sol. ex Salisb.; Pachysa glomiflora G.Don

= Erica glomiflora =

Species of flowering plant

Erica glomiflora, the lantern heath, is a plant belonging to the genus Erica and forming part of the fynbos. The species' scientific name was first published by Richard Anthony Salisbury. The species is endemic to the Western Cape and occurs along the Garden Route.
