= Lourensford Alluvium Fynbos =

Vegetation type that is endemic to Cape Town, South Africa

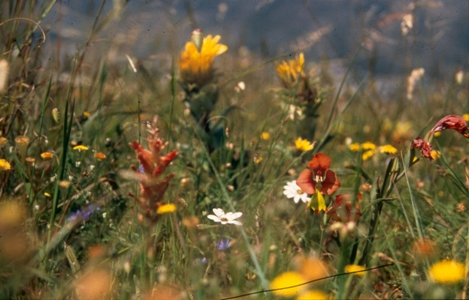
Lourensford Alluvium Fynbos growing at Harmony Flats Nature Reserve in Cape Town.

Lourensford Alluvium Fynbos is a critically endangered vegetation type that is endemic to Cape Town. Though closest to Fynbos, it has characteristics of both Fynbos and Renosterveld vegetation and is thus actually a unique hybrid vegetation type.

== Distribution ==
This ecosystem occurs only in what is now the eastern corner of the city - in and around the suburbs of Somerset West and Strand. It is located at the juncture between the mountain ranges in the east and the Cape Flats lowlands, and has a unique geology influenced by the underground flow of water from the mountains and the presence of a special kind of silt soil.

Restio and Asteraceous (daisy) species are most common, with Proteas and Ericas being relatively rarer. There are spots which are home to an unusually enormous variety and density of bulbs. Taller shrubs proliferate along the banks of streams.

== Conservation ==
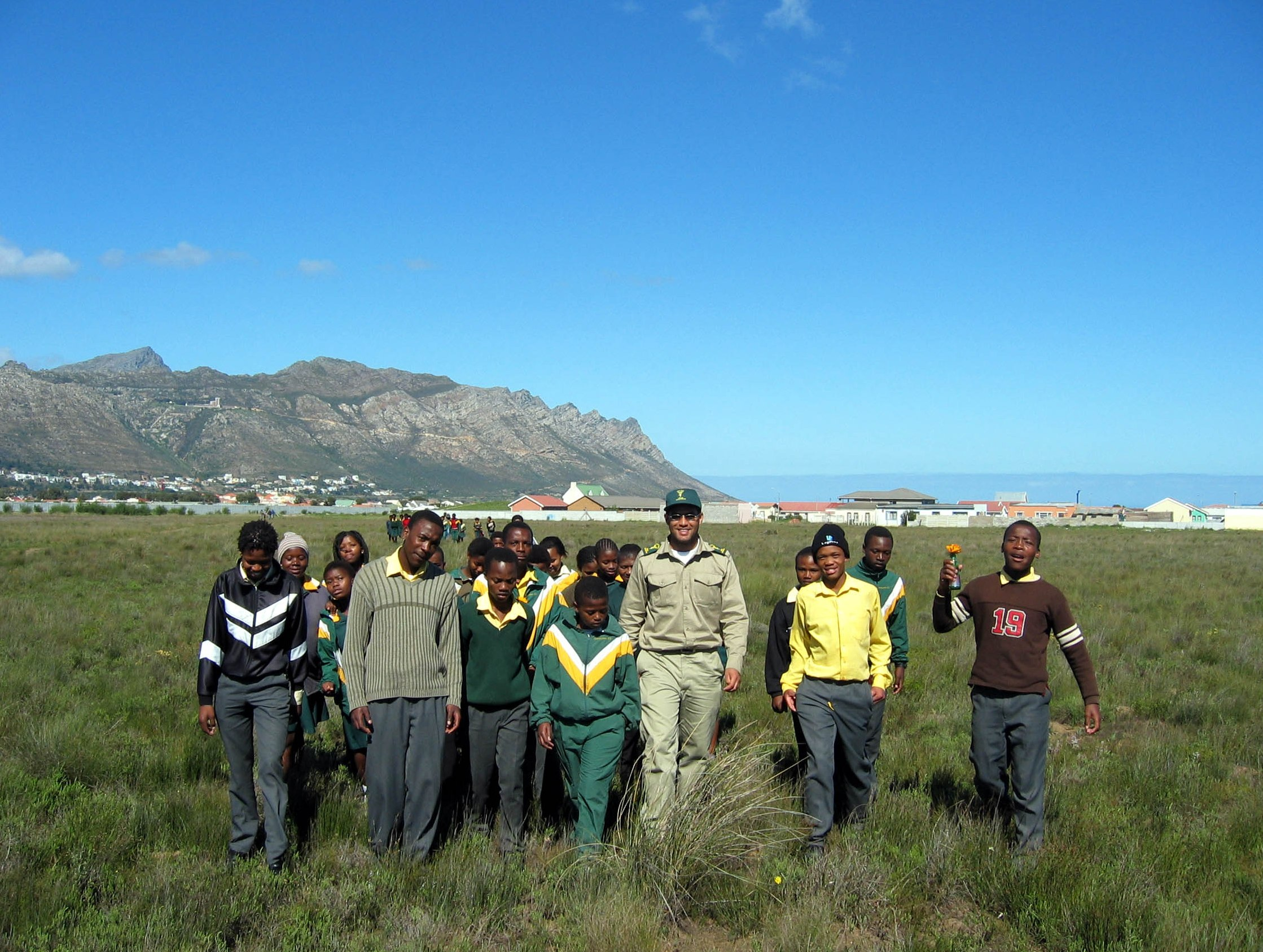
Harmony Flats Nature Reserve is now managed by local volunteers and community organisers

This was one of the earliest of the Cape's vegetation types to be largely destroyed, as the Lourensford area was transformed for farming as early as the 1600s. Large farms such as Vergelegen were built on top of this delicate vegetation and as the first botanical surveys were only carried out many years later, there is no record of what has been lost. Commercial Pine plantations were planted over much of the remaining area and now only small pockets of this critically endangered ecosystem remain. Altogether, less than 5% still survives and less than 1% is conserved. This is unsustainable and well below the national conservation target of 30%. The tiny Harmony Flats reserve conserves a patch of this vegetation but even this is too small to be ecologically viable. Now the main threats come from domestic cats and dogs, dumping of garden refuse, sand theft and invasive alien plants such as wattles and Kikuyu grass.

=== Fauna ===
The endangered Geometric tortoise is largely confined to Alluvium Fynbos.

The Geometric tortoise used to be found primarily in Alluvium Fynbos. Now, with its habitat largely destroyed, it is also critically endangered. Harmony Flats Nature Reserve, which conserves Alluvium Fynbos, lost its last population of these tortoises which became extinct here in the 1980s.

== See also ==
- Biodiversity of Cape Town
- Harmony Flats Nature Reserve
- Swartland Alluvium Fynbos
- Cape Floristic Region
- Index: Fynbos - habitats and species.
