= Swartland Alluvium Fynbos =

Vegetation type endemic to South Africa

Swartland Alluvium Fynbos is a critically endangered vegetation type that occurs on the high plains and mountains in the far south-west of the Western Cape, South Africa.

Only 6% of this type of fynbos remains and it has been declared critically endangered. It can still be found in the Western Cape, between the towns of Stellenbosch and Porterville, with a tiny portion extending into the city of Cape Town.

== See also ==
- Biodiversity of Cape Town
- Cape Floristic Region
- Lourensford Alluvium Fynbos
- Category:Fynbos - habitats and species.
