= Cape Floristic Region =

Smallest of the six recognised floral kingdoms of the world

Cape Floral Region Protected Areas
UNESCO World Heritage Site
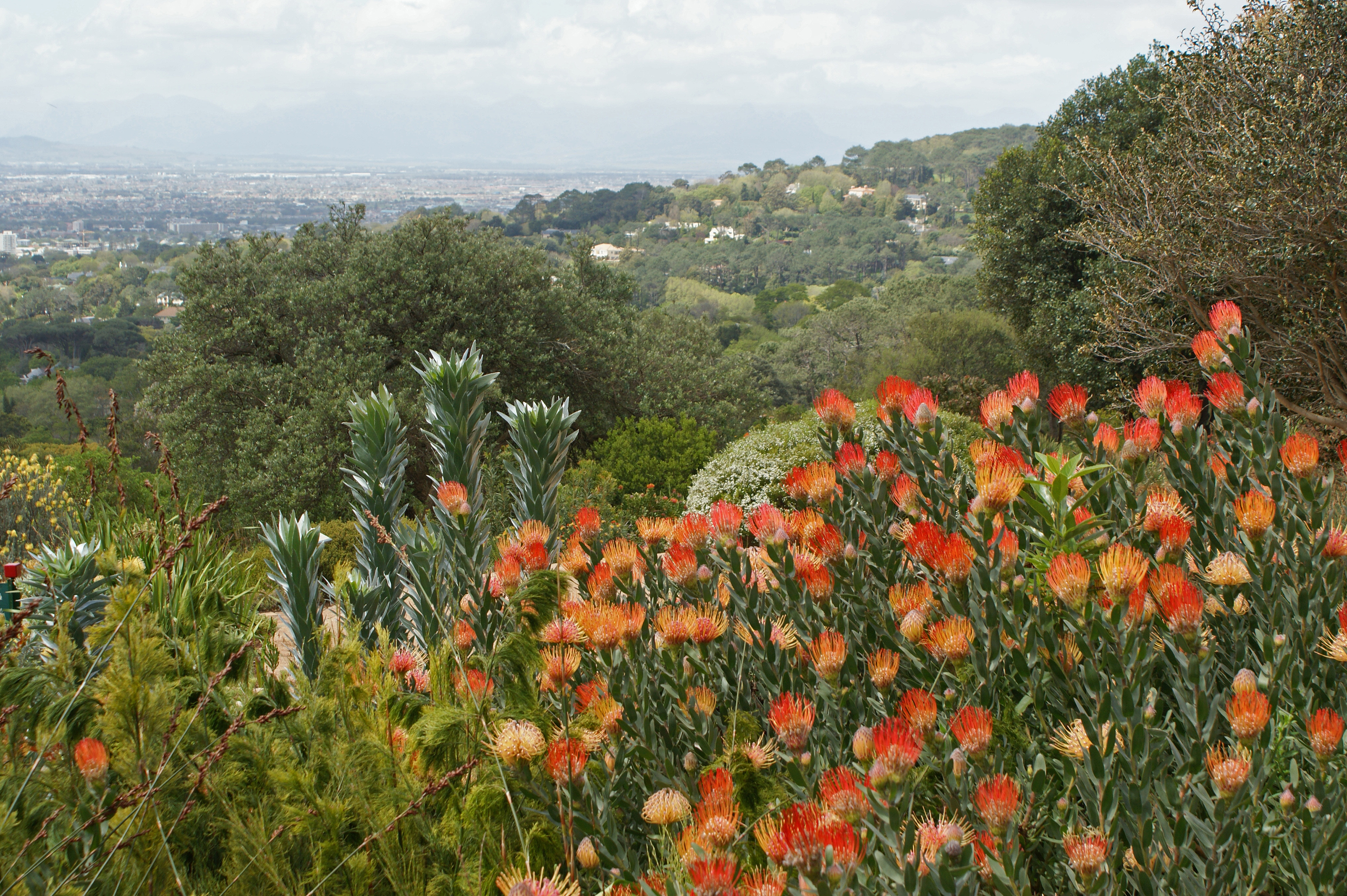

- Location within South Africa
- Location: South Africa
- Includes: Table Mountain National Park; Cederberg Wilderness Area; Groot Winterhoek Wilderness Area; Boland Mountain Complex; De Hoop Nature Reserve; Boosmansbos Wilderness Area; Swartberg Complex; Baviaanskloof Mega Reserve
- Criteria: Natural: (ix), (x)
- Reference: 1007
- Inscription: 2004 (28th Session)
- Extensions: 2015
- Area: 1,094,742 ha (2,705,170 acres)
- Buffer zone: 798,514 ha (1,973,170 acres)
- Coordinates: 34°10′00″S 18°22′30″E

The Cape Floral Region is a floristic region located near the southern tip of South Africa. It is the only floristic region of the Cape Floristic Kingdom, and includes only one floristic province, known as the Cape Floristic Province.

The Cape Floristic Region, the smallest of the six recognized floral kingdoms of the world, is an area of high diversity and endemism, and is home to over 9,000 vascular plant species, of which 69 percent are endemic.

Much of this diversity is associated with the fynbos biome, a Mediterranean-type, fire-prone shrubland. The economical worth of fynbos biodiversity, based on harvests of fynbos products (e.g. wildflowers) and eco-tourism, is estimated to be in the region of R77 million (~US$5 million) a year.

== Location and description ==
Extent of the Greater Cape Floristic Region
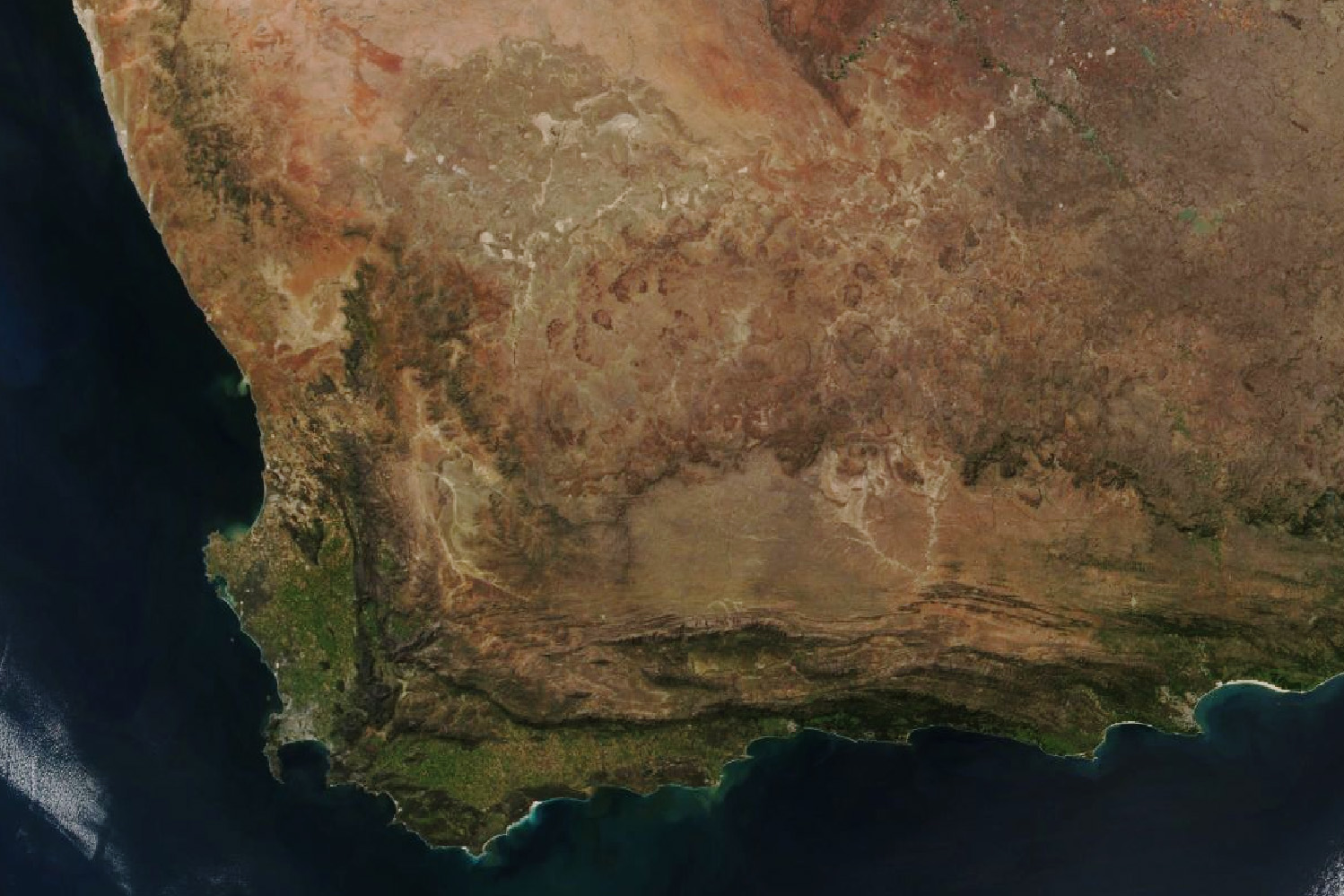
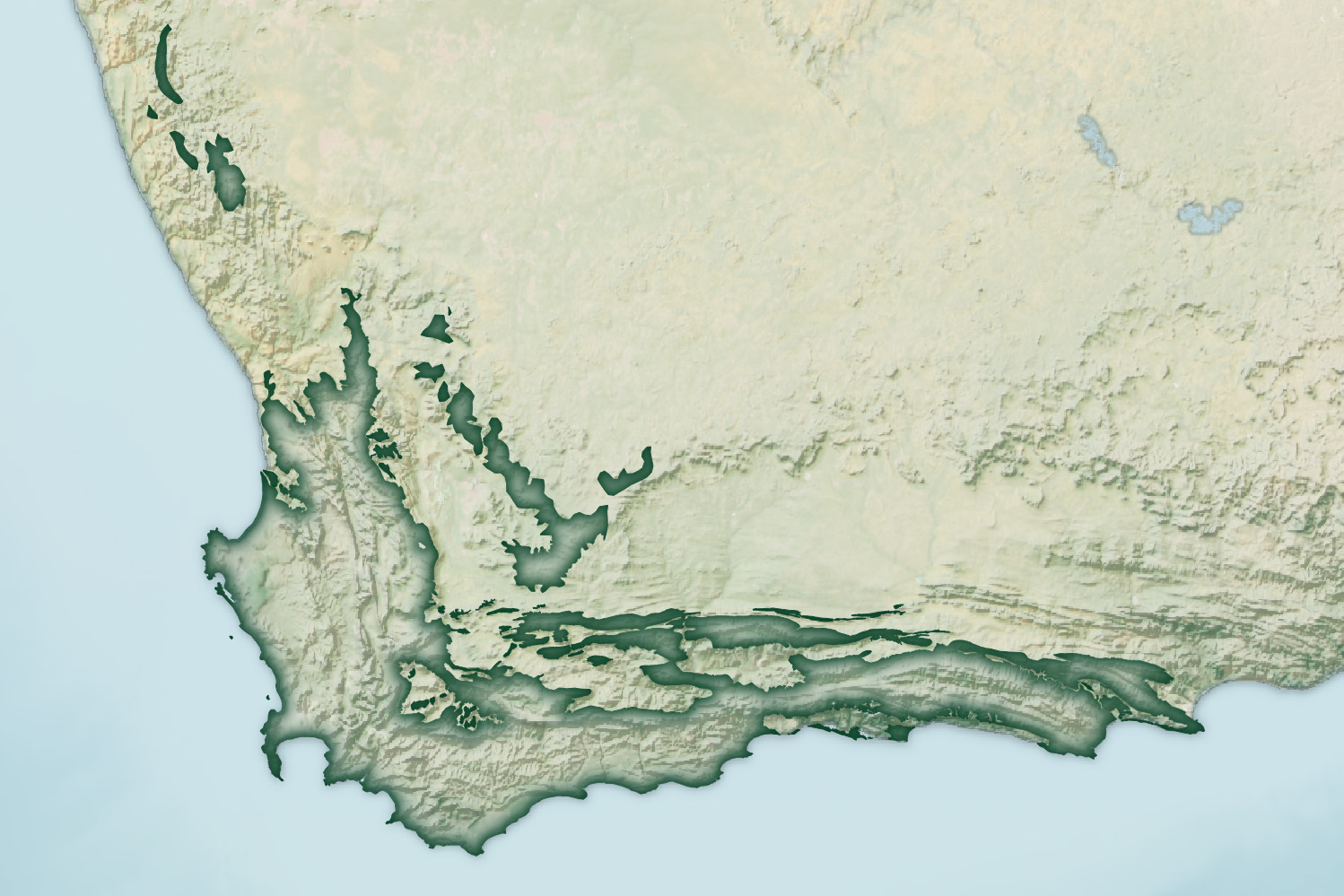
The region occupies less than 0.5% of Africa's land area but supports approximately 20% of its plant diversity.

Home to the greatest non-tropical concentration of higher plant species in the world, the region is the only hotspot that encompasses an entire floral kingdom, and holds five of South Africa's 12 endemic plant families and 160 endemic genera. Covering 78,555 km^{2}, Cape Floristic Region hotspot is located entirely within the borders of South Africa.

It is one of the five temperate Mediterranean-type systems on the hotspots list, and is one of only two hotspots that encompass an entire floral kingdom (the other being New Caledonia).

The Region covers the Mediterranean climate region of South Africa in the Western Cape in the southwestern corner of the country, and extends eastward into the Eastern Cape, a transitional zone between the winter rainfall region to the west and the summer-rainfall region to the east in KwaZulu-Natal.

== Flora ==
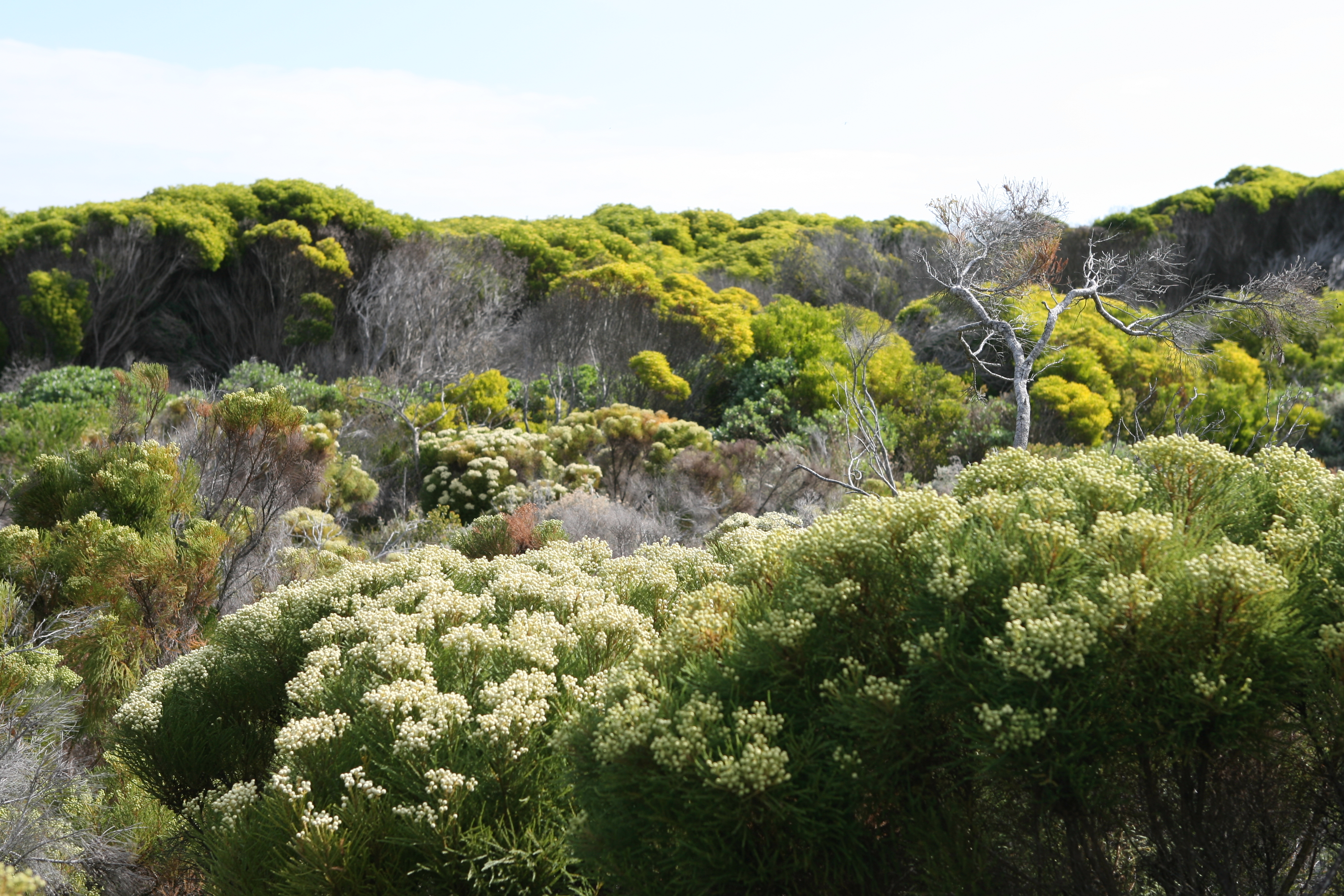
Fynbos in the Western Cape

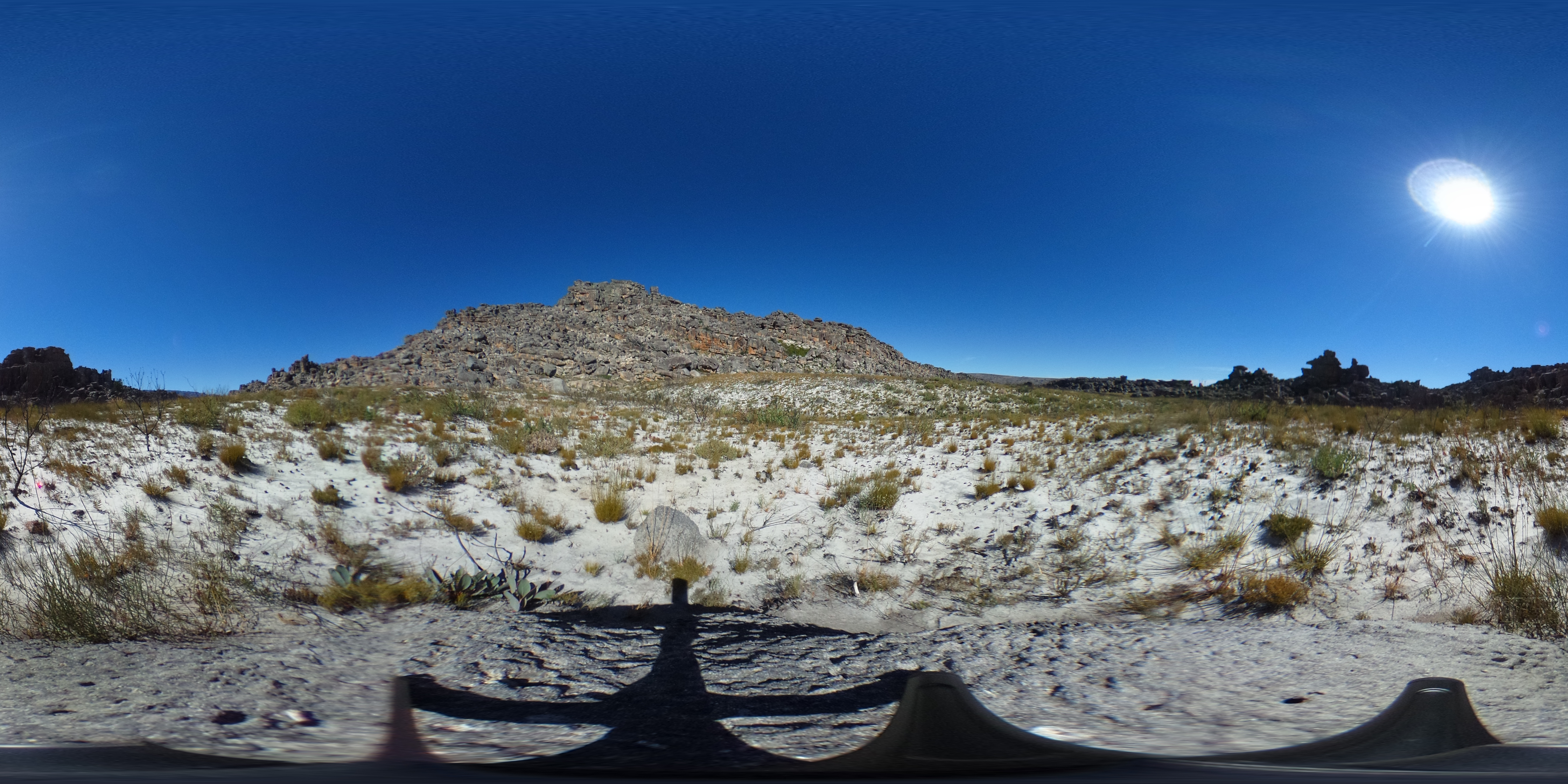
A 360 degree photograph of fynbos in the Groot Winterhoek region of the Western Cape about 18 months after a fire. New plants can be seen in various stages of growth following the fire. The infertile white soil that fynbos tends to grow in can also be clearly seen.

Most of the region is covered with fynbos, a sclerophyllous shrubland occurring on acid sands or nutrient-poor soils derived from Table Mountain sandstones (Cape Supergroup). Fynbos is home to a diverse plethora of plant species including many members of the protea family (Proteaceae), heath family (Ericaceae), and reed family of restios (Restionaceae). Other vegetation types are sandveld, a soft coastal scrubland found mostly on the west-facing coast of the Western Cape Province, on tertiary sands.

Renosterveld is a grassy shrubland dominated by members of the daisy family (Asteraceae), particularly renosterbos (Elytropappus rhinocerotis), graminoids and geophytes, occurring on the base-rich shaley soils of the coastal forelands. Small pockets of Afromontane forest (Southern Afrotemperate Forest) can be found in humid and sheltered areas.

According to Takhtajan (1978), the following families are endemic or subendemic to the region: Grubbiaceae, Roridulaceae, Bruniaceae, Penaeaceae, Greyiaceae, Geissolomataceae, Retziaceae (Retzia) and Stilbaceae.Rooibos is produced out of this region.

=== Vegetation types ===
List of vegetation types of the Cape Floristic Region:

- Atlantis Sand Fynbos – Vegetation type from north of Cape Town, in the Western Cape, South Africa
- Boland Granite Fynbos – Vegetation type endemic to the Western Cape, South Africa
- Cape Flats Dune Strandveld – Endangered vegetation type endemic to the coastal areas around Cape Town
- Cape Flats Sand Fynbos – Vegetation type endemic to the City of Cape Town
- Cape Lowland Freshwater Wetland – Vegetation type endemic to the Western Cape, South Africa
- Cape Winelands Shale Fynbos – Vegetation type in Western Cape, South Africa
- Hangklip Sand Fynbos – Vegetation type endemic to South Africa
- Kogelberg Sandstone Fynbos – Vegetation type endemic to the far south of the Western Cape, South Africa
- Lourensford Alluvium Fynbos – Vegetation type that is endemic to Cape Town, South Africa
- Peninsula Granite Fynbos – Vegetation type endemic to the city of Cape Town, South Africa
- Peninsula Sandstone Fynbos – Vegetation type endemic to the Cape Peninsula in Cape Town, South Africa
- Peninsula Shale Renosterveld – Vegetation type found only in South Africa
- Southern Afrotemperate Forest – Main indigenous forest-type in the south-western part of South Africa
- Swartland Alluvium Fynbos – Vegetation type endemic to South Africa
- Swartland Alluvium Renosterveld
- Swartland Granite Renosterveld
- Swartland Shale Renosterveld – Vegetation type endemic to the Western Cape, South Africa
- Swartland Silcrete Renosterveld

== Ecology ==
The World Wide Fund for Nature divides the Cape floristic region into three ecoregions: the Lowland fynbos and renosterveld, Montane fynbos and renosterveld and the Albany thickets.

The fynbos ecoregions are designated one of the Global 200 priority ecoregions for conservation. Conservation International declared the Cape floristic region to be a biodiversity hotspot.

It is thought that the Cape Floristic Region is experiencing one of the most rapid rates of extinction in the world due to habitat loss, land degradation, and invasive alien plants.

== Conservation ==
Conservation International’s South Africa programme, which later became the locally registered organisation Conservation South Africa, worked with local partners on conservation activities in parts of the Cape Floristic Region in the early 2000s.

== World Heritage Site ==
Biodiversity hotspots of the world showing the Cape Floristic Region (number 12)

In 2004, the "Cape Floral Region Protected Areas" were inscribed as a World Heritage Site. The site includes eight representative protected areas:

- Table Mountain National Park
- Cederberg Wilderness Area
- Groot Winterhoek Wilderness Area
- Boland Mountain Complex (Limietberg Nature Reserve, Jonkershoek Nature Reserve, Assegaaibosch Nature Reserve, Hottentots Holland Nature Reserve, Kogelberg Nature Reserve)
- De Hoop Nature Reserve
- Boosmansbos Wilderness Area
- Swartberg Complex (Swartberg Nature Reserve, Gamkapoort Nature Reserve, Towerkop Nature Reserve)
- Baviaanskloof Mega Reserve
