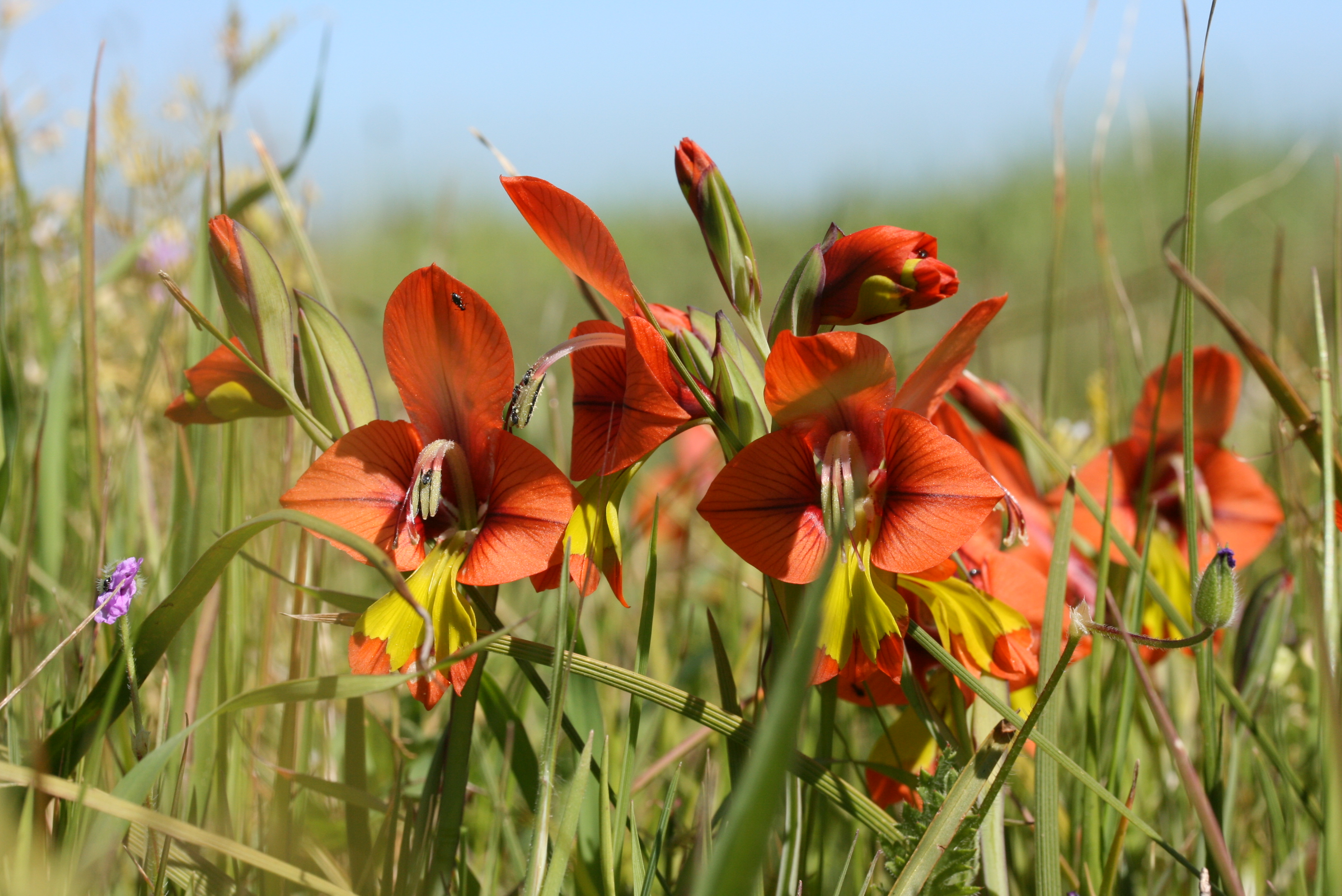

Scientific classification
- Kingdom: Plantae
- Clade: Tracheophytes
- Clade: Angiosperms
- Clade: Monocots
- Order: Asparagales
- Family: Iridaceae
- Genus: Gladiolus
- Species: G. alatus

Binomial name
- Gladiolus alatus L.

Synonyms
- List: Gladiolus alatus var. alatus; Gladiolus alatus var. algoensis Herb.; Gladiolus alatus var. uniflorus Klatt.; Gladiolus algoensis (Herb.) Sweet; Gladiolus galeatus Burm.f.; Gladiolus papilionaceus Licht.; Gladiolus papilionaceus Licht. ex Roem. & Schult.; Gladiolus uniflorus Klatt.; Hebea alata (L.) Eckl.; Hebea galeata (Burm.f.) Eckl.

= Gladiolus alatus =

Species of flowering plant

Gladiolus alatus is a species of geophyte from South Africa. Common names include painted ladies, king kalkoentjie and kipkippie. Kalkoentjie means "little turkey" in Afrikaans and refers to the shape of the flower, which resembles a turkey's wattle. It is popular as a garden plant and an important part of the cut flower industry in parts of the world on account of its large and showy orange flowers.

== Description ==
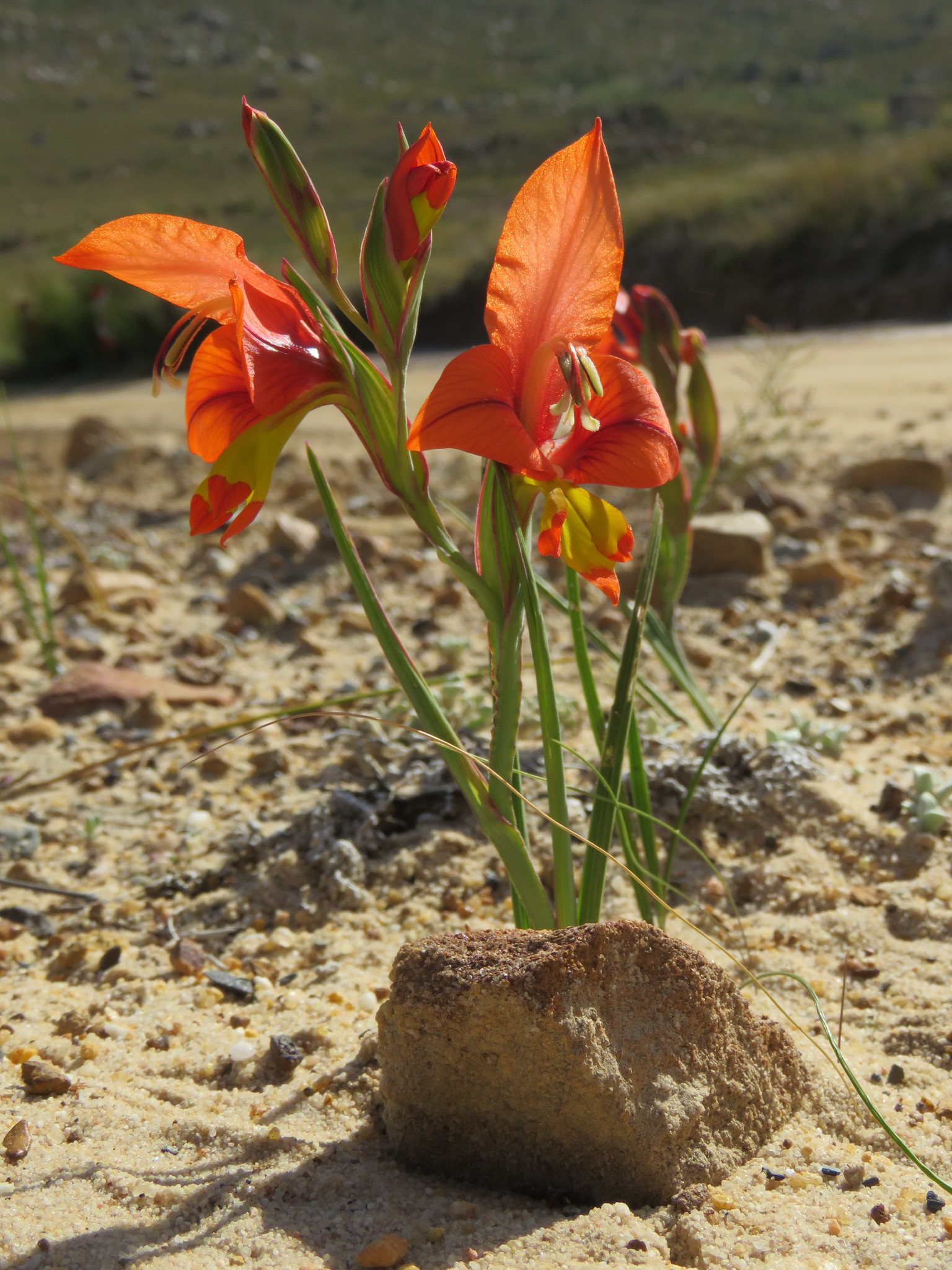
Gladiolus alatus growing on the Cedarberg Mountains

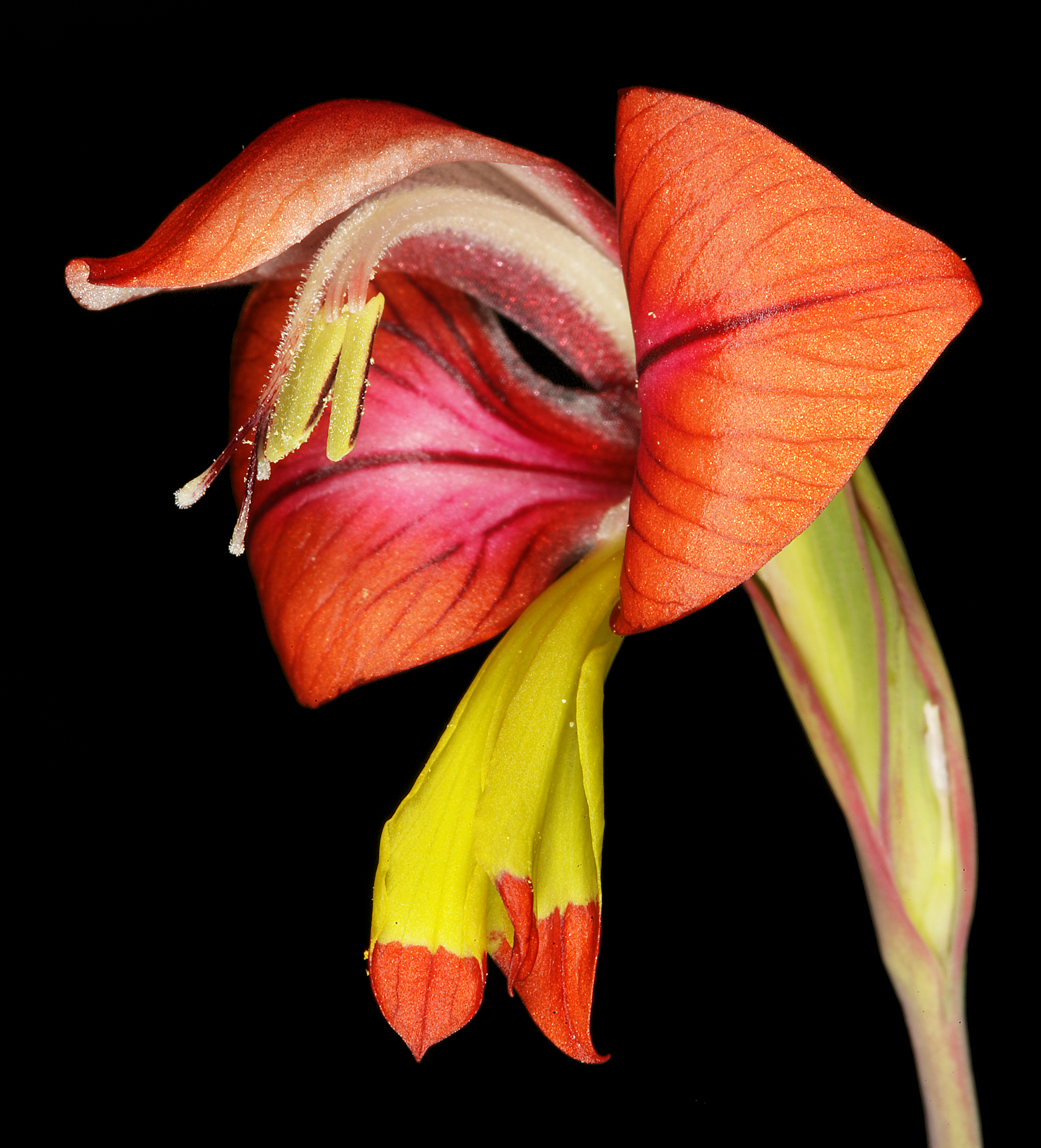
Gladiolus alatus flower from Nieuwoudtville showing the different coloured tepals and arched filaments.

=== Growth form ===
This cormous geophyte grows 8–25 cm (3.1–9.8 in) tall. The lower part of the lightly compressed stem is erect, flexing outward above third leaf. The stem is ridged or winged on at least one side. Although the stem is usually simple, some plants have one short stem. They often have a small cormlet in the subterranean leaf axils.

=== Corm ===
The corm has a depressed globose shape and a diameter of 12–16 mm (0.47–0.63 in). The tunics are usually papery but may sometimes be more fibrous. The tunics are brown or reddish-brown in colour.

=== Leaves ===
Each plant has three or four ribbed, lance- to sickle-shaped leaves. Rarely plants have five leaves. The lowest two or three leaves are basal. The lowest leaf is the longest (it approximately reaches the top of the floral spike), with higher leaves getting progressively smaller. They are often lightly rough with hairs or papillae. The uppermost leaf is often bract-like.

=== Flowers ===
Gladiolus alatus produces large orange flowers. Each plant has between two and eight flowers borne in a spike inflorescence. The lower halves of upper lateral tepals are covered in red hairs, the areas between them thickened into hairy, iridescent ridges. The lower tepals are yellow-green towards the base with orange tips. The funnel-shaped perianth tube is 10–14 mm (0.39–0.55 in), with anthers and stamens arising near the middle. The arched filaments are hairy and green or yellowish in colour with purple lines and bear stamens with yellowish pollen They are present between August and October and have a sweet scent. Each flower lasts about a week. The green floral bracts are strongly keeled and have purple margins. The inner bracts are slightly shorter and have two keels.

=== Seeds ===
The plant produces thin-walled capsules (10–25 mm (0.39–0.98 in) long containing seeds. the light brown seeds have a broad membranous wing with air pockets that assist with dispersal.

== Distribution and habitat ==
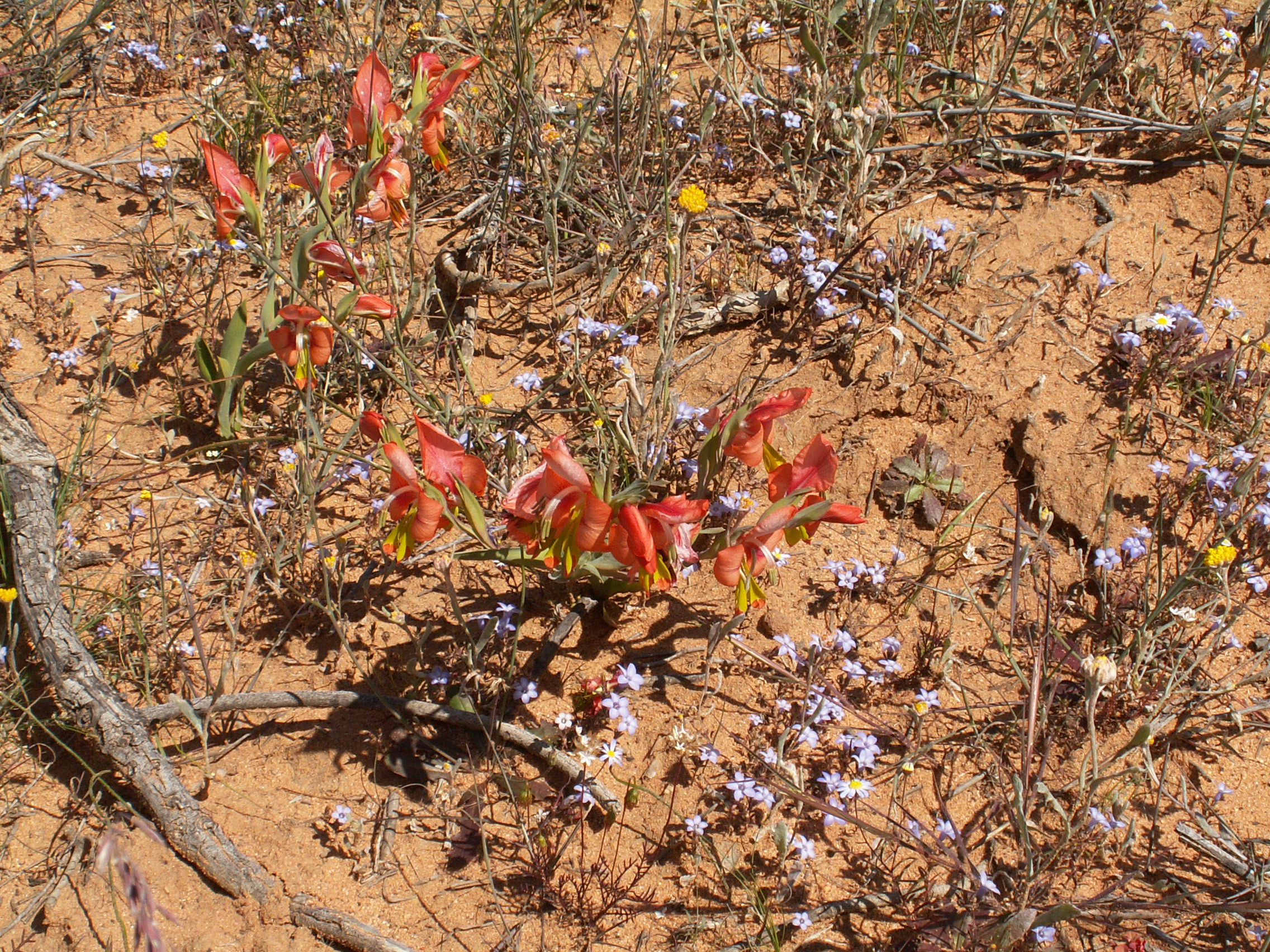
Gladiolus alatus in Clanwilliam, South Africa

This species is endemic to South Africa. It is found from southern Namaqualand to the Cape Peninsula in the south and Caledon and Bredasdorp in the east. It is found growing on slopes with sandstone and granitic soils.

== Taxonomy ==
Gladiolus alatus was one of the first gladiolus species to be illustrated. The genus name means "small sword" in Latin, referring to the sword-shaped leaves. The species epithet means "winged", likely referring to the wing-like upper perianth lobes or the winged seeds.

Historically, this species this species was considered to have five varieties. These are now considered to be separate species due to how much variety was found to exist between them.

- Gladiolus alatus var. alatus: The most widespread variety, showing the features typical of this species.
- Gladiolus alatus var. meliusculus (Darling to Malmesbury): Flowers are pale and softer with a green-ringed red base on each perianth lobe. This is now classified as Gladiolus meliusculus.
- Gladiolus alatus var. speciosus (Malmesbury to Clanwilliam): Plants belonging to this variety have a distinct yellow or greenish-yellow patch on the back of the upper lobes and contestably hooded dorsal lobe. This is now classified as Gladiolus speciosus.
- Gladiolus alatus var. pulcherrimus (from Clanwilliam and Piketberg): Plants have wider leaves and an inflorescence which branches more. Flowers have similar markings to Gladiolus speciosus. This is now classified as Gladiolus pulcherrimus.
- Gladiolus alatus var. pulcherrimus (from Gqeberha): Now extinct.

== Ecology ==
Plants are sometimes found growing inside clumps of restios in parts of its range. This helps to protect it from grazers and moles.

This species is mainly pollinated by solitary bees. The light, winged seeds are dispersed by the wind.

== Conservation ==
This species is classified as being of least concern by the South African National Biodiversity Institute. While it has lost parts of its habitat to agriculture, it remains common and is found at over forty sites.

== Uses ==
This species has commercial importance, both as a garden plant and in the cut flower industry. Several exotic cultivars are grown for commercial use, with some varieties (such as Pietmohlen and Florared) showing more desirable features than others. Pollen can be frozen for long-term storage.
