= Harmony Flats Nature Reserve =

Nature reserve in Cape Town, South Africa

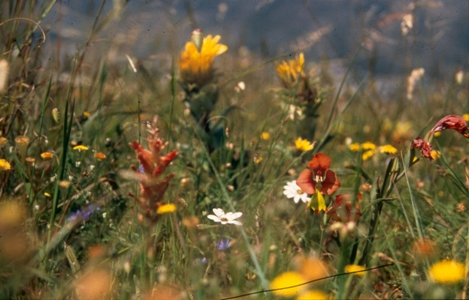
- Critically endangered Lourensford Alluvium Fynbos growing at Harmony Flats
- Location of Harmony Flats Nature Reserve
- Location: Strand, South Africa
- Coordinates: 34°08′18″S 18°51′33″E
- Area: 9 ha (22 acres)
- Established: 7 July 1989; 36 years ago
- Website: City of Cape - Harmony Flats Nature Reserve
- Harmony Flats Nature Reserve (Western Cape)

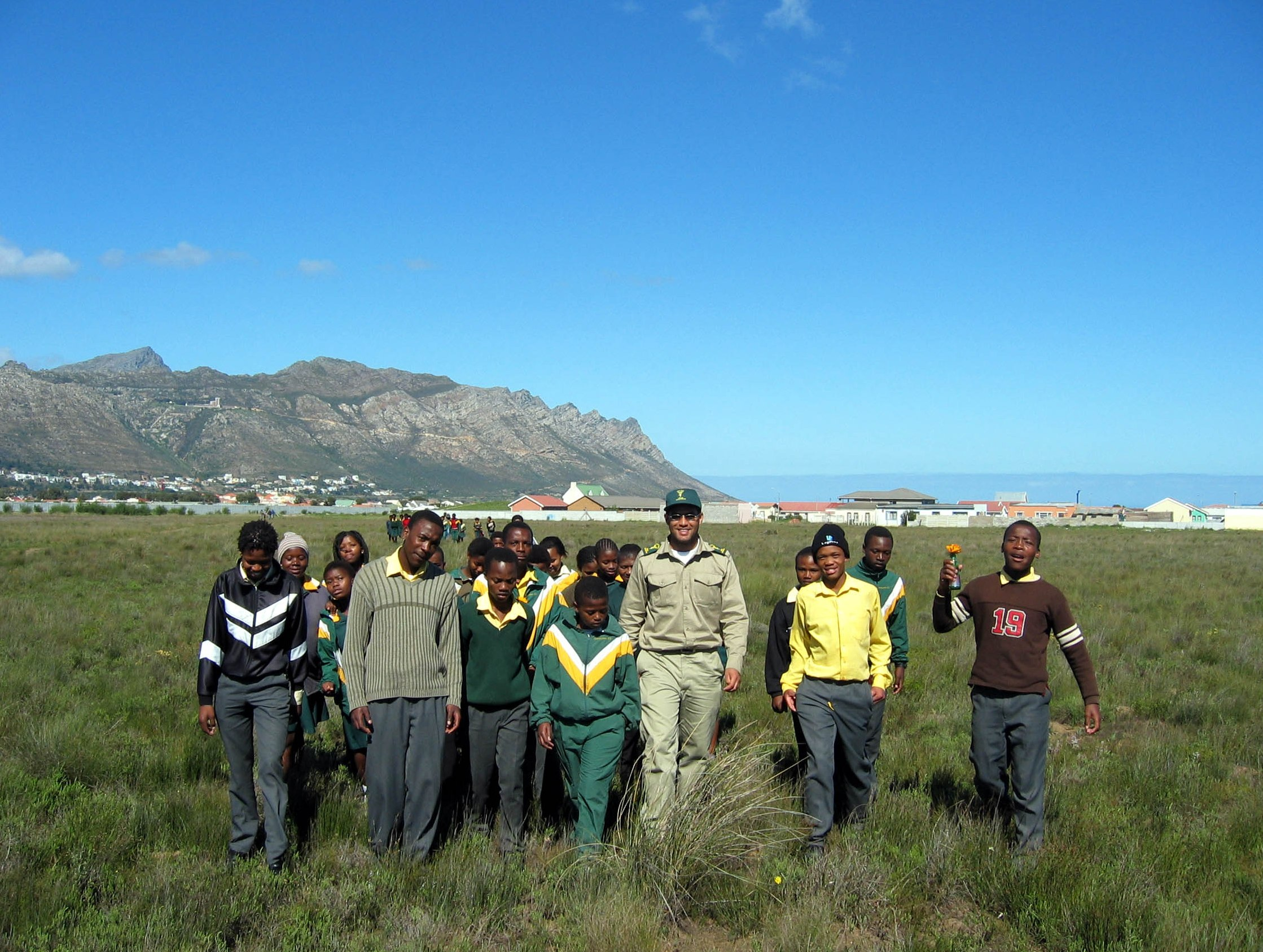
Harmony Flats is managed by local volunteers and community organisers

Harmony Flats Nature Reserve is a 9-hectare (22-acre) piece of protected land, located between Strand and Gordon's Bay, South Africa. It protects a surviving fragment of critically endangered Lourensford Alluvium Fynbos vegetation.

Harmony Flats was originally established to preserve a habitat for the rare and declining geometric tortoise (Psammobates geometricus). This tortoise is now locally extinct, but the reserve still protects about 220 species of plants (many of them endangered) as well as a range of animal species, such as the tiny parrot-beaked tortoise (Homopus areolatus), various snakes and a large variety of birds. This is one of the few remaining spots of the critically endangered vegetation type Lourensford Alluvium Fynbos. Local volunteers and community organisations are now heavily involved in protecting and managing the reserve.

== See also ==
- Biodiversity of Cape Town
- List of nature reserves in Cape Town
- Geometric tortoise
- Lourensford Alluvium Fynbos
