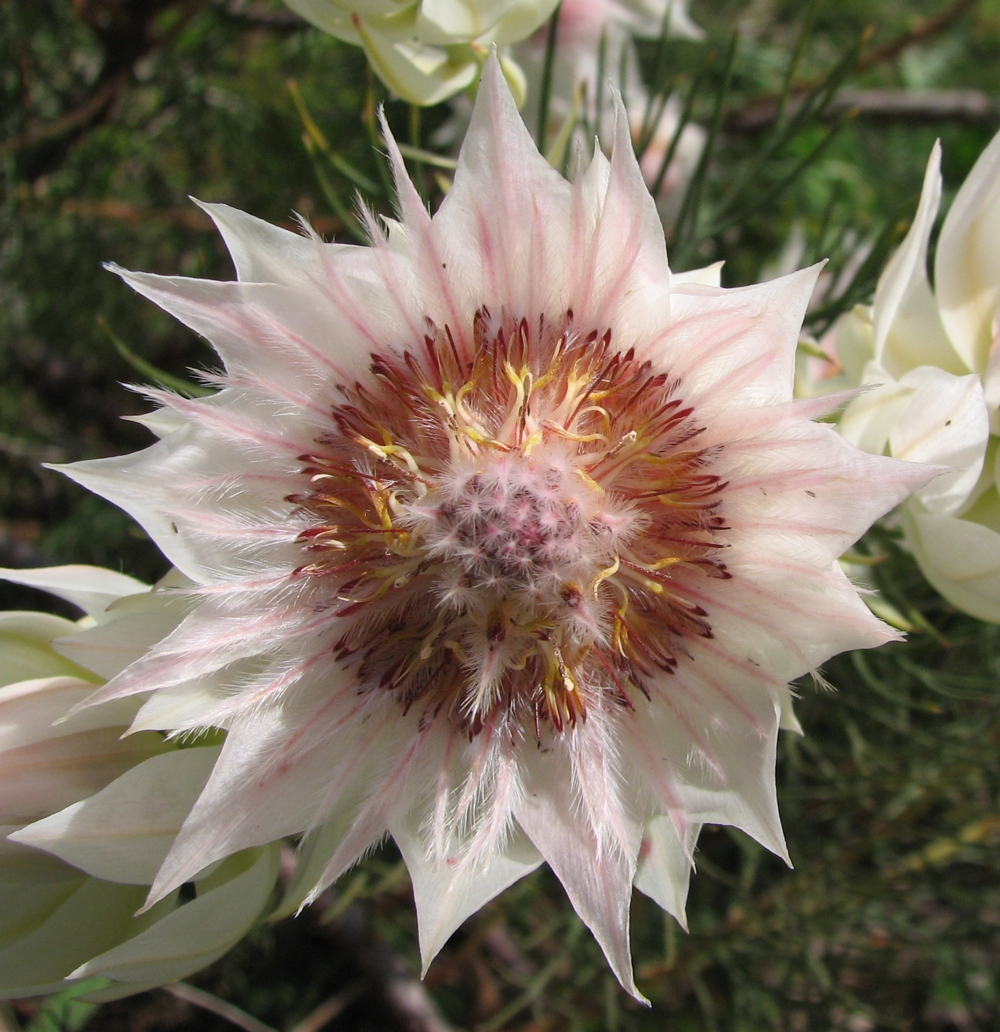

Conservation status
- Critically Endangered (IUCN 3.1)

Scientific classification
- Kingdom: Plantae
- Clade: Embryophytes
- Clade: Tracheophytes
- Clade: Angiosperms
- Clade: Eudicots
- Order: Proteales
- Family: Proteaceae
- Genus: Serruria
- Species: S. florida

Binomial name
- Serruria florida (Thunb.) Knight

Synonyms
- Protea florida Thunb.

= Serruria florida =

Species of flowering plant endemic to South Africa

Serruria florida is a species of flowering plant in the family Proteaceae, endemic to South Africa. It is known by the common names of blushing bride or pride of Franschhoek.

This species grows to between 0.8 and 1.5 metres (2 ft 7 in and 4 ft 11 in) in height and 0.5 metres (1 ft 8 in) in width. The leaves are fine and dissected and the flowers are white to pink and appear from July to October in its native range.

It occurs in the Hottentots Holland Nature Reserve in the Cape Province.

A well-drained position in full sun is preferred by this species, which tolerates dryness. Propagation is from cuttings or seed, although the latter can prove difficult.

The species is cultivated for the cut flower trade and it is also grown as an ornamental plant.
