= List of Orchidaceae of South Africa =

List of flowering plants in the family Orchidaceae recorded from South Africa

Orchidaceae is a family of flowering plants (anthophytes) in the order Asparagales .

23,420 species of vascular plant have been recorded in South Africa, making it the sixth most species-rich country in the world and the most species-rich country on the African continent. Of these, 153 species are considered to be threatened. Nine biomes have been described in South Africa: Fynbos, Succulent Karoo, desert, Nama Karoo, grassland, savanna, Albany thickets, the Indian Ocean coastal belt, and forests.

The 2018 South African National Biodiversity Institute's National Biodiversity Assessment plant checklist lists 35,130 taxa in the phyla Anthocerotophyta (hornworts (6)), Anthophyta (flowering plants (33534)), Bryophyta (mosses (685)), Cycadophyta (cycads (42)), Lycopodiophyta (Lycophytes(45)), Marchantiophyta (liverworts (376)), Pinophyta (conifers (33)), and Pteridophyta (cryptogams (408)).

67 genera are represented in the literature. Listed taxa include species, subspecies, varieties, and forms as recorded, some of which have subsequently been allocated to other taxa as synonyms, in which cases the accepted taxon is appended to the listing. Multiple entries under alternative names reflect taxonomic revision over time.

== Acampe ==
Genus Acampe:

- Acampe pachyglossa Rchb.f. indigenous
- Acampe praemorsa (Roxb.) Blatt. & McCann, accepted as Acampe pachyglossa Rchb.f. indigenous

== Acrolophia ==
Genus Acrolophia:

- Acrolophia barbata (Thunb.) H.P.Linder, accepted as Acrolophia lunata (Schltr.) Schltr. & Bolus, endemic
- Acrolophia bolusii Rolfe, endemic
- Acrolophia capensis (P.J.Bergius) Fourc. endemic
  - Acrolophia capensis (P.J.Bergius) Fourc. var. lamellata (Lindl.) Schelpe, accepted as Acrolophia lamellata (Lindl.) Pfitzer, indigenous
- Acrolophia cochlearis (Lindl.) Schltr. & Bolus, endemic
- Acrolophia comosa (Sond.) Schltr. & Bolus, accepted as Acrolophia capensis (P.J.Bergius) Fourc. indigenous
- Acrolophia fimbriata Schltr. accepted as Acrolophia micrantha (Lindl.) Pfitzer, indigenous
- Acrolophia lamellata (Lindl.) Pfitzer, endemic
- Acrolophia lunata (Schltr.) Schltr. & Bolus, endemic
- Acrolophia micrantha (Lindl.) Pfitzer, endemic
- Acrolophia parvula Schltr. accepted as Acrolophia ustulata (Bolus) Schltr. & Bolus, indigenous
- Acrolophia sphaerocarpa (Sond.) Schltr. & Bolus, accepted as Acrolophia capensis (P.J.Bergius) Fourc. indigenous
- Acrolophia triste (L.f.) Schltr. & Bolus, accepted as Acrolophia capensis (P.J.Bergius) Fourc. indigenous
- Acrolophia ustulata (Bolus) Schltr. & Bolus, endemic

== Aerangis ==
Genus Aerangis:

- Aerangis kirkii (Rchb.f.) Schltr. indigenous
- Aerangis mystacidii (Rchb.f.) Schltr. indigenous
- Aerangis somalensis (Schltr.) Schltr. indigenous
- Aerangis verdickii (De Wild.) Schltr. indigenous
  - Aerangis verdickii (De Wild.) Schltr. var. verdickii, indigenous

== Aeranthes ==
Genus Aeranthes:

- Aeranthes gracilis (Harv.) Rchb.f. accepted as Mystacidium gracile Harv. indigenous

== Angraecum ==
Genus Angraecum:

- Angraecum aphyllum Thouars, accepted as Microcoelia aphylla (Thouars) Summerh. indigenous
- Angraecum chamaeanthus Schltr. indigenous
- Angraecum conchiferum Lindl. indigenous
- Angraecum cultriforme Summerh. indigenous
- Angraecum pusillum Lindl. indigenous
- Angraecum sacciferum Lindl. indigenous
- Angraecum stella-africae P.J.Cribb, indigenous

== Ansellia ==
Genus Ansellia:

- Ansellia africana Lindl. indigenous

== Bartholina ==
Genus Bartholina:

- Bartholina burmanniana (L.) Ker Gawl. endemic
- Bartholina etheliae Bolus, indigenous

== Bolusiella ==
Genus Bolusiella:

- Bolusiella maudiae (Bolus) Schltr. indigenous

== Bonatea ==
Genus Bonatea:

- Bonatea bracteata G.J.McDonald & McMurtry, accepted as Habenaria transvaalensis Schltr. endemic
- Bonatea cassidea Sond. indigenous
- Bonatea lamprophylla J.L.Stewart, endemic
- Bonatea polypodantha (Rchb.f.) L.Bolus, indigenous
- Bonatea porrecta (Bolus) Summerh. indigenous
- Bonatea pulchella Summerh. indigenous
- Bonatea saundersiae (Harv.) T.Durand & Schinz, accepted as Bonatea cassidea Sond.
- Bonatea saundersioides (Kraenzl. & Schltr.) Cortesi, indigenous
- Bonatea speciosa (L.f.) Willd. indigenous
  - Bonatea speciosa (L.f.) Willd. var. antennifera (Rolfe) Sommerv. accepted as Bonatea antennifera Rolfe, indigenous
- Bonatea steudneri (Rchb.f.) T.Durand & Schinz, indigenous

== Brachycorythis ==
Genus Brachycorythis:

- Brachycorythis conica (Summerh.) Summerh. indigenous
  - Brachycorythis conica (Summerh.) Summerh. subsp. transvaalensis Summerh. endemic
- Brachycorythis inhambanensis (Schltr.) Schltr. endemic
- Brachycorythis macowaniana Rchb.f. endemic
- Brachycorythis ovata Lindl. indigenous
  - Brachycorythis ovata Lindl. subsp. ovata, indigenous
- Brachycorythis pleistophylla Rchb.f. indigenous
  - Brachycorythis pleistophylla Rchb.f. subsp. pleistophylla, indigenous
- Brachycorythis pubescens Harv. indigenous
- Brachycorythis tenuior Rchb.f. indigenous

== Brownleea ==
Genus Brownleea:

- Brownleea coerulea Harv. ex Lindl. indigenous
- Brownleea galpinii Bolus, indigenous
  - Brownleea galpinii Bolus subsp. galpinii, indigenous
  - Brownleea galpinii Bolus subsp. major (Bolus) H.P.Linder, indigenous
- Brownleea graminicola McMurtry, indigenous
- Brownleea macroceras Sond. indigenous
- Brownleea parviflora Harv. ex Lindl. indigenous
- Brownleea recurvata Sond. endemic

== Bulbophyllum ==
Genus Bulbophyllum:

- Bulbophyllum elliotii Rolfe, indigenous
- Bulbophyllum longiflorum Thouars, indigenous
- Bulbophyllum malawiense Morris, accepted as Bulbophyllum elliotii Rolfe
- Bulbophyllum sandersonii (Hook.f.) Rchb.f. indigenous
- Bulbophyllum sandersonii (Hook.f.) Rchb.f. subsp. sandersonii, indigenous
- Bulbophyllum scaberulum (Rolfe) Bolus, indigenous
  - Bulbophyllum scaberulum (Rolfe) Bolus var. scaberulum, indigenous

== Calanthe ==
Genus Calanthe:

- Calanthe sylvatica (Thouars) Lindl. indigenous

== Centrostigma ==
Genus Centrostigma:

- Centrostigma occultans (Welw. ex Rchb.f.) Schltr. indigenous

== Ceratandra ==
Genus Ceratandra:

- Ceratandra atrata (L.) T.Durand & Schinz, endemic
- Ceratandra bicolor Sond. ex Bolus, endemic
- Ceratandra globosa Lindl. endemic
- Ceratandra grandiflora Lindl. endemic
- Ceratandra harveyana Lindl. endemic
- Ceratandra venosa (Lindl.) Schltr. endemic

== Cheirostylis ==
Genus Cheirostylis:

- Cheirostylis gymnochiloides (Ridl.) Rchb.f. accepted as Cheirostylis nuda (Thouars) Ormerod, indigenous
- Cheirostylis nuda (Thouars) Ormerod, indigenous

== Cirrhopetalum ==
Genus Cirrhopetalum:

- Cirrhopetalum umbellatum (G.Forst.) Hook. & Arn. accepted as Bulbophyllum longiflorum Thouars

== Corycium ==
Genus Corycium:

- Corycium alticola Parkman & Schelpe, accepted as Pterygodium alticola (Parkman & Schelpe) J.C.Manning & Goldblatt, indigenous
- Corycium bicolorum (Thunb.) Sw. accepted as Pterygodium bicolorum (Thunb.) Schltr. endemic
- Corycium bifidum Sond. accepted as Pterygodium bifidum (Sond.) Schltr. endemic
- Corycium carnosum (Lindl.) Rolfe, accepted as Evotella carnosa (Lindl.) J.C.Manning & Goldblatt, endemic
- Corycium crispum (Thunb.) Sw. accepted as Pterygodium crispum (Thunb.) Schltr. endemic
- Corycium deflexum (Bolus) Rolfe, accepted as Pterygodium deflexum Bolus, endemic
- Corycium dracomontanum Parkman & Schelpe, accepted as Pterygodium dracomontanum (Parkman & Schelpe) J.C.Manning & Goldblatt, indigenous
- Corycium excisum Lindl. accepted as Pterygodium excisum (Lindl.) Schltr. endemic
- Corycium flanaganii (Bolus) Kurzweil & H.P.Linder, accepted as Pterygodium flanaganii Bolus, indigenous
- Corycium ingeanum E.G.H.Oliv. accepted as Pterygodium ingeanum (E.G.H.Oliv.) J.C.Manning & Goldblatt, endemic
- Corycium microglossum Lindl. accepted as Pterygodium microglossum (Lindl.) Schltr. endemic
- Corycium nigrescens Sond. accepted as Pterygodium nigrescens (Sond.) Schltr. indigenous
- Corycium orobanchoides (L.f.) Sw. accepted as Pterygodium orobanchoides (L.f.) Schltr. endemic
- Corycium tricuspidatum Bolus, accepted as Pterygodium tricuspidatum (Bolus) Schltr. indigenous

== Corymborkis ==
Genus Corymborkis:

- Corymborkis corymbis Thouars, indigenous

== Cymbidium ==
Genus Cymbidium:

- Cymbidium aculeatum (L.f.) Sw. accepted as Orthochilus aculeatus (L.f.) Bytebier, indigenous
- Cymbidium adenoglossum Lindl. accepted as Orthochilus adenoglossus (Lindl.) Bytebier, indigenous
- Cymbidium ustulatum Bolus, accepted as Acrolophia ustulata (Bolus) Schltr. & Bolus, indigenous

== Cynorkis ==
Genus Cynorkis:

- Cynorkis compacta (Rchb.f.) Rolfe, endemic
- Cynorkis kassneriana Kraenzl. indigenous

== Cyrtorchis ==
Genus Cyrtorchis:

- Cyrtorchis arcuata (Lindl.) Schltr. indigenous
  - Cyrtorchis arcuata (Lindl.) Schltr. subsp. arcuata, indigenous
- Cyrtorchis praetermissa Summerh. indigenous
  - Cyrtorchis praetermissa Summerh. subsp. praetermissa, indigenous
  - Cyrtorchis praetermissa Summerh. subsp. zuluensis (E.R.Harrison) H.P.Linder, endemic

== Diaphananthe ==
Genus Diaphananthe:

- Diaphananthe caffra (Bolus) H.P.Linder, accepted as Margelliantha caffra (Bolus) P.J.Cribb & J.Stewart, endemic
- Diaphananthe fragrantissima (Rchb.f.) Schltr. indigenous
- Diaphananthe millarii (Bolus) H.P.Linder, endemic
- Diaphananthe xanthopollinia (Rchb.f.) Summerh. accepted as Rhipidoglossum xanthopollinium (Rchb.f.) Schltr. endemic

== Didymoplexis ==
Genus Didymoplexis:

- Didymoplexis verrucosa J.Stewart & Hennessy, endemic

== Disa ==
Genus Disa:

- Disa aconitoides Sond. indigenous
  - Disa aconitoides Sond. subsp. aconitoides, indigenous
- Disa afra Bolus, indigenous
- Disa albomagentea E.G.H.Oliv. & Liltved, indigenous
- Disa alticola H.P.Linder, endemic
- Disa amoena H.P.Linder, endemic
- Disa arida Vlok, endemic
- Disa aristata H.P.Linder, endemic
- Disa atricapilla (Harv. ex Lindl.) Bolus, endemic
- Disa atrorubens Schltr. endemic
- Disa aurata (Bolus) L.T.Parker & Koop. endemic
- Disa barbata (L.f.) Sw. endemic
- Disa basutorum Schltr. indigenous
- Disa baurii Bolus, indigenous
- Disa begleyi L.Bolus, endemic
- Disa bifida (Thunb.) Sw. endemic
- Disa biflora (L.) Druce, indigenous
- Disa bivalvata (L.f.) T.Durand & Schinz, endemic
- Disa bodkinii Bolus, endemic
- Disa bolusiana Schltr. endemic
- Disa brachyceras Lindl. endemic
- Disa bracteata Sw. endemic
- Disa brevicornis (Lindl.) Bolus, indigenous
- Disa brevipetala H.P.Linder, endemic
- Disa cardinalis H.P.Linder, endemic
- Disa caulescens Lindl. endemic
- Disa cedarbergensis H.P.Linder, endemic
- Disa cephalotes Rchb.f. indigenous
  - Disa cephalotes Rchb.f. subsp. cephalotes, indigenous
  - Disa cephalotes Rchb.f. subsp. frigida (Schltr.) H.P.Linder, indigenous
- Disa cernua (Thunb.) Sw. endemic
- Disa chrysostachya Sw. indigenous
- Disa clavicornis H.P.Linder, endemic
- Disa cochlearis S.D.Johnson & Liltved, endemic
- Disa comosa (Rchb.f.) Schltr. endemic
- Disa conferta Bolus, endemic
- Disa cooperi Rchb.f. indigenous
- Disa cornuta (L.) Sw. indigenous
- Disa crassicornis Lindl. indigenous
- Disa cylindrica (Thunb.) Sw. endemic
- Disa densiflora (Lindl.) Bolus, endemic
- Disa dracomontana Schelpe ex H.P.Linder, endemic
- Disa draconis (L.f.) Sw. endemic
- Disa ecalcarata (G.J.Lewis) H.P.Linder, endemic
- Disa elegans Sond. ex Rchb.f. endemic
- Disa esterhuyseniae Schelpe ex H.P.Linder, endemic
- Disa extinctoria Rchb.f. indigenous
- Disa fasciata Lindl. endemic
- Disa ferruginea (Thunb.) Sw. endemic
- Disa filicornis (L.f.) Thunb. endemic
- Disa flexuosa (L.) Sw. endemic
- Disa forcipata Schltr. endemic
- Disa forficaria Bolus, endemic
- Disa fragrans Schltr. indigenous
  - Disa fragrans Schltr. subsp. fragrans, indigenous
- Disa galpinii Rolfe, endemic
- Disa gladioliflora Burch. ex Lindl. indigenous
  - Disa gladioliflora Burch. ex Lindl. subsp. capricornis (Rchb.f.) H.P.Linder, endemic
  - Disa gladioliflora Burch. ex Lindl. subsp. gladioliflora, endemic
- Disa glandulosa Burch. ex Lindl. endemic
- Disa graminifolia Ker Gawl. ex Spreng. endemic
- Disa hallackii Rolfe, endemic
- Disa harveiana Lindl. indigenous
  - Disa harveiana Lindl. subsp. harveiana, endemic
  - Disa harveiana Lindl. subsp. longicalcarata S.D.Johnson & H.P.Linder, endemic
- Disa hians (L.f.) Spreng. endemic
- Disa hircicornis Rchb.f. indigenous
- Disa inflexa (Lindl.) Bolus, endemic
- Disa introrsa Kurzweil, Liltved & H.P.Linder, endemic
- Disa karooica S.D.Johnson & H.P.Linder, endemic
- Disa klugei McMurtry, endemic
- Disa linderiana Bytebier & E.G.H.Oliv. endemic
- Disa lineata Bolus, endemic
- Disa longicornu L.f. endemic
- Disa longifolia Lindl. endemic
- Disa longipetala (Lindl.) Bolus, endemic
- Disa lugens Bolus, indigenous
  - Disa lugens Bolus var. lugens, endemic
  - Disa lugens Bolus var. nigrescens (H.P.Linder) H.P.Linder, endemic
- Disa macrostachya (Lindl.) Bolus, endemic
- Disa maculata L.f. endemic
- Disa maculomarronina McMurtry, endemic
- Disa marlothii Bolus, endemic
- Disa micropetala Schltr. endemic
- Disa minor (Sond.) Rchb.f. endemic
- Disa montana Sond. endemic
- Disa multifida Lindl. endemic
- Disa neglecta Sond. endemic
- Disa nervosa Lindl. indigenous
- Disa newdigateae L.Bolus, endemic
- Disa nivea H.P.Linder, indigenous
- Disa nubigena H.P.Linder, endemic
- Disa obliqua (Lindl.) Bolus, endemic
  - Disa obliqua (Lindl.) Bolus subsp. clavigera (Lindl.) Bytebier, endemic
  - Disa obliqua (Lindl.) Bolus subsp. obliqua, endemic
- Disa obtusa Lindl. indigenous
  - Disa obtusa Lindl. subsp. hottentotica H.P.Linder, endemic
  - Disa obtusa Lindl. subsp. obtusa, endemic
  - Disa obtusa Lindl. subsp. picta (Sond.) H.P.Linder, endemic
- Disa ocellata Bolus, endemic
- Disa oligantha Rchb.f. endemic
- Disa ophrydea (Lindl.) Bolus, endemic
- Disa oreophila Bolus, indigenous
  - Disa oreophila Bolus subsp. erecta H.P.Linder, indigenous
  - Disa oreophila Bolus subsp. oreophila, endemic
- Disa ovalifolia Sond. endemic
- Disa patula Sond. indigenous
  - Disa patula Sond. var. patula, endemic
  - Disa patula Sond. var. transvaalensis Summerh. indigenous
- Disa perplexa H.P.Linder, indigenous
- Disa physodes Sw. endemic
- Disa pillansii L.Bolus, endemic
- Disa polygonoides Lindl. indigenous
- Disa porrecta Sw. indigenous
- Disa procera H.P.Linder, endemic
- Disa pulchra Sond. indigenous
- Disa purpurascens Bolus, endemic
- Disa pygmaea Bolus, endemic
- Disa racemosa L.f. endemic
- Disa remota H.P.Linder, endemic
- Disa reticulata Bolus, endemic
- Disa rhodantha Schltr. indigenous
- Disa richardiana Lehm. ex Bolus, endemic
- Disa rosea Lindl. endemic
- Disa roseovittata McMurtry, endemic
- Disa rufescens (Thunb.) Sw. endemic
- Disa sabulosa Bolus, endemic
- Disa sagittalis (L.f.) Sw. endemic
- Disa salteri G.J.Lewis, endemic
- Disa sanguinea Sond. endemic
- Disa sankeyi Rolfe, indigenous
- Disa satyrioides (L.) Bytebier, accepted as Disa biflora (L.) Druce
- Disa saxicola Schltr. indigenous
- Disa schizodioides Sond. endemic
- Disa schlechteriana Bolus, endemic
- Disa scullyi Bolus, endemic
- Disa similis Summerh. endemic
- Disa spathulata (L.f.) Sw. indigenous
  - Disa spathulata (L.f.) Sw. subsp. spathulata, endemic
  - Disa spathulata (L.f.) Sw. subsp. tripartita (Lindl.) H.P.Linder, endemic
- Disa stachyoides Rchb.f. indigenous
- Disa staerkeriana McMurtry & Bytebier, endemic
- Disa stricta Sond. indigenous
- Disa subtenuicornis H.P.Linder, endemic
- Disa telipogonis Rchb.f. endemic
- Disa tenella (L.f.) Sw. indigenous
  - Disa tenella (L.f.) Sw. subsp. pusilla H.P.Linder, endemic
  - Disa tenella (L.f.) Sw. subsp. tenella, endemic
- Disa tenuicornis Bolus, endemic
- Disa tenuifolia Sw. endemic
- Disa tenuis Lindl. endemic
- Disa thodei Schltr. ex Kraenzl. indigenous
- Disa triloba Lindl. endemic
- Disa tripetaloides (L.f.) N.E.Br. endemic
  - Disa tripetaloides (L.f.) N.E.Br. subsp. aurata (Bolus) H.P.Linder, accepted as Disa aurata (Bolus) L.T.Parker & Koop.
- Disa tysonii Bolus, indigenous
- Disa uncinata Bolus, endemic
- Disa uniflora P.J.Bergius, endemic
- Disa vaginata Harv. ex Lindl. endemic
- Disa vasselotii Bolus ex Schltr. endemic
- Disa venosa Sw. endemic
- Disa venusta Bolus, endemic
- Disa versicolor Rchb.f. indigenous
- Disa vigilans McMurtry, T.J.Edwards & Bytebier, endemic
- Disa virginalis H.P.Linder, endemic
- Disa welwitschii Rchb.f. indigenous
  - Disa welwitschii Rchb.f. subsp. welwitschii, indigenous
- Disa woodii Schltr. indigenous
- Disa x brendae H.P.Linder, endemic
- Disa x nuwebergensis H.P.Linder, endemic
- Disa x paludicola J.Stewart & J.C.Manning, endemic
- Disa zimbabweensis H.P.Linder, indigenous
- Disa zuluensis Rolfe, endemic

== Disperis ==
Genus Disperis:

- Disperis anthoceros Rchb.f. indigenous
  - Disperis anthoceros Rchb.f. var. anthoceros, indigenous
- Disperis bodkinii Bolus, endemic
- Disperis bolusiana Schltr. ex Bolus, indigenous
  - Disperis bolusiana Schltr. ex Bolus subsp. bolusiana, endemic
  - Disperis bolusiana Schltr. ex Bolus subsp. macrocorys (Rolfe) J.C.Manning, endemic
- Disperis capensis (L.f.) Sw. indigenous
  - Disperis capensis (L.f.) Sw. var. brevicaudata Rolfe, endemic
  - Disperis capensis (L.f.) Sw. var. capensis, endemic
- Disperis cardiophora Harv. indigenous
- Disperis circumflexa (L.) T.Durand & Schinz, indigenous
  - Disperis circumflexa (L.) T.Durand & Schinz subsp. aemula (Schltr.) J.C.Manning, endemic
  - Disperis circumflexa (L.) T.Durand & Schinz subsp. circumflexa, endemic
- Disperis concinna Schltr. endemic
- Disperis cooperi Harv. endemic
- Disperis cucullata Sw. endemic
- Disperis disaeformis Schltr. endemic
- Disperis fanniniae Harv. indigenous
- Disperis johnstonii Rchb.f. ex Rolfe, indigenous
- Disperis lindleyana Rchb.f. indigenous
- Disperis macowanii Bolus, indigenous
- Disperis micrantha Lindl. indigenous
- Disperis oxyglossa Bolus, endemic
- Disperis paludosa Harv. ex Lindl. endemic
- Disperis purpurata Rchb.f. indigenous
  - Disperis purpurata Rchb.f. subsp. pallescens Bruyns, endemic
  - Disperis purpurata Rchb.f. subsp. purpurata, endemic
- Disperis renibractea Schltr. endemic
- Disperis stenoplectron Rchb.f. indigenous
- Disperis thorncroftii Schltr. indigenous
- Disperis tysonii Bolus, indigenous
- Disperis villosa (L.f.) Sw. endemic
- Disperis virginalis Schltr. indigenous
- Disperis wealei Rchb.f. indigenous
- Disperis woodii Bolus, endemic

== Dracomonticola ==
Genus Dracomonticola:

- Dracomonticola virginea (Bolus) H.P.Linder & Kurzweil, indigenous

== Eulophia ==
Genus Eulophia:

- Eulophia aculeata (L.f.) Spreng., indigenous
- Eulophia adenoglossa (Lindl.) Rchb.f., indigenous
- Eulophia angolensis (Rchb.f.) Summerh., indigenous
- Eulophia barbata (Thunb.) Spreng., indigenous
- Eulophia calanthoides Schltr., endemic
- Eulophia chlorantha Schltr., indigenous
- Eulophia chrysops Summerh. accepted as Eulophia schweinfurthii Kraenzl.
- Eulophia clavicornis Lindl. accepted as Eulophia hians Spreng.
- Eulophia clitellifera (Rchb.f.) Bolus, indigenous
- Eulophia cochlearis Lindl., indigenous
- Eulophia coddii A.V.Hall, endemic
- Eulophia coeloglossa Schltr., indigenous
- Eulophia comosa Sond., indigenous
- Eulophia cooperi Rchb.f., endemic
- Eulophia cucullata (Afzel. ex Sw.) Steud., indigenous
- Eulophia ensata Lindl., indigenous
- Eulophia foliosa (Lindl.) Bolus, indigenous
- Eulophia fridericii (Rchb.f.) A.V.Hall, indigenous
- Eulophia hereroensis Schltr., indigenous
- Eulophia hians Spreng., indigenous
  - Eulophia hians Spreng. var. hians, indigenous
  - Eulophia hians Spreng. var. inaequalis (Schltr.) S.Thomas, indigenous
  - Eulophia hians Spreng. var. nutans (Sond.) S.Thomas, indigenous
- Eulophia holubii Rolfe
- Eulophia horsfallii (Bateman) Summerh., indigenous
- Eulophia huttonii Rolfe, indigenous
- Eulophia lamellata Lindl., indigenous
- Eulophia leachii Greatrex ex A.V.Hall, indigenous
- Eulophia leontoglossa Rchb.f., indigenous
- Eulophia litoralis Schltr., endemic
- Eulophia livingstoneana (Rchb.f.) Schltr., indigenous
- Eulophia longisepala Rendle, indigenous
- Eulophia lunata Schltr. accepted as Eulophia barbata (Thunb.) Spreng., indigenous
- Eulophia macowanii Rolfe, endemic
- Eulophia meleagris Rchb.f., endemic
- Eulophia micrantha Lindl., indigenous
- Eulophia milnei Rchb.f., indigenous
- Eulophia odontoglossa Rchb.f., indigenous
- Eulophia ovalis Lindl., indigenous
  - Eulophia ovalis Lindl. subsp. bainesii (Rolfe) A.V.Hall, accepted as Eulophia ovalis Lindl. var. bainesii (Rolfe) P.J.Cribb & la Croix, indigenous
  - Eulophia ovalis Lindl. var. bainesii (Rolfe) P.J.Cribb & la Croix, indigenous
  - Eulophia ovalis Lindl. var. ovalis, indigenous
- Eulophia parviflora (Lindl.) A.V.Hall, indigenous
- Eulophia parvilabris Lindl., indigenous
- Eulophia petersii (Rchb.f.) Rchb.f., indigenous
- Eulophia platypetala Lindl., endemic
- Eulophia rosea A.D.Hawkes, accepted as Eulophia horsfallii (Bateman) Summerh.
- Eulophia schweinfurthii Kraenzl., indigenous
- Eulophia speciosa (R.Br. ex Lindl.) Bolus, indigenous
- Eulophia sphaerocarpa Sond. accepted as Eulophia tristis (L.f.) Spreng., indigenous
- Eulophia streptopetala Lindl., indigenous
- Eulophia tabularis (L.f.) Bolus
- Eulophia tenella Rchb.f., indigenous
- Eulophia tristis (L.f.) Spreng., indigenous
- Eulophia tuberculata Bolus, indigenous
- Eulophia ustulata (Bolus) Bolus, indigenous
- Eulophia vinosa McMurtry & McDonald
- Eulophia walleri (Rchb.f.) Kraenzl.
- Eulophia welwitschii (Rchb.f.) Rolfe, accepted as Eulophia dichroma Rolfe, indigenous
- Eulophia zeyheriana Sond., indigenous

== Evotella ==
Genus Evotella:

- Evotella rubiginosa (Sond. ex Bolus) Kurzweil & H.P.Linder, endemic

== Gastrodia ==
Genus Gastrodia:

- Gastrodia sesamoides R.Br. not indigenous, invasive

== Graphorkis ==
Genus Graphorkis:

- Graphorkis ensata (Lindl.) Kuntze, accepted as Eulophia ensata Lindl., indigenous

== Habenaria ==
Genus Habenaria:

- Habenaria anguiceps Bolus, endemic
- Habenaria arenaria Lindl. indigenous
- Habenaria barbertoni Kraenzl. & Schltr. endemic
- Habenaria bicolor Conrath & Kraenzl. indigenous
- Habenaria chlorotica Rchb.f. accepted as Habenaria filicornis Lindl.
- Habenaria ciliosa Lindl. endemic
- Habenaria clavata (Lindl.) Rchb.f. indigenous
- Habenaria cornuta Lindl. indigenous
- Habenaria culveri Schltr. indigenous
- Habenaria dives Rchb.f. indigenous
- Habenaria dregeana Lindl. indigenous
- Habenaria epipactidea Rchb.f. indigenous
- Habenaria falcicornis (Burch. ex Lindl.) Bolus, indigenous
  - Habenaria falcicornis (Burch. ex Lindl.) Bolus subsp. caffra (Schltr.) J.C.Manning, indigenous
  - Habenaria falcicornis (Burch. ex Lindl.) Bolus subsp. falcicornis, indigenous
- Habenaria filicornis Lindl. indigenous
- Habenaria galpinii Bolus, indigenous
- Habenaria humilior Rchb.f. indigenous
- Habenaria kraenzliniana Schltr. endemic
- Habenaria laevigata Lindl. endemic
- Habenaria lithophila Schltr. indigenous
- Habenaria malacophylla Rchb.f. indigenous
- Habenaria mossii (G.Will.) J.C.Manning, endemic
- Habenaria nyikana Rchb.f. indigenous
  - Habenaria nyikana subsp. nyikana, indigenous
- Habenaria petitiana (A.Rich.) T.Durand & Schinz, indigenous
- Habenaria pseudociliosa Schelpe ex J.C.Manning, indigenous
- Habenaria rautaneniana Kraenzl. indigenous
- Habenaria schimperiana Hochst. ex A.Rich. indigenous
- Habenaria stenorhynchos Schltr. indigenous
- Habenaria transvaalensis Schltr. indigenous
- Habenaria tridens Lindl. indigenous
- Habenaria trilobulata Schltr. indigenous
- Habenaria tysonii Bolus, indigenous
- Habenaria woodii Schltr. endemic

== Herschelianthe ==
Genus Herschelianthe:

- Herschelianthe barbata (L.f.) N.C.Anthony, accepted as Disa barbata (L.f.) Sw.
- Herschelianthe baurii (Bolus) Rauschert, accepted as Disa baurii Bolus
- Herschelianthe forcipata (Schltr.) Rauschert, accepted as Disa forcipata Schltr.
- Herschelianthe forficaria (Bolus) N.C.Anthony, accepted as Disa forficaria Bolus
- Herschelianthe graminifolia (Ker Gawl. ex Spreng.) Rauschert, accepted as Disa graminifolia Ker Gawl. ex Spreng.
- Herschelianthe hians (L.f.) Rauschert, accepted as Disa hians (L.f.) Spreng.
- Herschelianthe lugens (Bolus) Rauschert, accepted as Disa lugens Bolus var. lugens
- Herschelianthe lugens (Bolus) Rauschert var. nigrescens (H.P.Linder) N.C.Anthony, accepted as Disa lugens Bolus var. nigrescens (H.P.Linder) H.P.Linder
- Herschelianthe multifida (Lindl.) Rauschert, accepted as Disa multifida Lindl.
- Herschelianthe newdigateae (L.Bolus) N.C.Anthony, accepted as Disa newdigateae L.Bolus
- Herschelianthe purpurascens (Bolus) Rauschert, accepted as Disa purpurascens Bolus
- Herschelianthe schlechteriana (Bolus) N.C.Anthony, accepted as Disa schlechteriana Bolus
- Herschelianthe spathulata (L.f.) Rauschert, accepted as Disa spathulata (L.f.) Sw.
  - Herschelianthe spathulata (L.f.) Rauschert subsp. spathulata, accepted as Disa spathulata (L.f.) Sw. subsp. spathulata
  - Herschelianthe spathulata subsp. tripartita (Lindl.) N.C.Anthony, accepted as Disa spathulata subsp. tripartita (Lindl.) H.P.Linder
- Herschelianthe venusta (Bolus) Rauschert, accepted as Disa venusta Bolus

== Holothrix ==
Genus Holothrix:

- Holothrix aspera (Lindl.) Rchb.f. endemic
- Holothrix brevipetala Immelman & Schelpe, endemic
- Holothrix burchellii (Lindl.) Rchb.f. endemic
- Holothrix cernua (Burm.f.) Schelpe, endemic
- Holothrix culveri Bolus, endemic
- Holothrix exilis Lindl. endemic
- Holothrix filicornis Immelman & Schelpe, indigenous
- Holothrix grandiflora (Sond.) Rchb.f. endemic
- Holothrix incurva Lindl. indigenous
- Holothrix longicornu G.J.Lewis, endemic
- Holothrix macowaniana Rchb.f. indigenous
- Holothrix majubensis C.Archer & R.H.Archer, endemic
- Holothrix micrantha Schltr. indigenous
- Holothrix mundii Sond. endemic
- Holothrix orthoceras (Harv.) Rchb.f. indigenous
- Holothrix parviflora (Lindl.) Rchb.f. endemic
- Holothrix pilosa (Burch. ex Lindl.) Rchb.f. endemic
- Holothrix randii Rendle, indigenous
- Holothrix schlechteriana Schltr. ex Kraenzl. endemic
- Holothrix scopularia (Lindl.) Rchb.f. indigenous
- Holothrix secunda (Thunb.) Rchb.f. endemic
- Holothrix thodei Rolfe, indigenous
- Holothrix villosa Lindl. indigenous
  - Holothrix villosa Lindl. var. condensata (Sond.) Immelman, endemic
  - Holothrix villosa Lindl. var. villosa, endemic

== Huttonaea ==
Genus Huttonaea:

- Huttonaea fimbriata (Harv.) Rchb.f. endemic
- Huttonaea grandiflora (Schltr.) Rolfe, indigenous
- Huttonaea oreophila Schltr. endemic
- Huttonaea pulchra Harv. endemic
- Huttonaea woodii Schltr. endemic

== Jumellea ==
Genus Jumellea:

- Jumellea filicornoides (De Wild.) Schltr. accepted as Jumellea walleri (Rolfe) la Croix
- Jumellea walleri (Rolfe) la Croix, indigenous

== Limodorum ==
Genus Limodorum:

- Limodorum barbatum Thunb. accepted as Acrolophia lunata (Schltr.) Schltr. & Bolus, indigenous
- Limodorum capense P.J.Bergius, accepted as Acrolophia capensis (P.J.Bergius) Fourc. indigenous
- Limodorum triste (L.f.) Thunb. accepted as Acrolophia capensis (P.J.Bergius) Fourc. indigenous

== Liparis ==
Genus Liparis:

- Liparis bowkeri Harv. indigenous
- Liparis capensis Lindl. endemic
- Liparis deistelii Schltr. indigenous
- Liparis odontochilos Summerh. accepted as Liparis deistelii Schltr.
- Liparis remota J.L.Stewart & Schelpe, indigenous

== Margelliantha ==
Genus Margelliantha:

- Margelliantha caffra (Bolus) P.J.Cribb & J.Stewart, endemic

== Microcoelia ==
Genus Microcoelia:

- Microcoelia aphylla (Thouars) Summerh. indigenous
- Microcoelia exilis Lindl. indigenous
- Microcoelia obovata Summerh. indigenous

== Monadenia ==
Genus Monadenia:

- Monadenia atrorubens (Schltr.) Rolfe, accepted as Disa atrorubens Schltr.
- Monadenia bolusiana (Schltr.) Rolfe, accepted as Disa bolusiana Schltr.
- Monadenia bracteata (Sw.) T.Durand & Schinz, accepted as Disa bracteata Sw.
- Monadenia brevicornis Lindl. accepted as Disa brevicornis (Lindl.) Bolus
- Monadenia cernua (Thunb.) T.Durand & Schinz, accepted as Disa cernua (Thunb.) Sw.
- Monadenia comosa Rchb.f. accepted as Disa comosa (Rchb.f.) Schltr.
- Monadenia conferta (Bolus) Kraenzl. accepted as Disa conferta Bolus
- Monadenia densiflora Lindl. accepted as Disa densiflora (Lindl.) Bolus
- Monadenia ecalcarata G.J.Lewis, accepted as Disa ecalcarata (G.J.Lewis) H.P.Linder
- Monadenia macrostachya Lindl. accepted as Disa macrostachya (Lindl.) Bolus
- Monadenia ophrydea Lindl. accepted as Disa ophrydea (Lindl.) Bolus
- Monadenia physodes (Sw.) Rchb.f. accepted as Disa physodes Sw.
- Monadenia pygmaea (Bolus) T.Durand & Schinz, accepted as Disa pygmaea Bolus
- Monadenia reticulata (Bolus) T.Durand & Schinz, accepted as Disa reticulata Bolus
- Monadenia rufescens (Thunb.) Lindl. accepted as Disa rufescens (Thunb.) Sw.
- Monadenia sabulosa (Bolus) Kraenzl. accepted as Disa sabulosa Bolus

== Mystacidium ==
Genus Mystacidium:

- Mystacidium aliceae Bolus, endemic
- Mystacidium brayboniae Summerh. endemic
- Mystacidium capense (L.f.) Schltr. indigenous
- Mystacidium flanaganii (Bolus) Bolus, endemic
- Mystacidium gracile Harv. indigenous
- Mystacidium pusillum Harv. endemic
- Mystacidium venosum Harv. ex Rolfe, indigenous

== Neobolusia ==
Genus Neobolusia:

- Neobolusia tysonii (Bolus) Schltr. indigenous
- Neobolusia virginea (Bolus) Schltr. accepted as Dracomonticola virginea (Bolus) H.P.Linder & Kurzweil

== Nervilia ==
Genus Nervilia:

- Nervilia bicarinata (Blume) Schltr. indigenous
- Nervilia crociformis (Zoll. & Moritzi) Seidenf. indigenous
- Nervilia gassneri Borge Pett. accepted as Nervilia lilacea Jum. & H.Perrier, indigenous
- Nervilia kotschyi (Rchb.f.) Schltr. indigenous
  - Nervilia kotschyi (Rchb.f.) Schltr. var. purpurata (Rchb.f. & Sond.) Borge Pett. indigenous
- Nervilia lilacea Jum. & H.Perrier, indigenous
- Nervilia renschiana (Rchb.f.) Schltr. indigenous

== Oberonia ==
Genus Oberonia:

- Oberonia disticha (Lam.) Schltr. indigenous

== Oeceoclades ==
Genus Oeceoclades:

- Oeceoclades decaryana (H.Perrier) Garay & P.Taylor, indigenous
- Oeceoclades lonchophylla (Rchb.f.) Garay & P.Taylor, indigenous
- Oeceoclades mackenii (Rolfe ex Hemsl.) Garay & P.Taylor, accepted as Oeceoclades maculata (Lindl.) Lindl. indigenous
- Oeceoclades maculata (Lindl.) Lindl. indigenous

== Orthochilus ==
Genus Orthochilus:

- Orthochilus aculeatus (L.f.) Bytebier, indigenous
  - Orthochilus aculeatus subsp. aculeatus, indigenous
  - Orthochilus aculeatus (L.f.) Bytebier subsp. huttonii (Rolfe) Bytebier, indigenous
- Orthochilus adenoglossus (Lindl.) Bytebier, indigenous
- Orthochilus chloranthus (Schltr.) Bytebier, indigenous
- Orthochilus ensatus (Lindl.) Bytebier, accepted as Eulophia ensata Lindl., indigenous
- Orthochilus foliosus (Lindl.) Bytebier, indigenous
- Orthochilus leontoglossus (Rchb.f.) Bytebier, indigenous
- Orthochilus litoralis (Schltr.) Bytebier, endemic
- Orthochilus odontoglossus (Rchb.f.) Bytebier, indigenous
- Orthochilus tabularis (L.f.) Bytebier, endemic
- Orthochilus vinosus (McMurtry & McDonald) Bytebier, endemic
- Orthochilus welwitschii Rchb.f. indigenous

== Pachites ==
Genus Pachites:

- Pachites appressa Lindl. endemic
- Pachites bodkinii Bolus, endemic

== Platycoryne ==
Genus Platycoryne:

- Platycoryne mediocris Summerh. indigenous

== Platylepis ==
Genus Platylepis:

- Platylepis glandulosa (Lindl.) Rchb.f. indigenous

== Polystachya ==
Genus Polystachya:

- Polystachya albescens Ridl. indigenous
  - Polystachya albescens Ridl. subsp. imbricata (Rolfe) Summerh. indigenous
- Polystachya concreta (Jacq.) Garay & Sweet, indigenous
- Polystachya cultriformis (Thouars) Spreng. indigenous
- Polystachya fusiformis (Thouars) Lindl. indigenous
- Polystachya mauritiana Spreng. indigenous
- Polystachya modesta Rchb.f. indigenous
- Polystachya ngomensis G.J.McDonald & McMurtry, indigenous
- Polystachya ottoniana Rchb.f. indigenous
- Polystachya pubescens (Lindl.) Rchb.f. indigenous
- Polystachya sandersonii Harv. indigenous
- Polystachya tessellata Lindl. accepted as Polystachya mauritiana Spreng.
- Polystachya transvaalensis Schltr. indigenous
- Polystachya zambesiaca Rolfe, indigenous
- Polystachya zuluensis L.Bolus, indigenous

== Pterygodium ==
Genus Pterygodium:

- Pterygodium acutifolium Lindl. endemic
- Pterygodium alatum (Thunb.) Sw. endemic
- Pterygodium bicolorum (Thunb.) Schltr. endemic
- Pterygodium bifidum (Sond.) Schltr. endemic
- Pterygodium caffrum (L.) Sw. endemic
- Pterygodium catholicum (L.) Sw. endemic
- Pterygodium cleistogamum (Bolus) Schltr. endemic
- Pterygodium connivens Schelpe, endemic
- Pterygodium cooperi Rolfe, indigenous
- Pterygodium crispum (Thunb.) Schltr. endemic
- Pterygodium cruciferum Sond. endemic
- Pterygodium deflexum Bolus, endemic
- Pterygodium excisum (Lindl.) Schltr. endemic
- Pterygodium flanaganii Bolus, indigenous
- Pterygodium hallii (Schelpe) Kurzweil & H.P.Linder, endemic
- Pterygodium hastatum Bolus, indigenous
- Pterygodium inversum (Thunb.) Sw. endemic
- Pterygodium leucanthum Bolus, indigenous
- Pterygodium magnum Rchb.f. indigenous
- Pterygodium microglossum (Lindl.) Schltr. endemic
- Pterygodium newdigateae Bolus, endemic
  - Pterygodium newdigateae Bolus var. cleistogamum Bolus, accepted as Pterygodium cleistogamum (Bolus) Schltr.
- Pterygodium nigrescens (Sond.) Schltr. indigenous
- Pterygodium orobanchoides (L.f.) Schltr. endemic
- Pterygodium pentherianum Schltr. endemic
- Pterygodium platypetalum Lindl. endemic
- Pterygodium schelpei H.P.Linder, endemic
- Pterygodium tricuspidatum (Bolus) Schltr. indigenous
- Pterygodium vermiferum E.G.H.Oliv. & Liltved, endemic
- Pterygodium volucris (L.f.) Sw. endemic

== Rangaeris ==
Genus Rangaeris:

- Rangaeris muscicola (Rchb.f.) Summerh. indigenous

== Rhipidoglossum ==
Genus Rhipidoglossum:

- Rhipidoglossum xanthopollinium (Rchb.f.) Schltr. indigenous

== Saccolabium ==
Genus Saccolabium:

- Saccolabium pachyglossa (Rchb.f.) Rolfe, accepted as Acampe pachyglossa Rchb.f. indigenous

== Satyridium ==
Genus Satyridium:

- Satyridium rostratum Lindl. accepted as Satyrium rhynchanthum Bolus

== Satyrium ==
Genus Satyrium:

- Satyrium aculeatum L.f. accepted as Orthochilus aculeatus (L.f.) Bytebier, indigenous
- Satyrium acuminatum Lindl. endemic
- Satyrium bicallosum Thunb. endemic
- Satyrium bicorne (L.) Thunb. endemic
- Satyrium bracteatum (L.f.) Thunb. endemic
- Satyrium candidum Lindl. endemic
- Satyrium capense (P.J.Bergius) Houtt. accepted as Acrolophia capensis (P.J.Bergius) Fourc. indigenous
- Satyrium carneum (Dryand.) Sims, endemic
- Satyrium coriifolium Sw. endemic
- Satyrium cristatum Sond. indigenous
  - Satyrium cristatum Sond. var. cristatum, indigenous
  - Satyrium cristatum Sond. var. longilabiatum A.V.Hall, indigenous
- Satyrium emarcidum Bolus, endemic
- Satyrium erectum Sw. endemic
- Satyrium eurycalcaratum Niet, endemic
- Satyrium excelsum Thunb. accepted as Disa tripetaloides (L.f.) N.E.Br.
- Satyrium foliosum Sw. endemic
- Satyrium hallackii Bolus, indigenous
  - Satyrium hallackii Bolus subsp. hallackii, endemic
  - Satyrium hallackii Bolus subsp. ocellatum (Bolus) A.V.Hall, indigenous
- Satyrium hians L.f. accepted as Disa hians (L.f.) Spreng.
- Satyrium humile Lindl. endemic
- Satyrium ligulatum Lindl. endemic
- Satyrium liltvedianum Niet, endemic
- Satyrium longicauda Lindl. indigenous
  - Satyrium longicauda Lindl. var. jacottetianum (Kraenzl.) A.V.Hall, indigenous
  - Satyrium longicauda Lindl. var. longicauda, indigenous
- Satyrium longicolle Lindl. endemic
- Satyrium lupulinum Lindl. endemic
- Satyrium macrophyllum Lindl. indigenous
- Satyrium membranaceum Sw. endemic
- Satyrium microrrhynchum Schltr. indigenous
- Satyrium muticum Lindl. endemic
- Satyrium neglectum Schltr. indigenous
  - Satyrium neglectum Schltr. subsp. neglectum, indigenous
  - Satyrium neglectum Schltr. subsp. neglectum var. neglectum, indigenous
  - Satyrium neglectum Schltr. subsp. woodii (Schltr.) A.V.Hall, indigenous
- Satyrium odorum Sond. endemic
- Satyrium outeniquense Schltr. endemic
- Satyrium pallens S.D.Johnson & Kurzweil, endemic
- Satyrium parviflorum Sw. indigenous
- Satyrium princeps Bolus, endemic
- Satyrium pulchrum S.D.Johnson & Kurzweil, endemic
- Satyrium pumilum Thunb. endemic
- Satyrium pygmaeum Sond. endemic
- Satyrium retusum Lindl. endemic
- Satyrium rhodanthum Schltr. endemic
- Satyrium rhynchanthum Bolus, endemic
- Satyrium rupestre Schltr. ex Bolus, endemic
- Satyrium situsanguinum Niet & Liltved, endemic
- Satyrium sphaerocarpum Lindl. indigenous
- Satyrium stenopetalum Lindl. indigenous
  - Satyrium stenopetalum Lindl. subsp. brevicalcaratum (Bolus) A.V.Hall, endemic
  - Satyrium stenopetalum Lindl. subsp. stenopetalum, endemic
- Satyrium striatum Thunb. endemic
- Satyrium trinerve Lindl. indigenous
- Satyrium triste L.f. accepted as Acrolophia capensis (P.J.Bergius) Fourc. indigenous
- Satyrium x guthriei Bolus, endemic

== Schizochilus ==
Genus Schizochilus:

- Schizochilus angustifolius Rolfe, endemic
- Schizochilus bulbinella (Rchb.f.) Bolus, indigenous
- Schizochilus cecilii Rolfe, indigenous
  - Schizochilus cecilii Rolfe subsp. culveri (Schltr.) H.P.Linder, indigenous
  - Schizochilus cecilii Rolfe subsp. transvaalensis (Rolfe) H.P.Linder, endemic
- Schizochilus crenulatus H.P.Linder, endemic
- Schizochilus flexuosus Harv. ex Rolfe, endemic
- Schizochilus gerrardii (Rchb.f.) Bolus, endemic
- Schizochilus lilacinus Schelpe ex H.P.Linder, endemic
- Schizochilus zeyheri Sond. indigenous

== Schizodium ==
Genus Schizodium:

- Schizodium bifidum (Thunb.) Rchb.f. accepted as Disa bifida (Thunb.) Sw. endemic
- Schizodium cornutum (L.) Schltr. accepted as Disa biflora (L.) Druce
- Schizodium flexuosum (L.) Lindl. accepted as Disa flexuosa (L.) Sw. endemic
- Schizodium inflexum Lindl. accepted as Disa inflexa (Lindl.) Bolus, endemic
- Schizodium longipetalum Lindl. accepted as Disa longipetala (Lindl.) Bolus, endemic
- Schizodium obliquum Lindl., accepted as Disa obliqua, indigenous
  - Schizodium obliquum Lindl. subsp. clavigerum (Lindl.) H.P.Linder, accepted as Disa obliqua (Lindl.) Bolus subsp. clavigera (Lindl.) Bytebier, endemic
  - Schizodium obliquum Lindl. subsp. obliquum, accepted as Disa obliqua (Lindl.) Bolus subsp. obliqua, endemic
- Schizodium satyrioides (L.) Garay, accepted as Disa biflora (L.) Druce, endemic

== Serapia ==
Genus Serapia:

- Serapia capensis L. accepted as Acrolophia lunata (Schltr.) Schltr. & Bolus, indigenous

== Serapias ==
Genus Serapias:

- Serapias aculeata (L.f.) Thunb. accepted as Orthochilus aculeatus (L.f.) Bytebier, indigenous

== Solenangis ==
Genus Solenangis:

- Solenangis aphylla (Thouars) Summerh. accepted as Microcoelia aphylla (Thouars) Summerh. indigenous

== Stenoglottis ==
Genus Stenoglottis:

- Stenoglottis fimbriata Lindl. indigenous
  - Stenoglottis fimbriata Lindl. subsp. fimbriata, indigenous
  - Stenoglottis fimbriata Lindl. subsp. saxicola (Schltr. ex Kraenzl.) G.J.McDonald, indigenous
- Stenoglottis inandensis G.J.McDonald & D.G.A.Styles, endemic
- Stenoglottis longifolia Hook.f. endemic
- Stenoglottis macloughlinii (L.Bolus) G.J.McDonald ex J.M.H.Shaw, indigenous
- Stenoglottis modestus Truter & K.G.Joliffe, indigenous
- Stenoglottis molweniensis G.J.McDonald ex J.M.H.Shaw, endemic
- Stenoglottis woodii Schltr. indigenous
- Stenoglottis zambesiaca Rolfe, indigenous

== Tridactyle ==
Genus Tridactyle:

- Tridactyle bicaudata (Lindl.) Schltr. indigenous
  - Tridactyle bicaudata (Lindl.) Schltr. subsp. bicaudata, indigenous
  - Tridactyle bicaudata (Lindl.) Schltr. subsp. rupestris H.P.Linder, endemic
- Tridactyle gentilii (De Wild.) Schltr. indigenous
- Tridactyle tricuspis (Bolus) Schltr. indigenous
- Tridactyle tridentata (Harv.) Schltr. indigenous

== Vanilla ==
Genus Vanilla:

- Vanilla roscheri Rchb.f. indigenous

== Hybrids ==
- X Herscheliodisa vogelpoelii H.P.Linder, accepted as Disa hybrid

== Ypsilopus ==
Genus Ypsilopus:

- Ypsilopus erectus (P.J.Cribb) P.J.Cribb & J.L.Stewart, indigenous

== Zeuxine ==
Genus Zeuxine:

- Zeuxine africana Rchb.f. indigenous
