= Acampe pachyglossa =

Scientific classification
- Kingdom: Plantae
- Clade: Tracheophytes
- Clade: Angiosperms
- Clade: Monocots
- Order: Asparagales
- Family: Orchidaceae
- Subfamily: Epidendroideae
- Genus: Acampe
- Species: A. pachyglossa

Binomial name
- Acampe pachyglossa Rchb.f.

Synonyms
- Acampe madagascariensis Kraenzl.; Acampe mombasensis Rendle; Acampe nyassana Schltr.; Acampe pachyglossa subsp. reschiana (Rchb.f.) Senghas; Acampe renschiana Rchb.f.; Saccolabium mombasense (Rendle) Rolfe; Saccolabium pachyglossum (Rchb.f.) Rolfe, nom. illeg. homonym. post.

Orchid species

Acampe pachyglossa is an orchid in the Epidendroideae subfamily. It is an epiphytic subshrub native to tropical Africa, ranging from southern Somalia to northeastern KwaZulu-Natal along Africa's east coast, and westward to Democratic Republic of the Congo, Angola, Zambia, and Zimbabwe. It is also native to Madagascar, the Comoros, the Seychelles and Aldabra, Mauritius, and Réunion in the western Indian Ocean.

The species was described by Heinrich Gustav Reichenbach in 1881.
