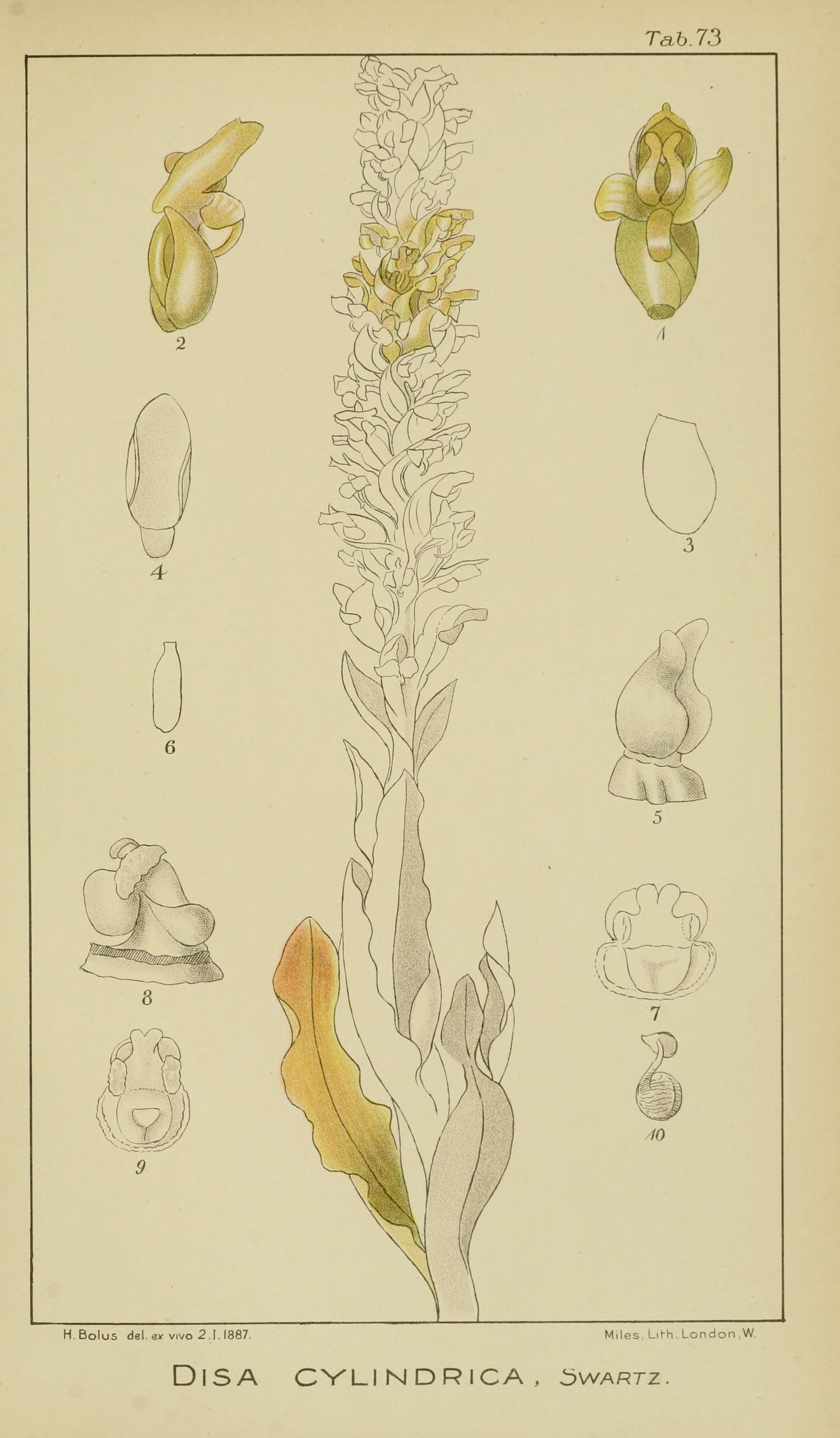

Scientific classification
- Kingdom: Plantae
- Clade: Tracheophytes
- Clade: Angiosperms
- Clade: Monocots
- Order: Asparagales
- Family: Orchidaceae
- Subfamily: Orchidoideae
- Genus: Disa
- Species: D. cylindrica

Binomial name
- Disa cylindrica (Thunb.) Sw.

Synonyms
- Disa bracteata Lindl.; Monadenia cylindrica (Thunb.) Szlach.; Satyrium cylindricum Thunb.

= Disa cylindrica =

Species of flowering plant

Disa cylindrica is a perennial plant and geophyte that belongs to the genus Disa and is part of the fynbos. The plant is endemic to the Eastern Cape and Western Cape.
