= Disa rhodantha =

Scientific classification
- Kingdom: Plantae
- Clade: Tracheophytes
- Clade: Angiosperms
- Clade: Monocots
- Order: Asparagales
- Family: Orchidaceae
- Subfamily: Orchidoideae
- Genus: Disa
- Species: D. rhodantha

Binomial name
- Disa rhodantha Schltr.

Species of flowering plant

Disa rhodantha is a perennial plant and geophyte belonging to the genus Disa and part of the fynbos. The plant is native to KwaZulu-Natal, Limpopo, Mpumalanga and Zimbabwe.
