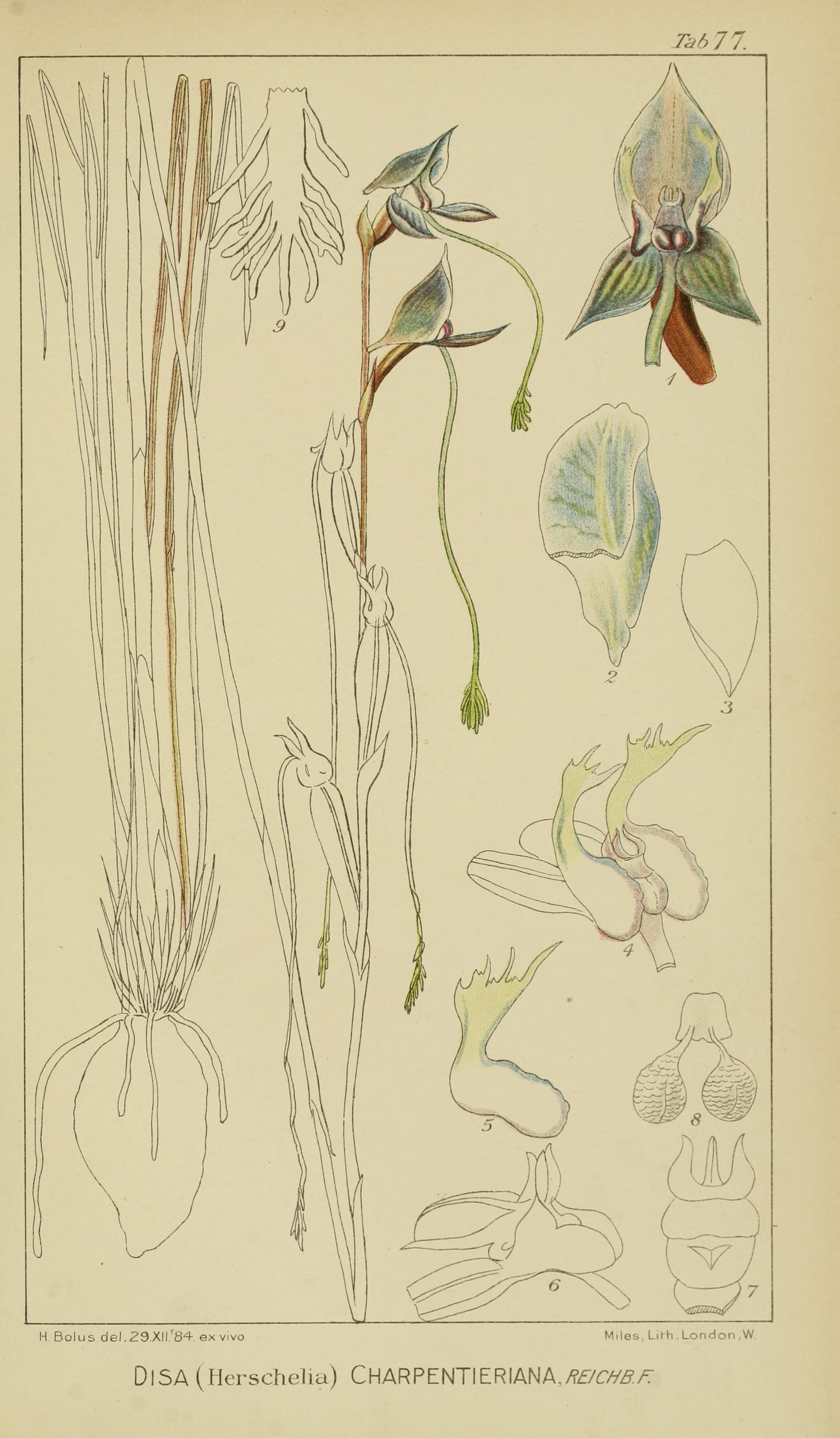

Scientific classification
- Kingdom: Plantae
- Clade: Tracheophytes
- Clade: Angiosperms
- Clade: Monocots
- Order: Asparagales
- Family: Orchidaceae
- Subfamily: Orchidoideae
- Genus: Disa
- Species: D. multifida

Binomial name
- Disa multifida Lindl., (1838)

Synonyms
- Disa charpentieriana Rchb.f.; Herschelia charpentieriana (Rchb.f.) Kraenzl.; Herschelia multifida (Lindl.) Rolfe; Herschelianthe charpentieriana (Rchb.f.) Rauschert; Herschelianthe multifida (Lindl.) Rauschert

= Disa multifida =

Species of flowering plant

Disa multifida is a perennial plant and geophyte belonging to the genus Disa and is part of the fynbos. The plant is endemic to the Western Cape.
