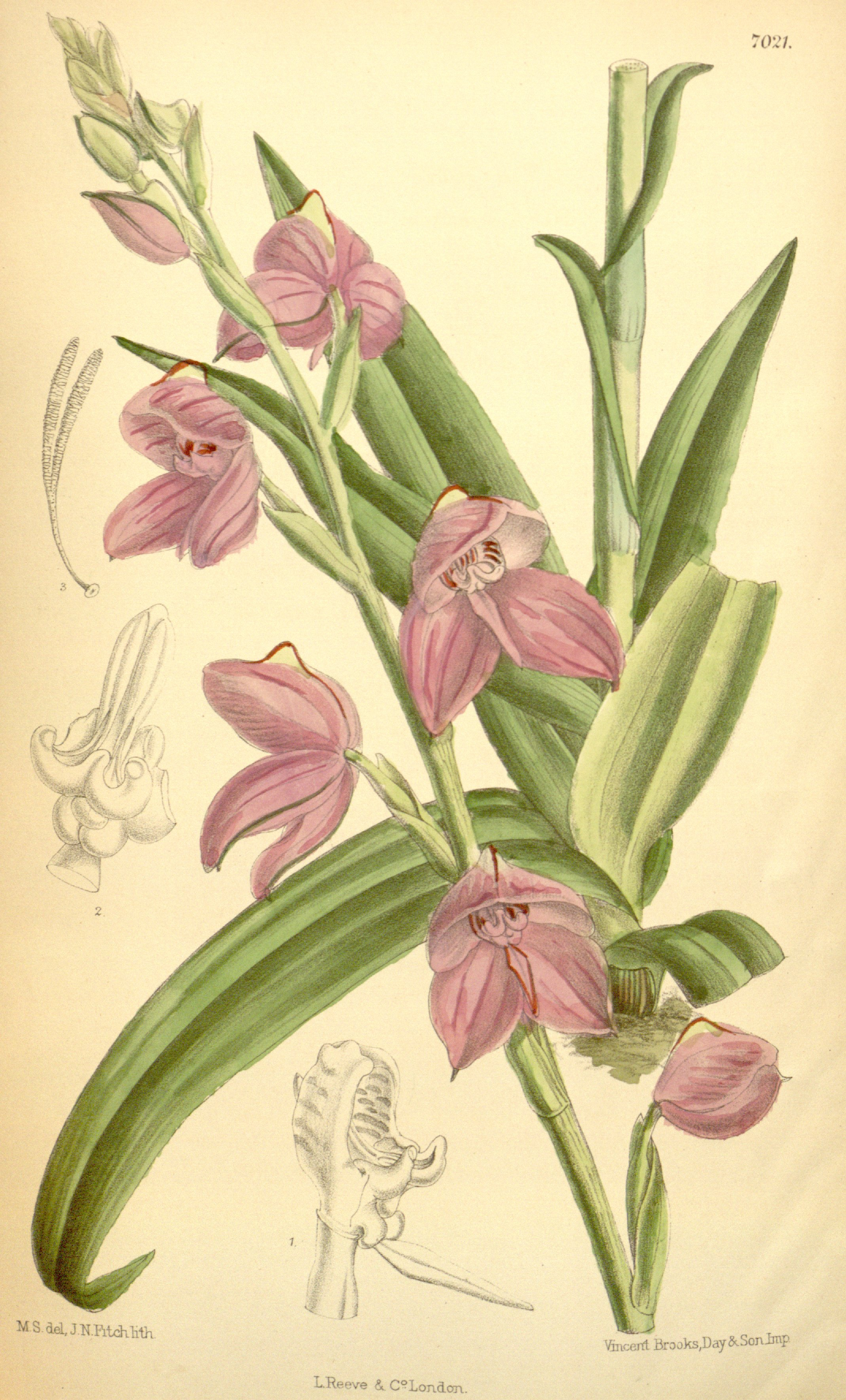

Scientific classification
- Kingdom: Plantae
- Clade: Tracheophytes
- Clade: Angiosperms
- Clade: Monocots
- Order: Asparagales
- Family: Orchidaceae
- Subfamily: Orchidoideae
- Genus: Disa
- Species: D. racemosa

Binomial name
- Disa racemosa L.f.

Synonyms
- Disa secunda (Thunb.) Sw.; Satyrium secundum Thunb.

= Disa racemosa =

Species of flowering plant

Disa racemosa, the vlei disa or rose disa, is a perennial plant and geophyte belonging to the genus Disa and is part of the fynbos. The plant is endemic to the Eastern Cape and Western Cape. The species grows to a height of 1 m and flowers in November and December, usually just after it has burned.
