= Disa triloba =

Scientific classification
- Kingdom: Plantae
- Clade: Tracheophytes
- Clade: Angiosperms
- Clade: Monocots
- Order: Asparagales
- Family: Orchidaceae
- Subfamily: Orchidoideae
- Genus: Disa
- Species: D. triloba

Binomial name
- Disa triloba Lindl.

Synonyms
- Disa sagittalis var. triloba (Lindl.) Schltr.

Species of flowering plant

Disa triloba, commonly known as the three-lobed disa, is a perennial plant and geophyte belonging to the genus Disa. The plant is endemic to the Western Cape and is part of the fynbos.
