= Disa dracomontana =

Scientific classification
- Kingdom: Plantae
- Clade: Tracheophytes
- Clade: Angiosperms
- Clade: Monocots
- Order: Asparagales
- Family: Orchidaceae
- Subfamily: Orchidoideae
- Genus: Disa
- Species: D. dracomontana

Binomial name
- Disa dracomontana Schelpe ex H.P.Linder

Species of flowering plant

Disa dracomontana, commonly known as the Drakensberg disa, is a perennial plant and geophyte belonging to the genus Disa. The plant is endemic to KwaZulu-Natal and the Free State and occurs in the Drakensberg.
