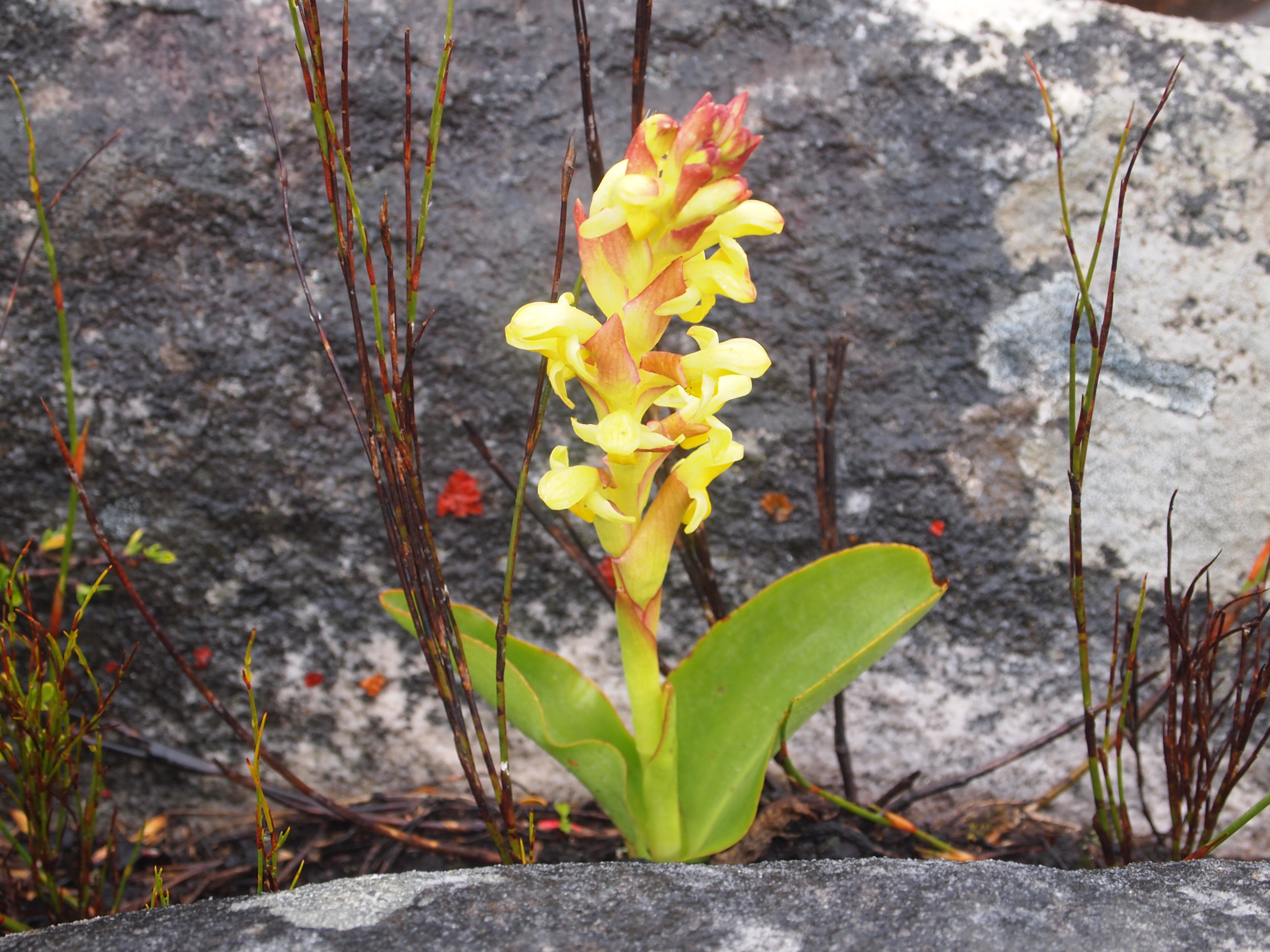

Scientific classification
- Kingdom: Plantae
- Clade: Tracheophytes
- Clade: Angiosperms
- Clade: Monocots
- Order: Asparagales
- Family: Orchidaceae
- Subfamily: Orchidoideae
- Genus: Disa
- Species: D. comosa

Binomial name
- Disa comosa (Rchb.f.) Schltr.

Synonyms
- Disa affinis N.E.Br.; Monadenia comosa Rchb.f.

= Disa comosa =

Species of flowering plant

Disa comosa is a perennial plant and geophyte belonging to the genus Disa and is part of the fynbos. The plant is endemic to the Eastern Cape and the Western Cape. The plant has no threats.
