= Disa sankeyi =

Scientific classification
- Kingdom: Plantae
- Clade: Embryophytes
- Clade: Tracheophytes
- Clade: Angiosperms
- Clade: Monocots
- Order: Asparagales
- Family: Orchidaceae
- Subfamily: Orchidoideae
- Genus: Disa
- Species: D. sankeyi

Binomial name
- Disa sankeyi Rolfe

Synonyms
- Disa basutorum Kraenzl.

Species of flowering plant

Disa sankeyi, commonly known as Sankey's disa, is a perennial plant and geophyte belonging to the genus Disa. The plant is native to Eswatini, KwaZulu-Natal, Lesotho, the Free State, and the Eastern Cape and occurs in the Drakensberg at altitudes of 2400–3000 m. The population in the Eastern Cape is threatened by crop cultivation, plantations and overgrazing. The population in KwaZulu-Natal is not threatened.
