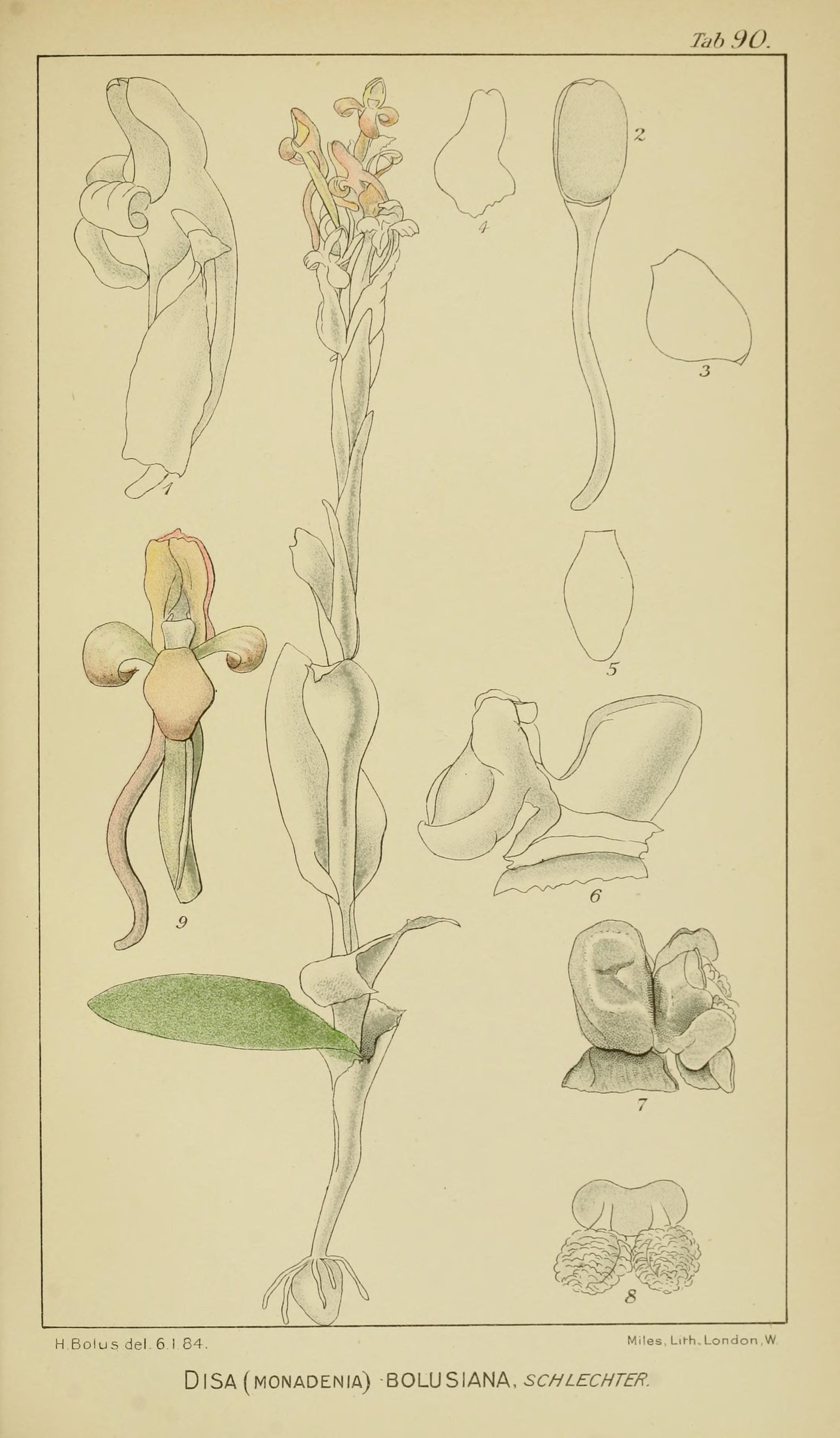

Scientific classification
- Kingdom: Plantae
- Clade: Tracheophytes
- Clade: Angiosperms
- Clade: Monocots
- Order: Asparagales
- Family: Orchidaceae
- Subfamily: Orchidoideae
- Genus: Disa
- Species: D. bolusiana

Binomial name
- Disa bolusiana Schltr.

Synonyms
- Monadenia bolusiana (Schltr.) Rolfe

= Disa bolusiana =

Species of flowering plant

Disa bolusiana is a perennial plant and geophyte belonging to the genus Disa and is part of the fynbos. The plant is endemic to the Western Cape.
