= Disa perplexa =

Scientific classification
- Kingdom: Plantae
- Clade: Tracheophytes
- Clade: Angiosperms
- Clade: Monocots
- Order: Asparagales
- Family: Orchidaceae
- Subfamily: Orchidoideae
- Genus: Disa
- Species: D. perplexa

Binomial name
- Disa perplexa H.P.Linder

Species of flowering plant

Disa perplexa is a perennial plant and geophyte belonging to the genus Disa. The plant is native to Kenya, Malawi, Nigeria, South Africa, Tanzania, Zambia and Zimbabwe.
