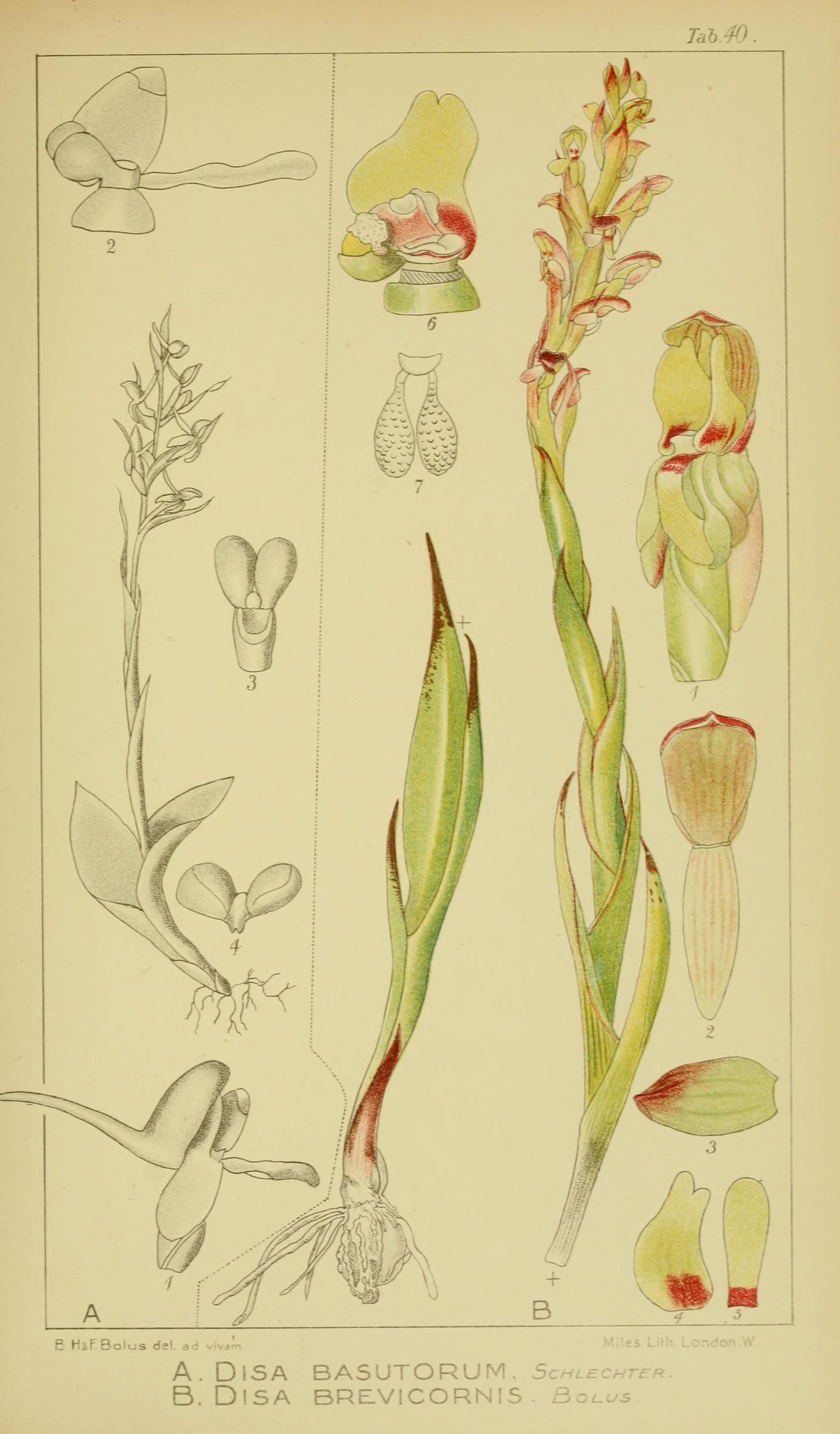

Scientific classification
- Kingdom: Plantae
- Clade: Tracheophytes
- Clade: Angiosperms
- Clade: Monocots
- Order: Asparagales
- Family: Orchidaceae
- Subfamily: Orchidoideae
- Genus: Disa
- Species: D. basutorum

Binomial name
- Disa basutorum Schltr.

Synonyms
- Monadenia basutorum (Schltr.) Rolfe

= Disa basutorum =

Species of flowering plant

Disa basutorum, the Basuto disa, is a perennial plant and geophyte belonging to the genus Disa. The species is native to KwaZulu-Natal and Lesotho.
