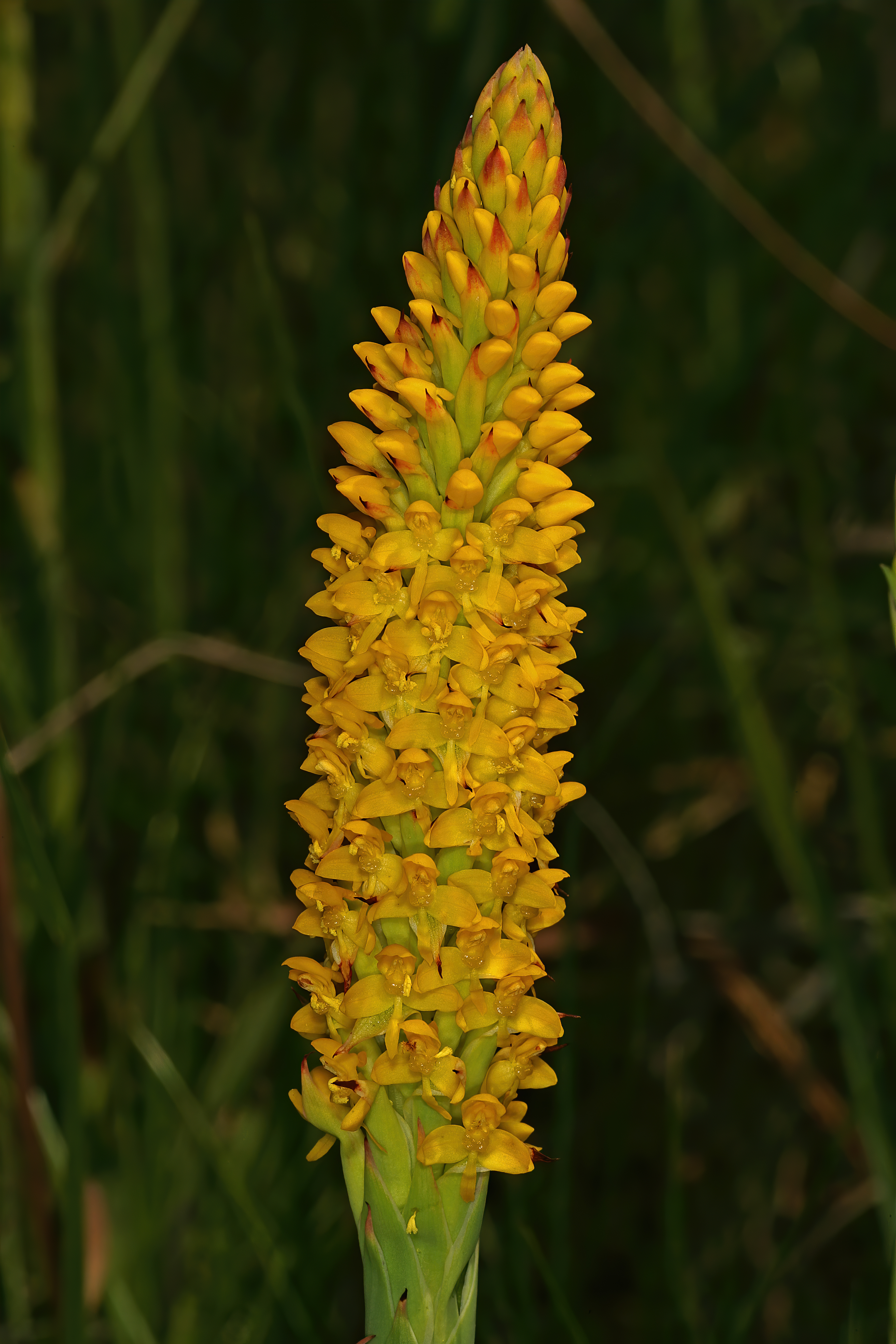

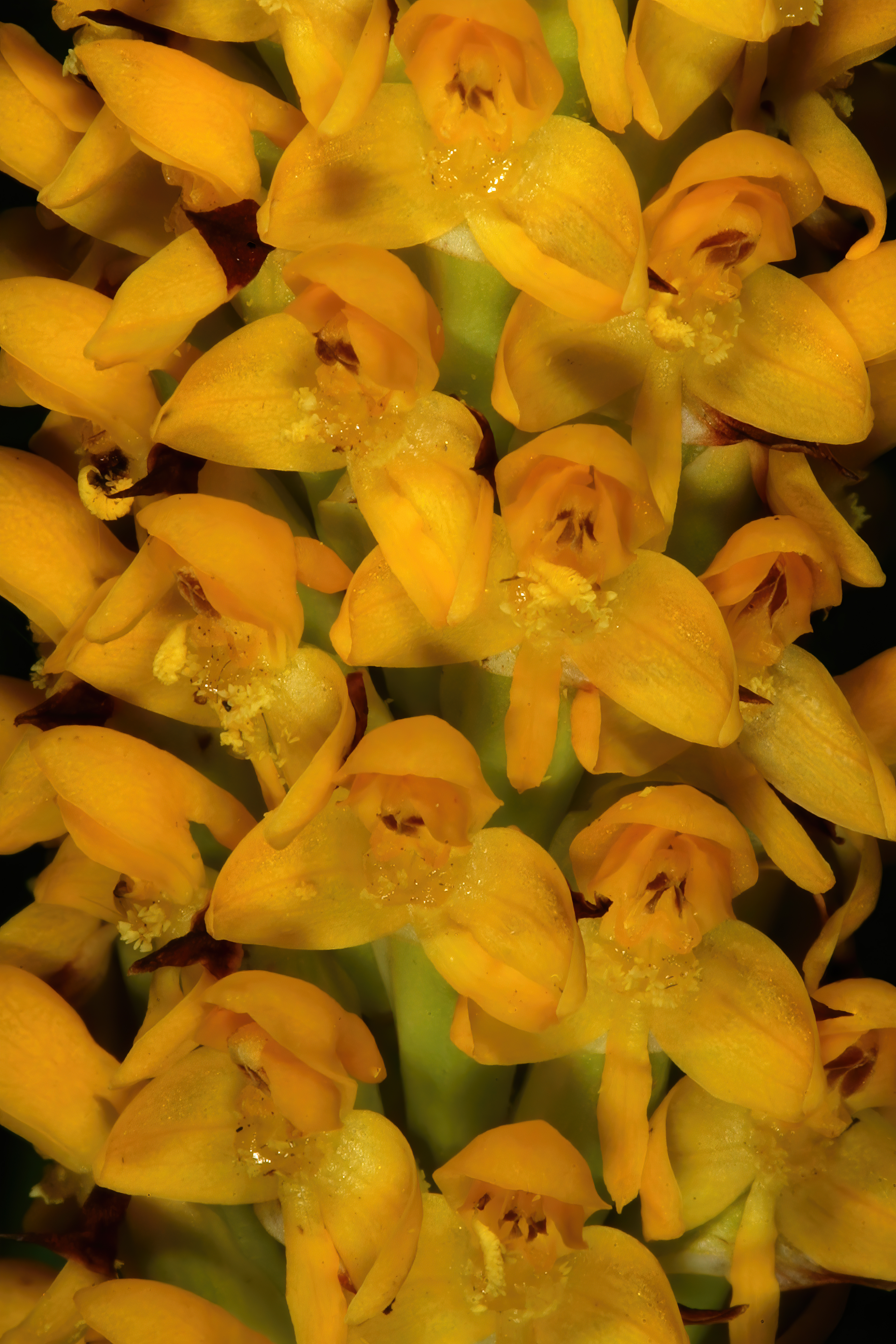

Scientific classification
- Kingdom: Plantae
- Clade: Tracheophytes
- Clade: Angiosperms
- Clade: Monocots
- Order: Asparagales
- Family: Orchidaceae
- Subfamily: Orchidoideae
- Genus: Disa
- Species: D. woodii

Binomial name
- Disa woodii Schltr.

= Disa woodii =

Species of flowering plant

Disa woodii is a perennial plant and geophyte belonging to the genus Disa. In South Africa, the plant is native to Gauteng, KwaZulu-Natal, Limpopo, Mpumalanga and the Eastern Cape. Outside South Africa, the plant is native to Eswatini, Mozambique and Zimbabwe.
