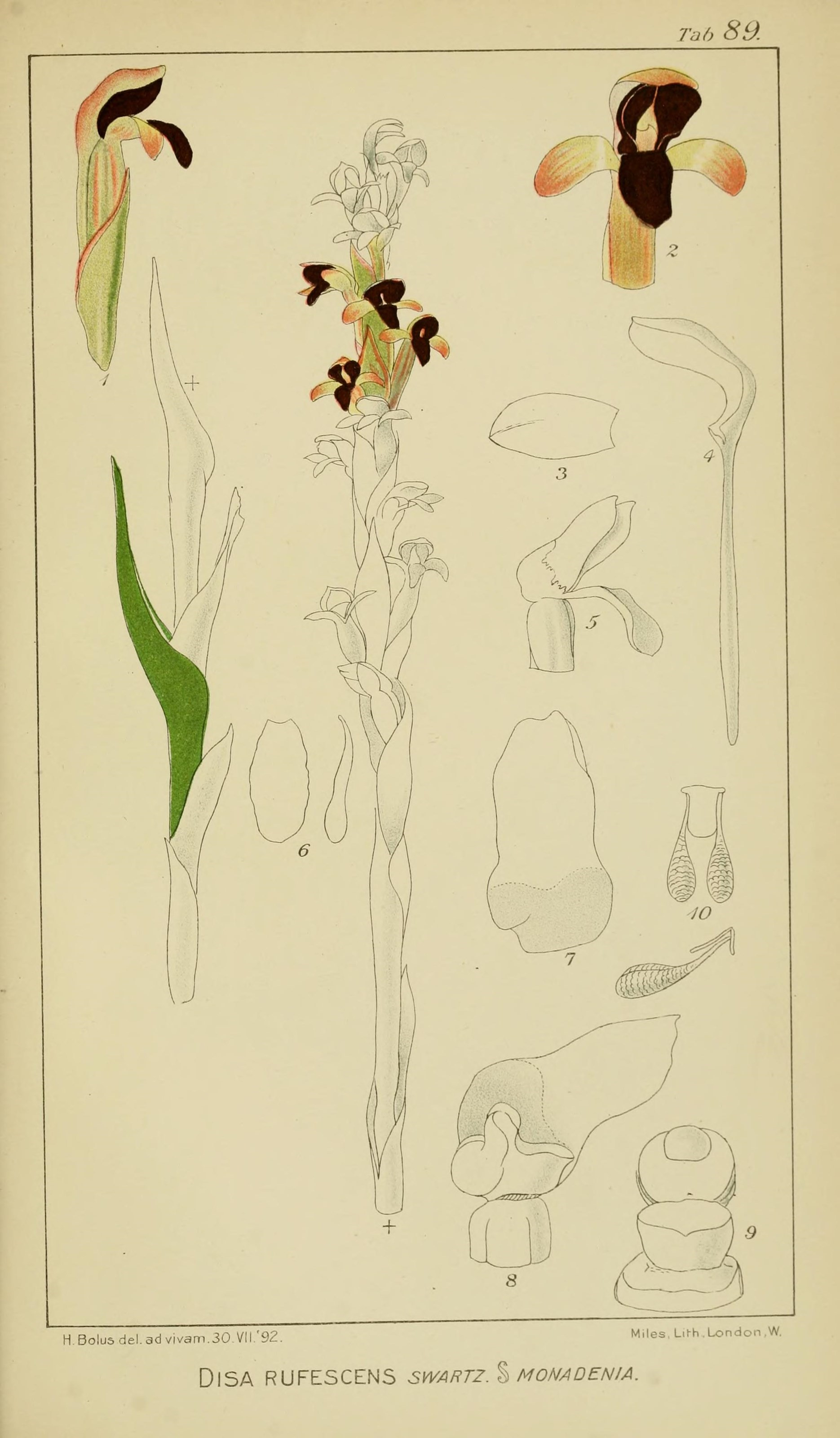

Scientific classification
- Kingdom: Plantae
- Clade: Tracheophytes
- Clade: Angiosperms
- Clade: Monocots
- Order: Asparagales
- Family: Orchidaceae
- Subfamily: Orchidoideae
- Genus: Disa
- Species: D. rufescens

Binomial name
- Disa rufescens (Thunb.) Sw.

Synonyms
- Monadenia lancifolia Sond.; Monadenia leptostachys Sond.; Monadenia macrocera Lindl.; Monadenia rufescens (Thunb.) Lindl.; Satyrium rufescens Thunb.

= Disa rufescens =

Species of flowering plant

Disa rufescens is a perennial plant and geophyte belonging to the genus Disa. The plant is endemic to the Western Cape.
