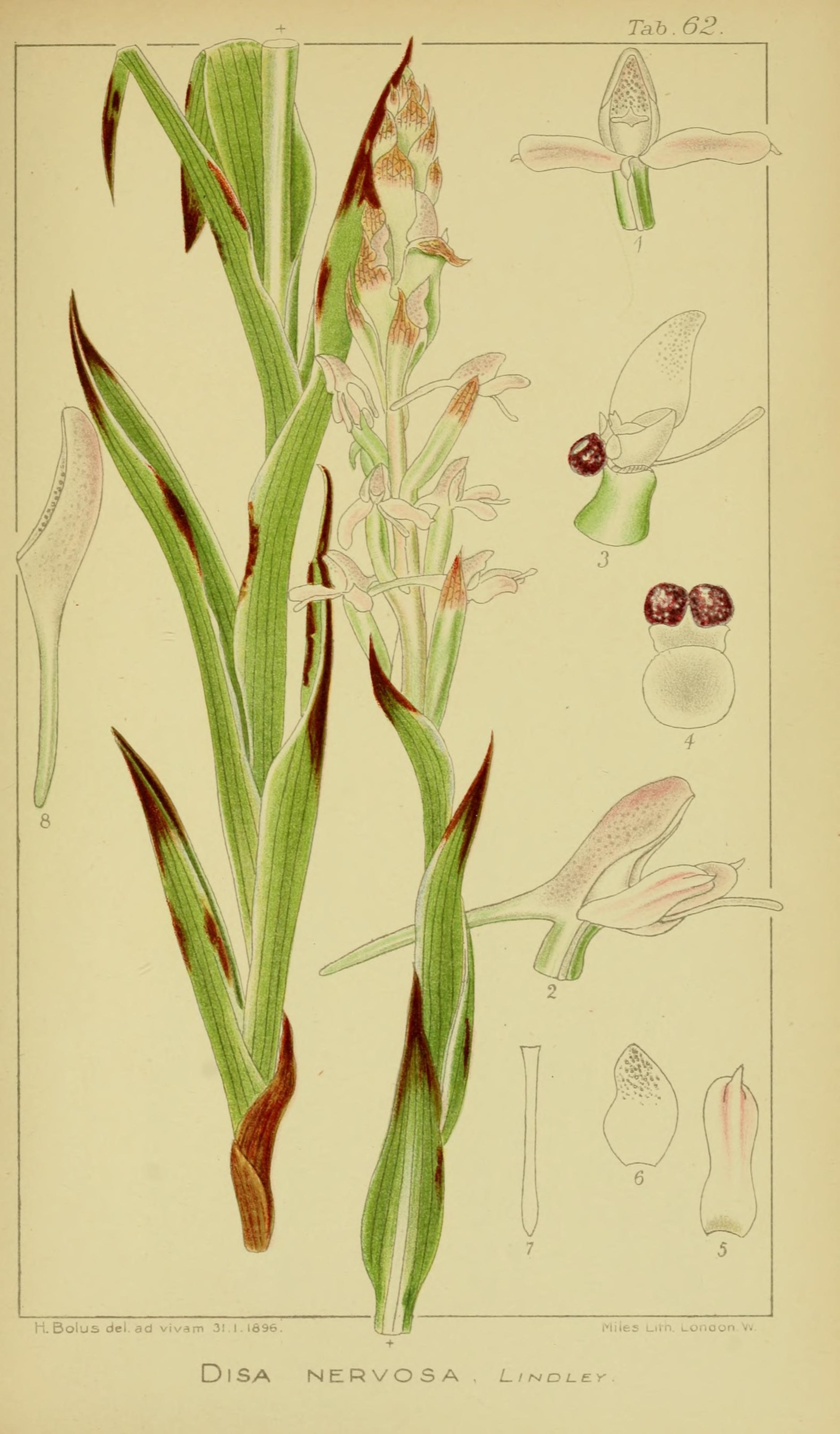

Scientific classification
- Kingdom: Plantae
- Clade: Tracheophytes
- Clade: Angiosperms
- Clade: Monocots
- Order: Asparagales
- Family: Orchidaceae
- Subfamily: Orchidoideae
- Genus: Disa
- Species: D. nervosa

Binomial name
- Disa nervosa Lindl.

Synonyms
- Disa fanniniae Harv. ex Rolfe

= Disa nervosa =

Species of flowering plant

Disa nervosa is a perennial plant and geophyte belonging to the genus Disa. The plant is native to Eswatini, KwaZulu-Natal, Eastern Cape and Mpumalanga.
