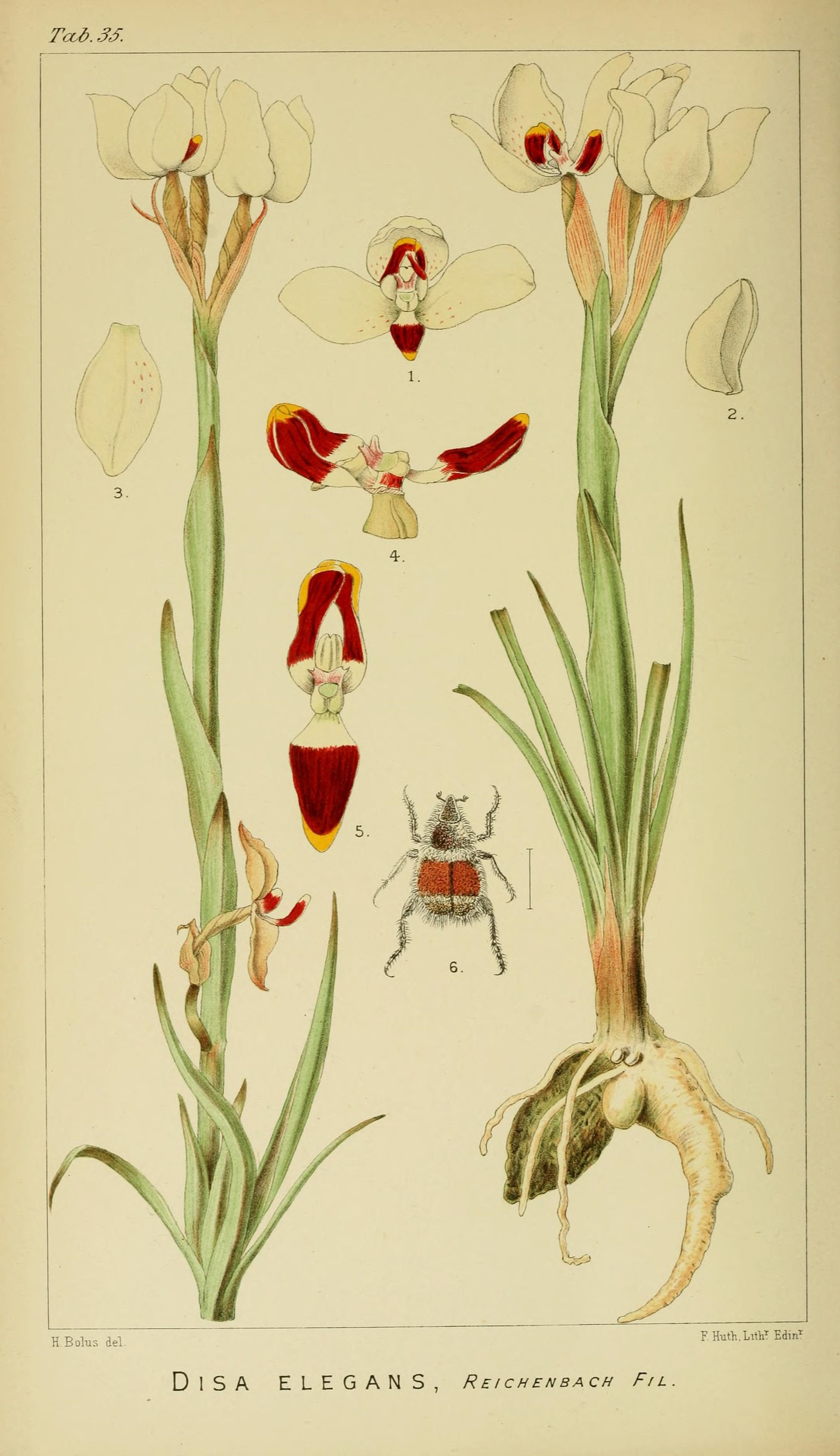

Scientific classification
- Kingdom: Plantae
- Clade: Tracheophytes
- Clade: Angiosperms
- Clade: Monocots
- Order: Asparagales
- Family: Orchidaceae
- Subfamily: Orchidoideae
- Genus: Disa
- Species: D. elegans

Binomial name
- Disa elegans Sond. ex Rchb.f.

Synonyms
- Orthopenthea elegans (Sond. ex Rchb.f.) Rolfe

= Disa elegans =

Species of flowering plant

Disa elegans, the chink disa, is a perennial plant and geophyte belonging to the genus Disa. The plant is endemic to the Western Cape and is part of the fynbos.
