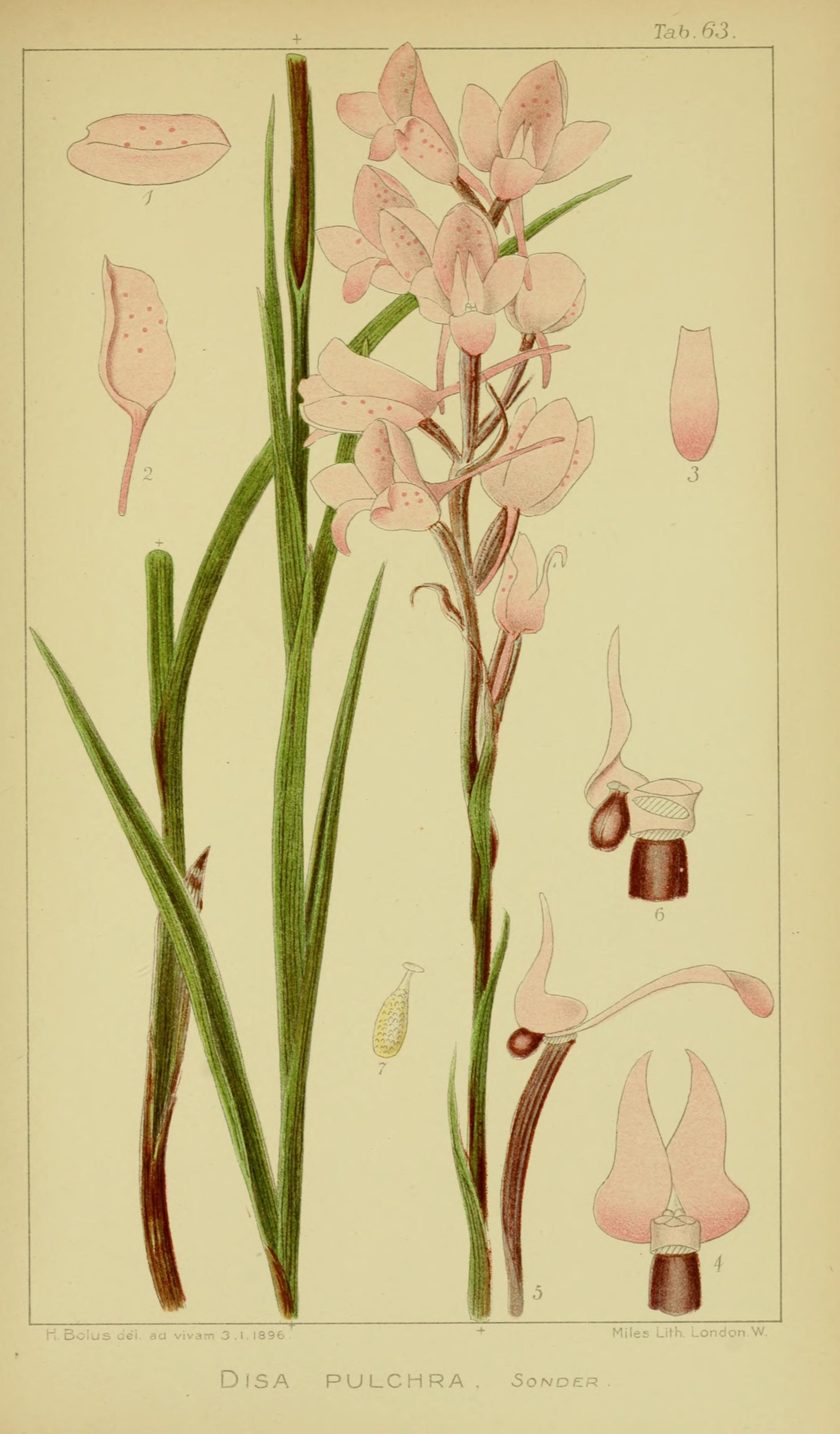

Scientific classification
- Kingdom: Plantae
- Clade: Tracheophytes
- Clade: Angiosperms
- Clade: Monocots
- Order: Asparagales
- Family: Orchidaceae
- Subfamily: Orchidoideae
- Genus: Disa
- Species: D. pulchra

Binomial name
- Disa pulchra Sond.

Synonyms
- Disa kraussii Rolfe

= Disa pulchra =

Species of flowering plant

Disa pulchra is a perennial plant and geophyte belonging to the genus Disa. The plant is native to KwaZulu-Natal, Lesotho, Eastern Cape and the Free State.
