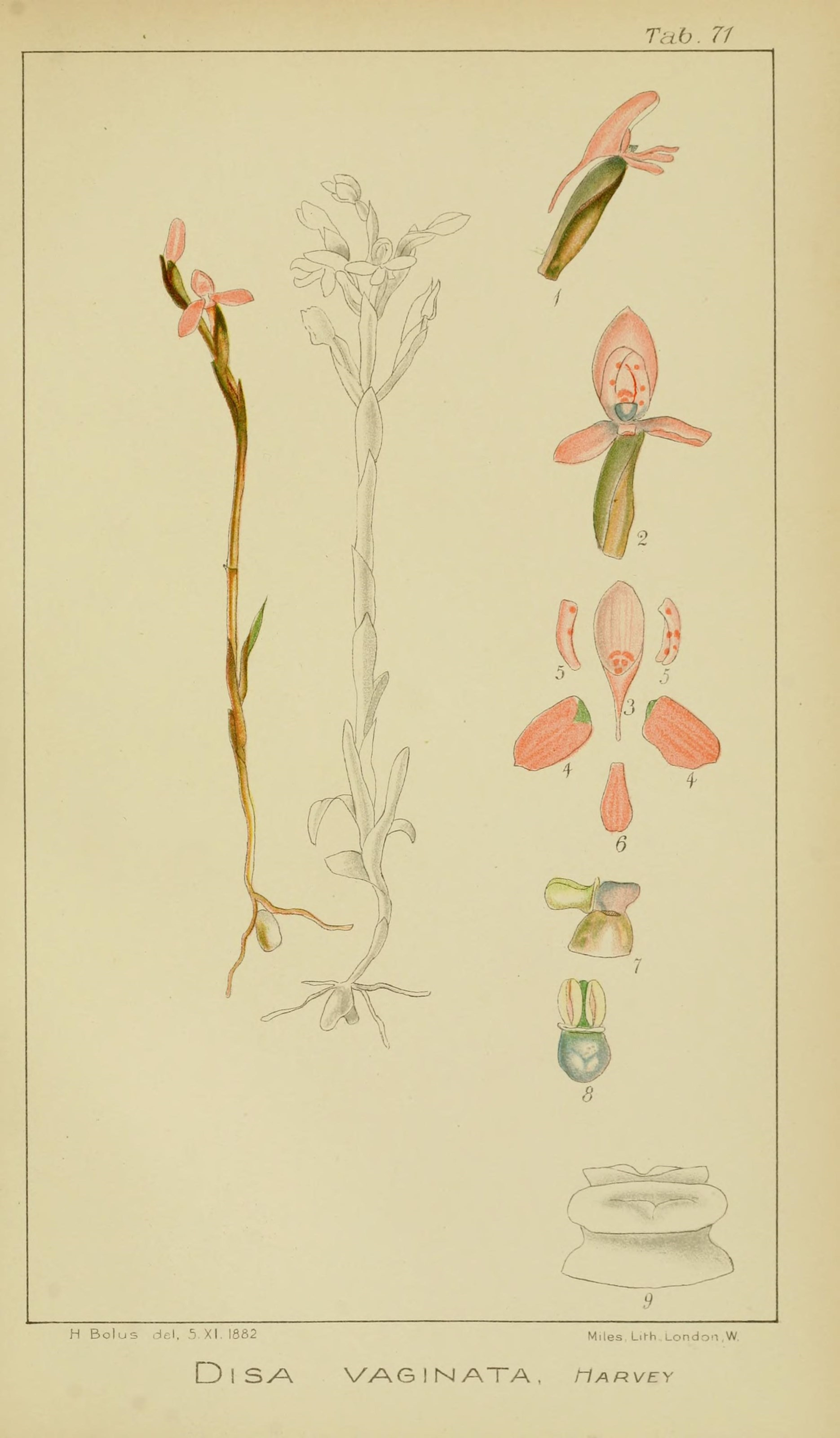

Scientific classification
- Kingdom: Plantae
- Clade: Tracheophytes
- Clade: Angiosperms
- Clade: Monocots
- Order: Asparagales
- Family: Orchidaceae
- Subfamily: Orchidoideae
- Genus: Disa
- Species: D. vaginata

Binomial name
- Disa vaginata Harv. ex Lindl.

Synonyms
- Disa modesta Rchb.f.

= Disa vaginata =

Species of flowering plant

Disa vaginata is a perennial plant and geophyte belonging to the genus Disa and is part of the fynbos. The plant is endemic to the Eastern Cape and Western Cape.
