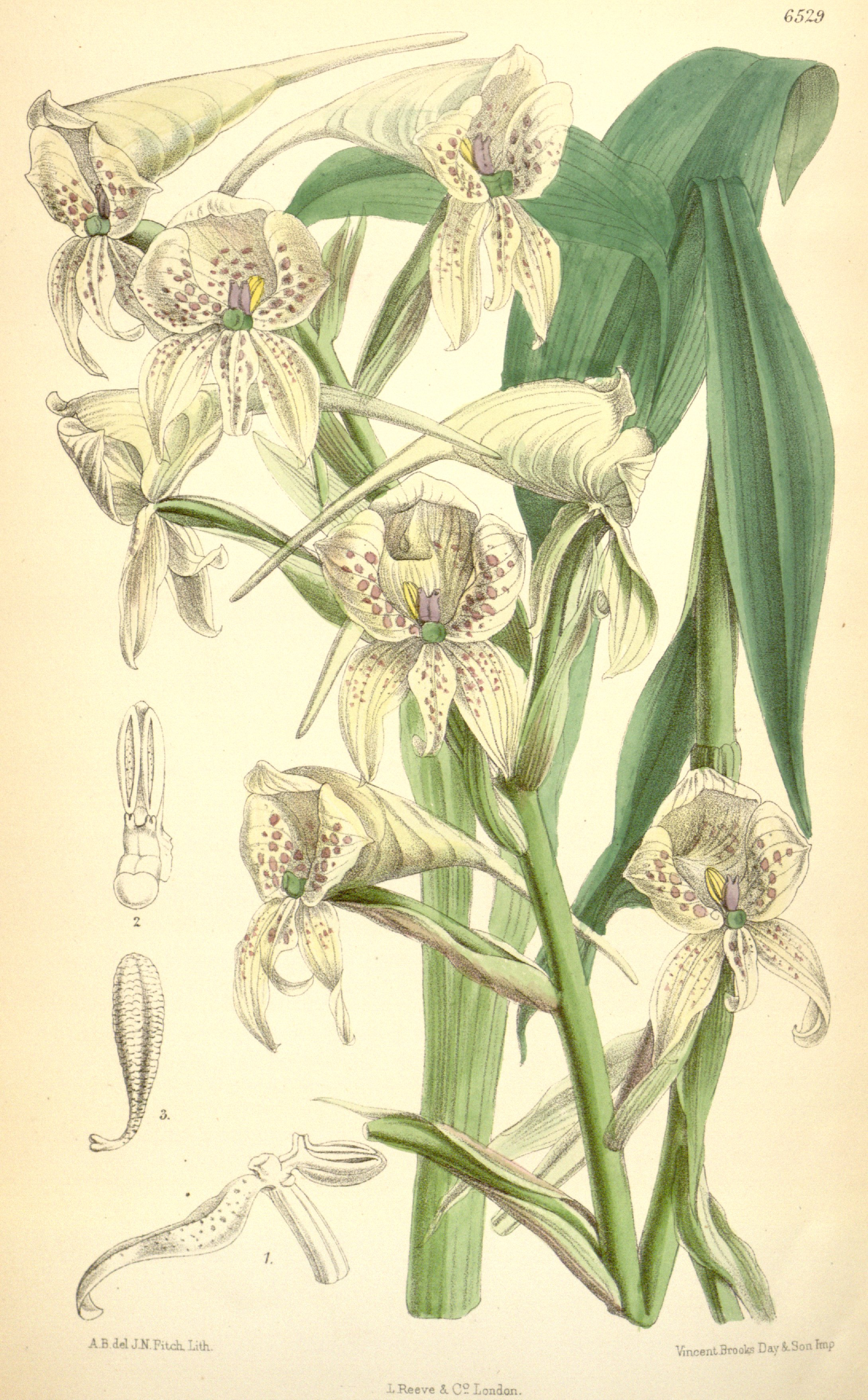

Scientific classification
- Kingdom: Plantae
- Clade: Tracheophytes
- Clade: Angiosperms
- Clade: Monocots
- Order: Asparagales
- Family: Orchidaceae
- Subfamily: Orchidoideae
- Genus: Disa
- Species: D. crassicornis

Binomial name
- Disa crassicornis Lindl.

Synonyms
- Disa jacottetiae Kraenzl.; Disa megaceras Hook.f.; Disa oliveriana Rchb.f.

= Disa crassicornis =

Species of flowering plant

Disa crassicornis is a perennial plant and geophyte belonging to the genus Disa. The plant is native to KwaZulu-Natal, Lesotho and the Eastern Cape and has no threats.
