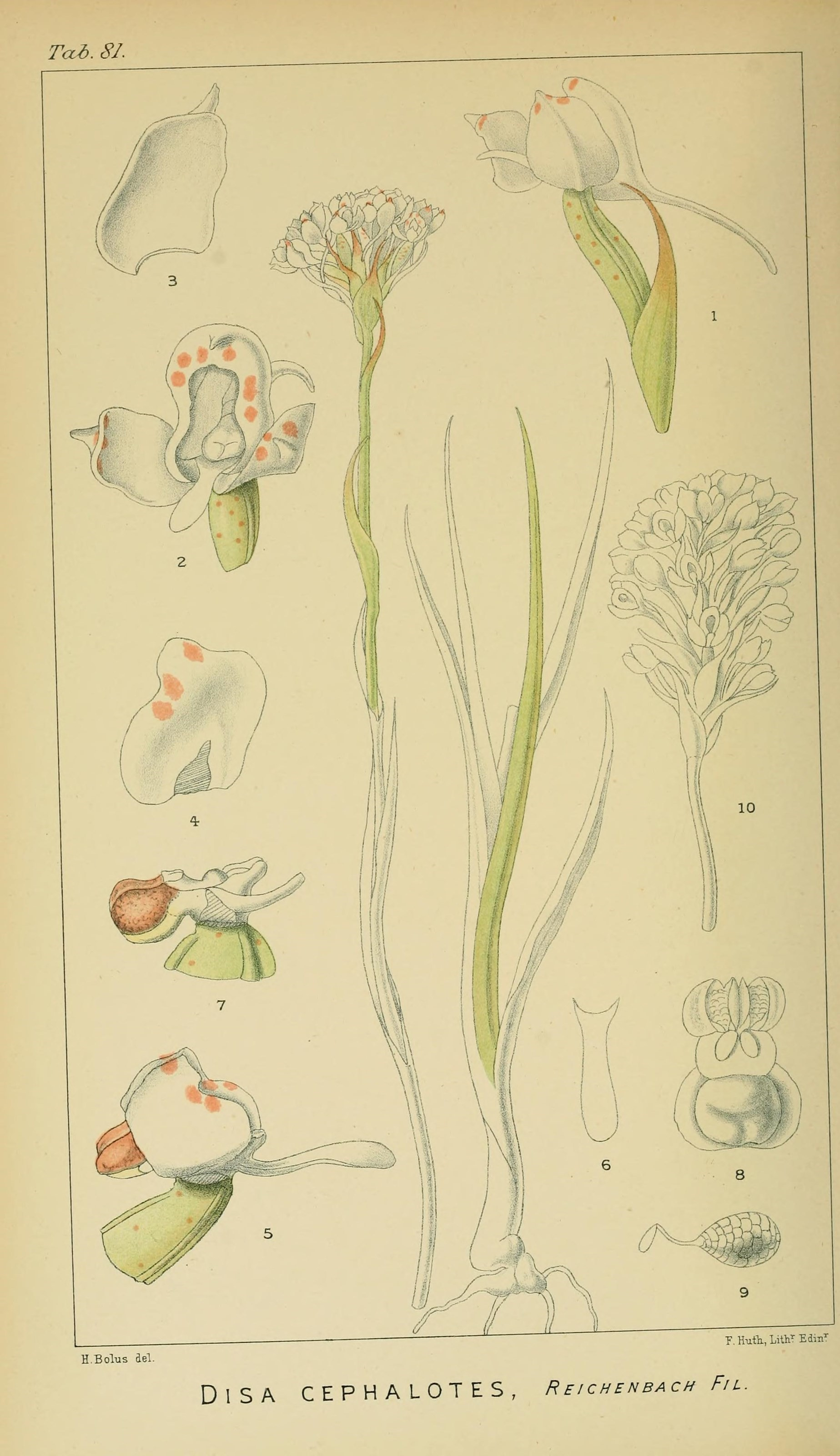

Scientific classification
- Kingdom: Plantae
- Clade: Tracheophytes
- Clade: Angiosperms
- Clade: Monocots
- Order: Asparagales
- Family: Orchidaceae
- Subfamily: Orchidoideae
- Genus: Disa
- Species: D. cephalotes

Binomial name
- Disa cephalotes Rchb.f.

= Disa cephalotes =

Species of flowering plant

Disa cephalotes is a perennial plant and geophyte belonging to the genus Disa. The plant is endemic to KwaZulu-Natal, Lesotho, the Eastern Cape and the Free State.

There are two subspecies:

- Disa cephalotes subsp. cephalotes
- Disa cephalotes subsp. frigida (Schltr.) H.P.Linder
