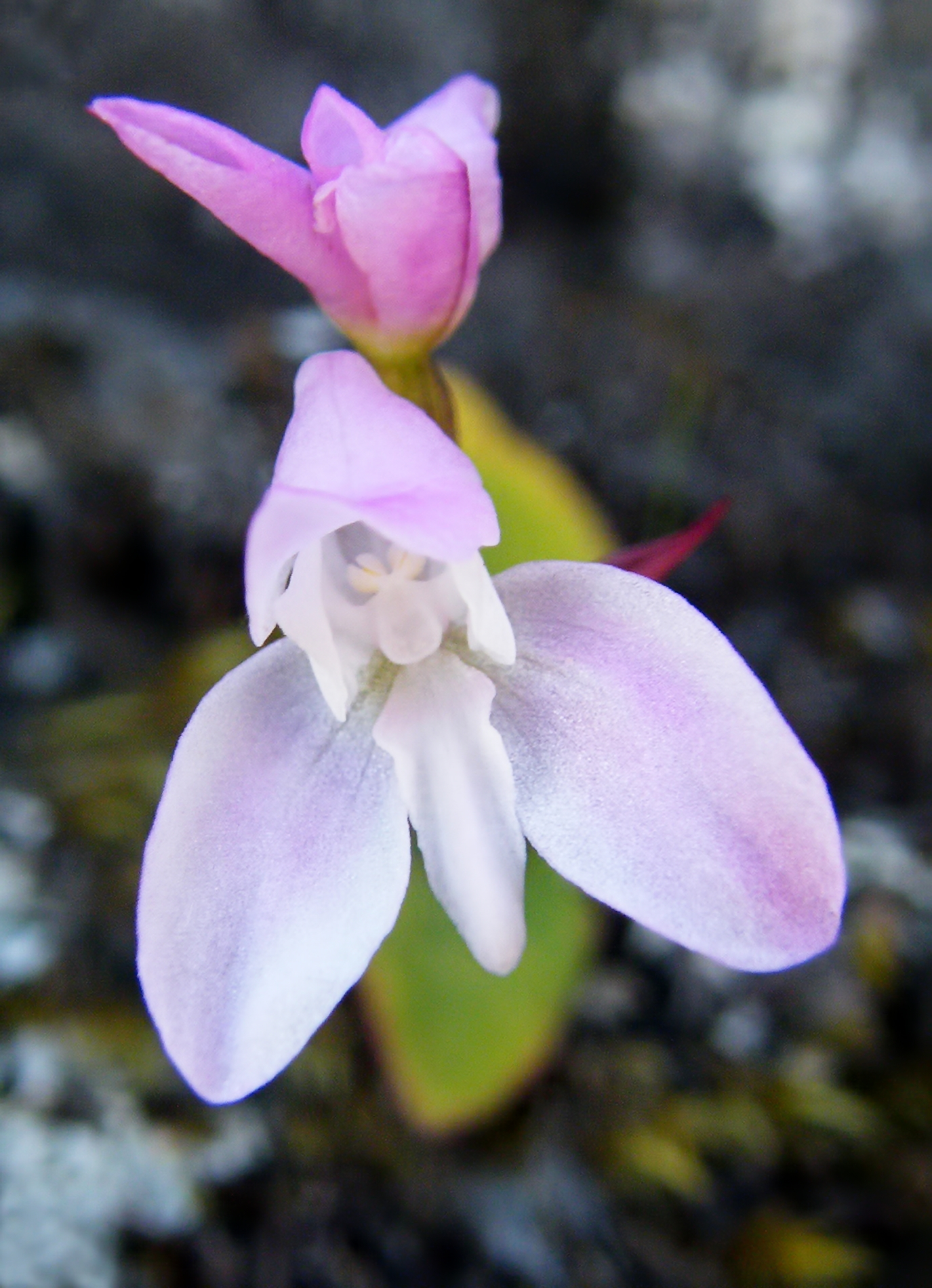

Scientific classification
- Kingdom: Plantae
- Clade: Tracheophytes
- Clade: Angiosperms
- Clade: Monocots
- Order: Asparagales
- Family: Orchidaceae
- Subfamily: Orchidoideae
- Genus: Disa
- Species: D. rosea

Binomial name
- Disa rosea Lindl.

Synonyms
- Orthopenthea rosea (Lindl.) Rolfe

= Disa rosea =

Species of flowering plant

Disa rosea is a perennial plant and geophyte belonging to the genus Disa. The plant is endemic to the Western Cape.
