= Disa welwitschii =

Scientific classification
- Kingdom: Plantae
- Clade: Tracheophytes
- Clade: Angiosperms
- Clade: Monocots
- Order: Asparagales
- Family: Orchidaceae
- Subfamily: Orchidoideae
- Genus: Disa
- Species: D. welwitschii

Binomial name
- Disa welwitschii Rchb.f.

Species of flowering plant

Disa welwitschii is a perennial plant and geophyte belonging to the genus Disa. The plant is native to Angola, Burundi, Democratic Republic of Congo, Gabon, Guinea, Ivory Coast, Cameroon, Kenya, Liberia, Malawi, Mozambique, Nigeria, Uganda, Republic of Congo, Central African Republic, Sierra Leone, Sudan, Tanzania, Zambia and Zimbabwe. In South Africa, the plant occurs in Limpopo.

There are two subspecies:

- Disa welwitschii subsp. occultans (Schltr.) H.P.Linder
- Disa welwitschii subsp. welwitschii
