= Liparis deistelii =

Scientific classification
- Kingdom: Plantae
- Clade: Tracheophytes
- Clade: Angiosperms
- Clade: Monocots
- Order: Asparagales
- Family: Orchidaceae
- Subfamily: Epidendroideae
- Genus: Liparis
- Species: L. deistelii

Binomial name
- Liparis deistelii Schltr., 1906

Species of plant

Liparis deistelii is a species of widelip orchid found in tropical Africa.

== Taxonomy and naming ==
The species Liparis deistelii was first formally described in 1906 by Rudolf Schlechter.
