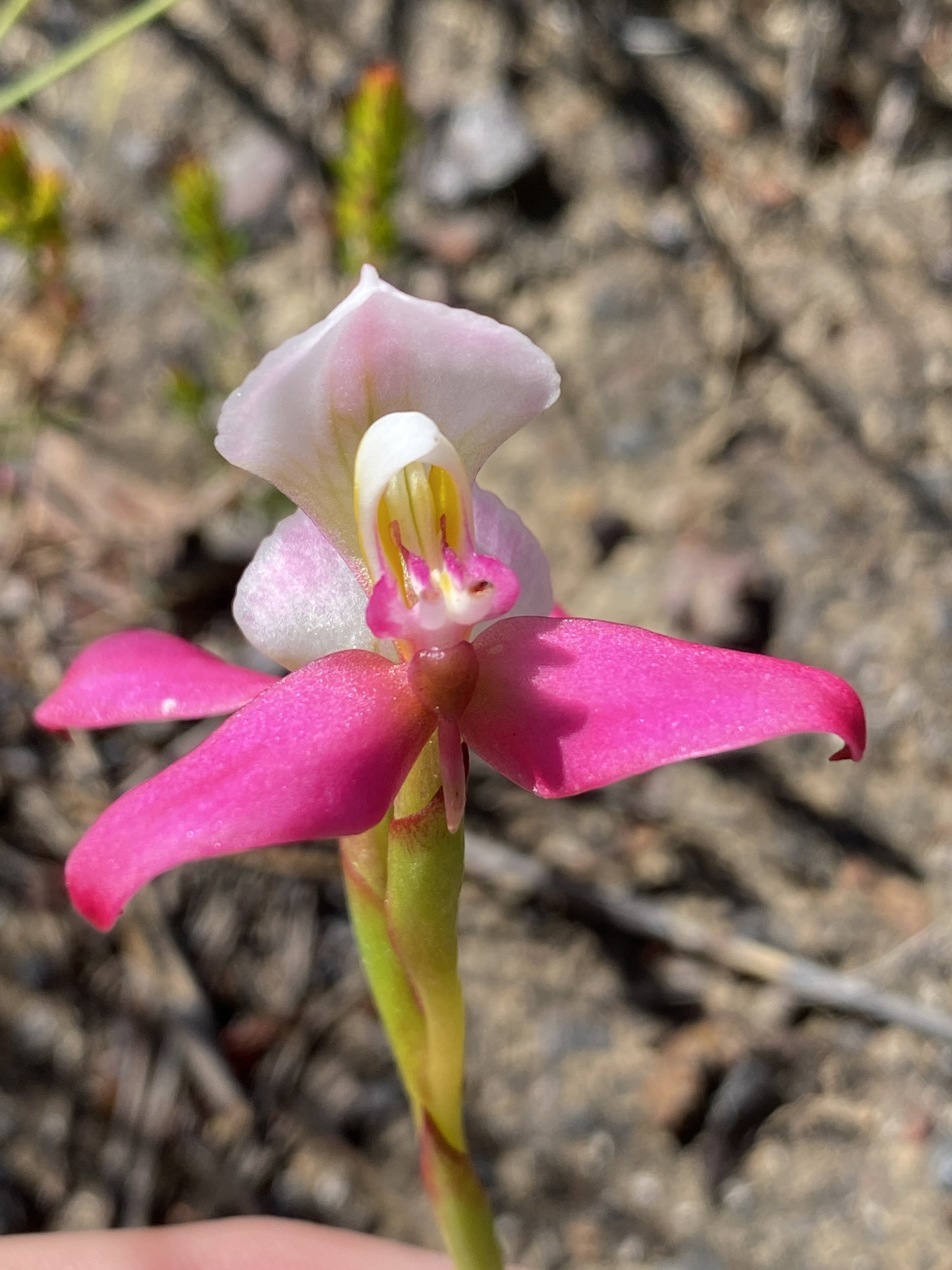

Scientific classification
- Kingdom: Plantae
- Clade: Tracheophytes
- Clade: Angiosperms
- Clade: Monocots
- Order: Asparagales
- Family: Orchidaceae
- Subfamily: Orchidoideae
- Genus: Disa
- Species: D. filicornis

Binomial name
- Disa filicornis (L.f.) Thunb.

Synonyms
- Disa patens Sw.; Disa reflexa (Lindl.) Rchb.f.; Orchis filicornis L.f.; Penthea filicornis (L.f.) Lindl.; Penthea reflexa Lindl.

= Disa filicornis =

Species of flowering plant

Disa filicornis is a perennial plant and geophyte belonging to the genus Disa and is part of the fynbos. The plant is endemic to the Eastern Cape and the Western Cape.
