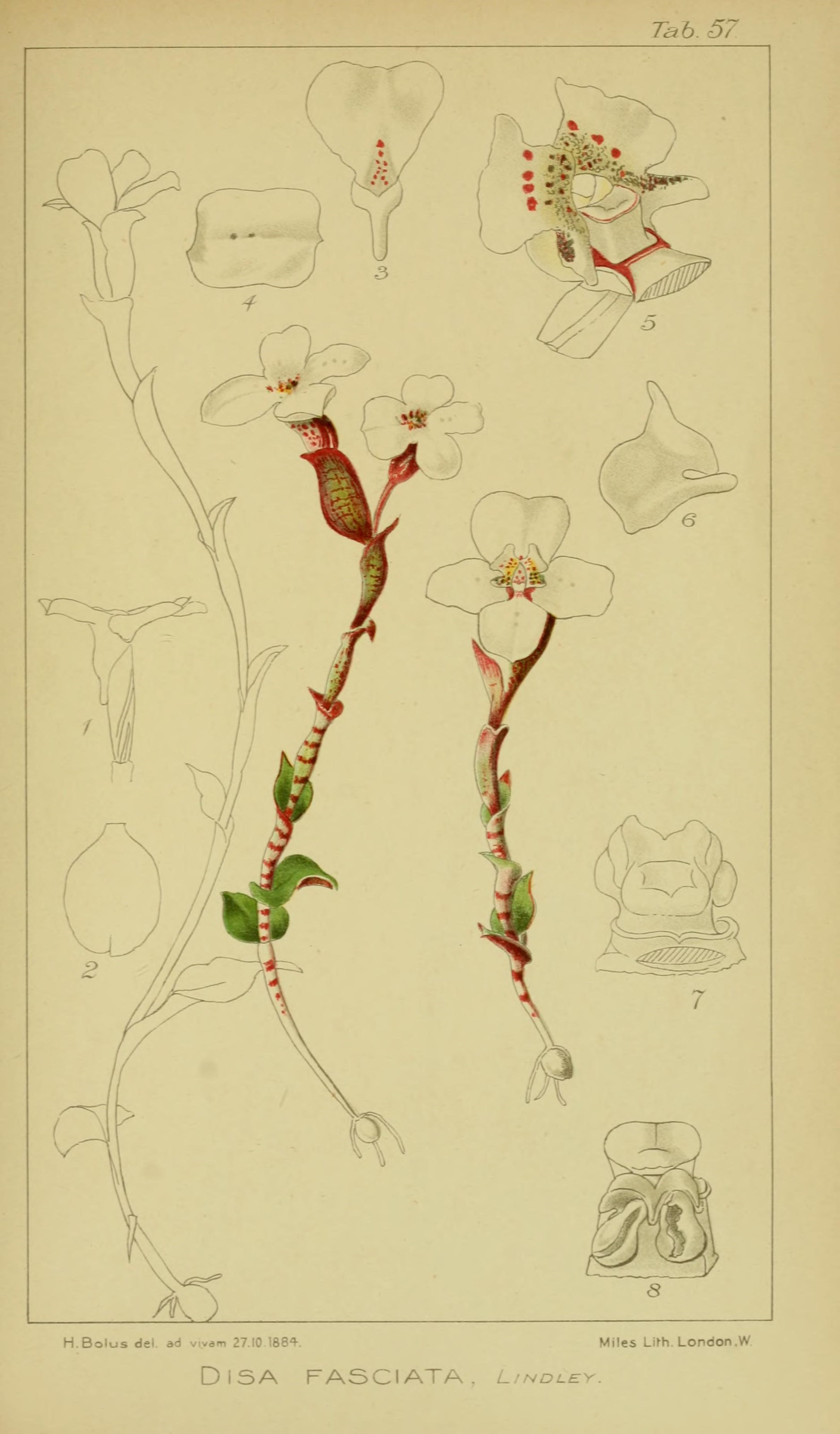

Scientific classification
- Kingdom: Plantae
- Clade: Tracheophytes
- Clade: Angiosperms
- Clade: Monocots
- Order: Asparagales
- Family: Orchidaceae
- Subfamily: Orchidoideae
- Genus: Disa
- Species: D. fasciata

Binomial name
- Disa fasciata Lindl., (1838)

Synonyms
- Orthopenthea fasciata (Lindl.) Rolfe

= Disa fasciata =

Species of flowering plant

Disa fasciata is a perennial plant and geophyte belonging to the genus Disa and is part of the fynbos. The plant is endemic to the Western Cape.
