= Disa saxicola =

Scientific classification
- Kingdom: Plantae
- Clade: Embryophytes
- Clade: Tracheophytes
- Clade: Angiosperms
- Clade: Monocots
- Order: Asparagales
- Family: Orchidaceae
- Subfamily: Orchidoideae
- Genus: Disa
- Species: D. saxicola

Binomial name
- Disa saxicola Schltr.

Synonyms
- Disa uliginosa Kraenzl.

Species of flowering plant

Disa saxicola is a perennial plant and geophyte belonging to the genus Disa. The plant is native to Eswatini, KwaZulu-Natal, Limpopo, Malawi, Mozambique, Mpumalanga, Tanzania, Zambia and Zimbabwe.
