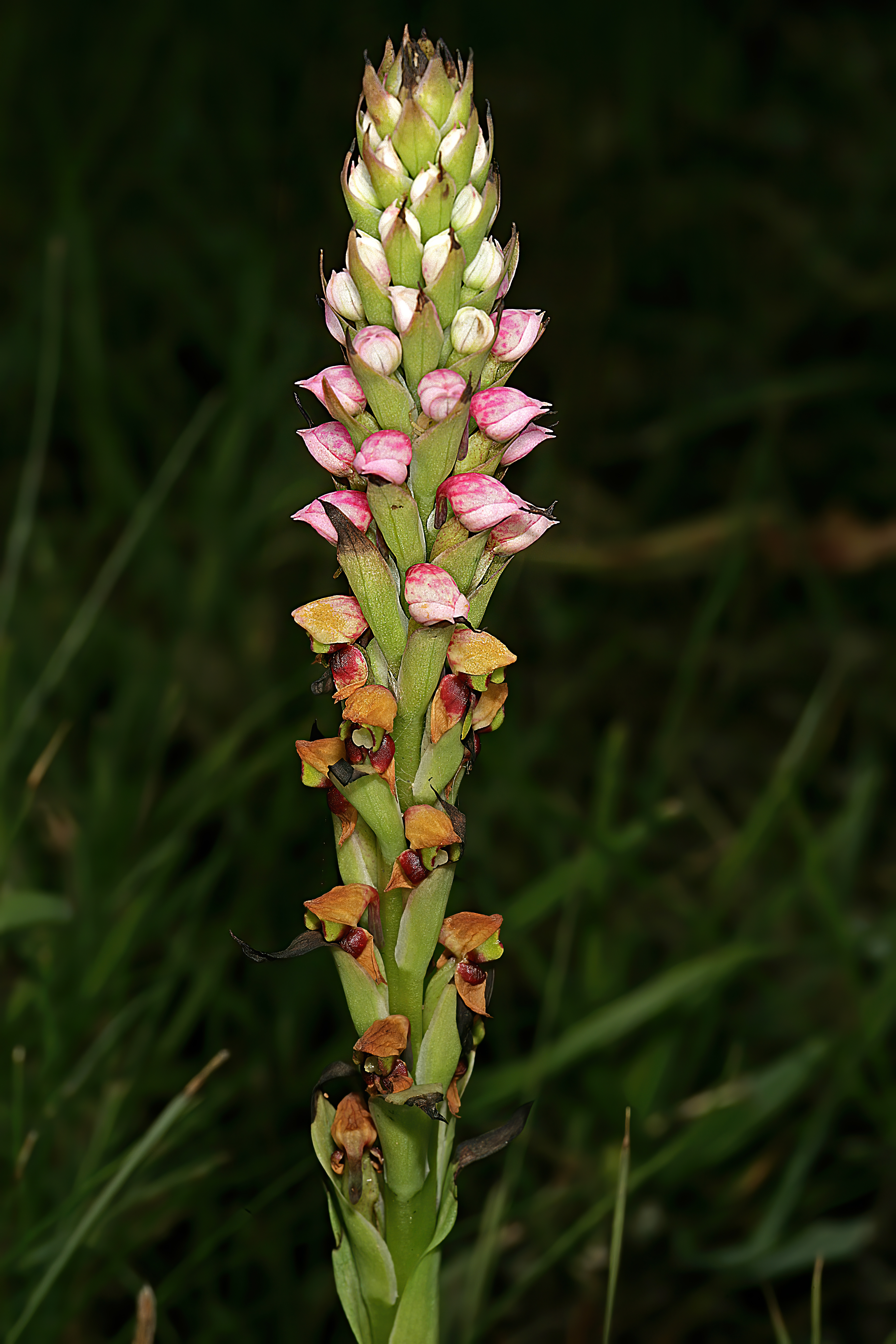

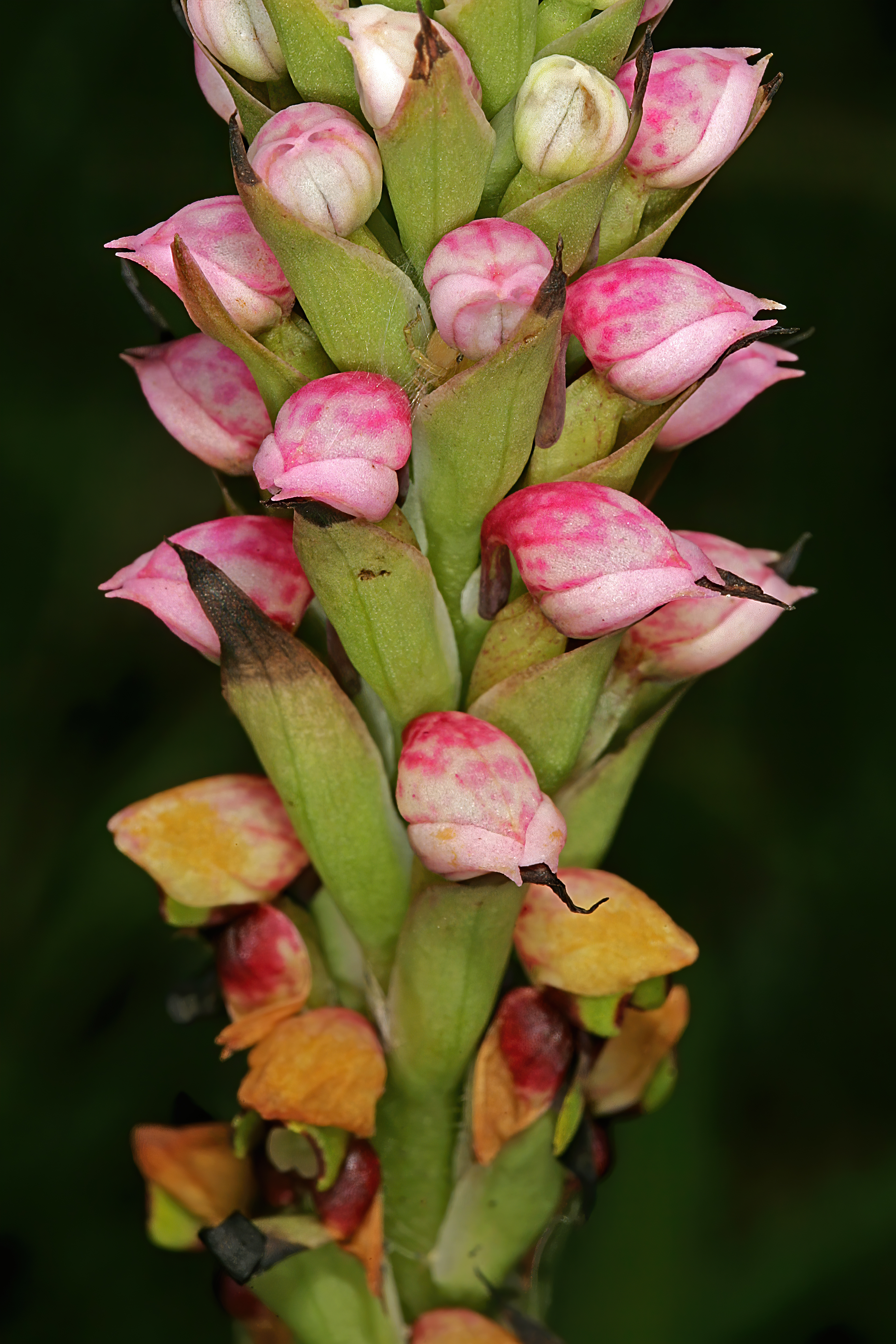

Scientific classification
- Kingdom: Plantae
- Clade: Tracheophytes
- Clade: Angiosperms
- Clade: Monocots
- Order: Asparagales
- Family: Orchidaceae
- Subfamily: Orchidoideae
- Genus: Disa
- Species: D. versicolor

Binomial name
- Disa versicolor Rchb.f.

Synonyms
- Disa hemisphaerophora Rchb.f.; Disa mac-owanii Rchb.f.

= Disa versicolor =

Species of flowering plant

Disa versicolor, the apple-blossum orchid, is a perennial plant and geophyte belonging to the genus Disa. In South Africa, the plant is native to Gauteng, KwaZulu-Natal, Limpopo, Mpumalanga, Eastern Cape and the Free State. Outside South Africa, the plant is native to Angola, Eswatini, Lesotho, Mozambique and Zimbabwe.
