= Disa patula =

Scientific classification
- Kingdom: Plantae
- Clade: Tracheophytes
- Clade: Angiosperms
- Clade: Monocots
- Order: Asparagales
- Family: Orchidaceae
- Subfamily: Orchidoideae
- Genus: Disa
- Species: D. patula

Binomial name
- Disa patula Sond.

Species of flowering plant

Disa patula is a perennial plant and geophyte belonging to the genus Disa. In South Africa, the plant is native to KwaZulu-Natal, Mpumalanga and the Eastern Cape. It also occurs in Eswatini and Zimbabwe.

There are two varieties:

- Disa patula var. patula
- Disa patula var. transvaalensis Summerh.
