= Disa aperta =

Scientific classification
- Kingdom: Plantae
- Clade: Tracheophytes
- Clade: Angiosperms
- Clade: Monocots
- Order: Asparagales
- Family: Orchidaceae
- Subfamily: Orchidoideae
- Genus: Disa
- Species: D. aperta

Binomial name
- Disa aperta N.E.Br.

Species of flowering plant

Disa aperta is a perennial plant and geophyte belonging to the genus Disa. The species is native to Malawi, Tanzania and Zambia.
