= Disa nigerica =

Scientific classification
- Kingdom: Plantae
- Clade: Embryophytes
- Clade: Tracheophytes
- Clade: Angiosperms
- Clade: Monocots
- Order: Asparagales
- Family: Orchidaceae
- Subfamily: Orchidoideae
- Genus: Disa
- Species: D. nigerica

Binomial name
- Disa nigerica Rolfe

Species of flowering plant

Disa nigerica is a perennial plant and geophyte belonging to the genus Disa. The plant is native to the Democratic Republic of the Congo, Cameroon, and Nigeria.
