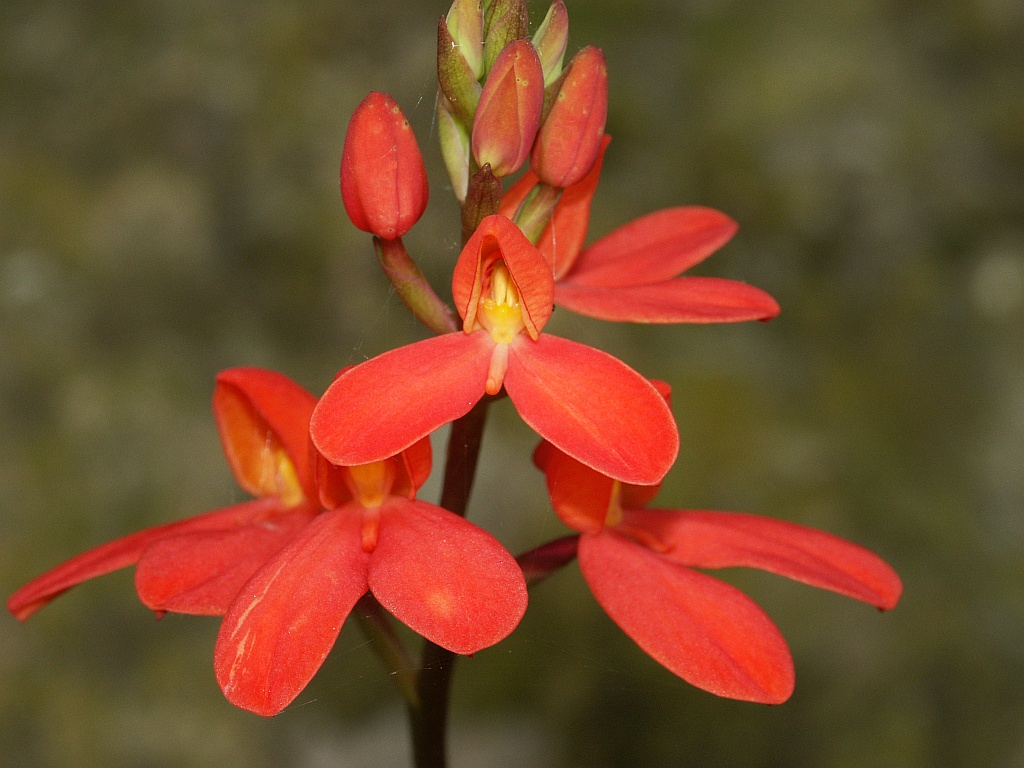
- Disa cardinalis
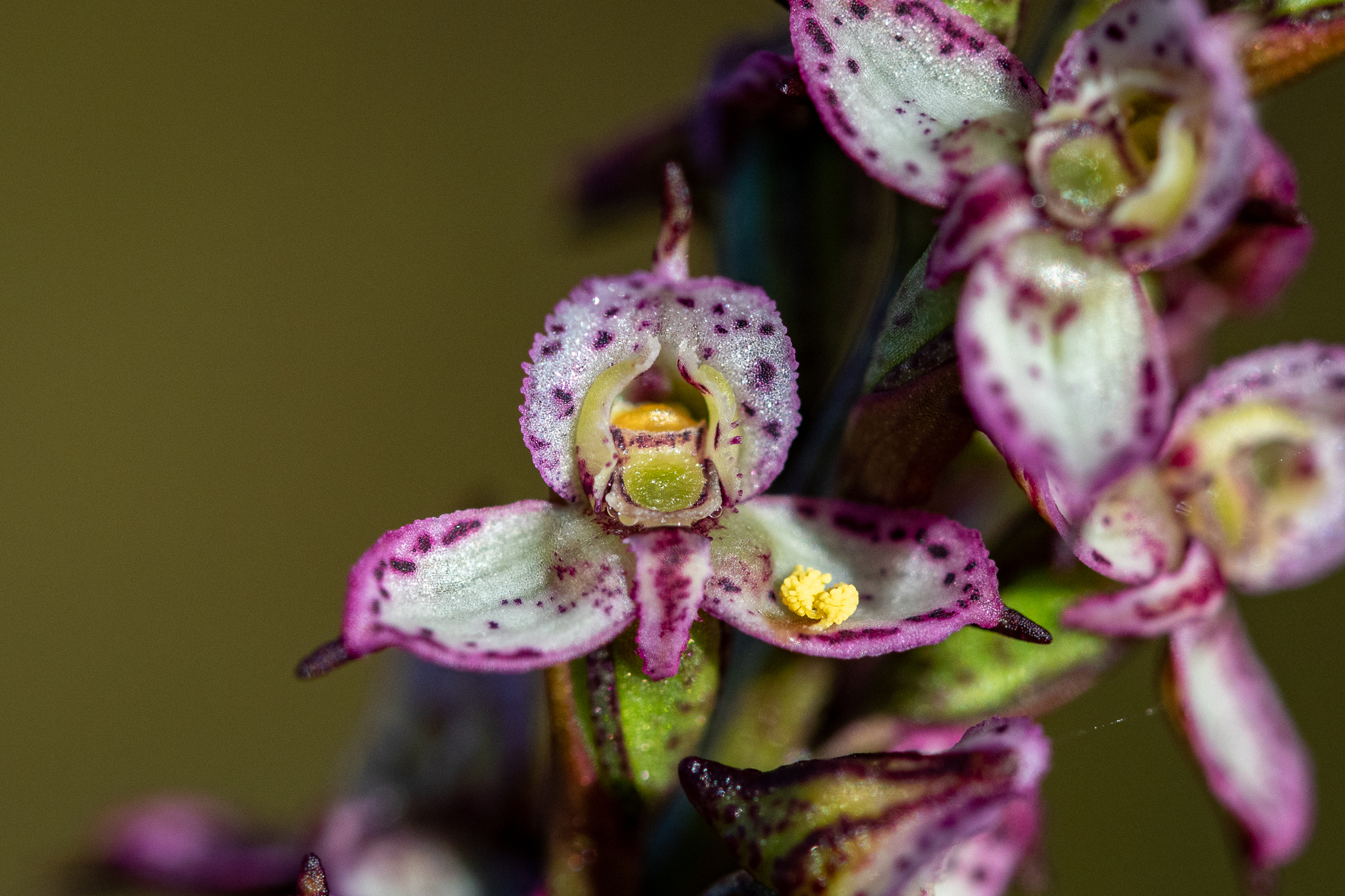
- Disa tenuis

Scientific classification
- Kingdom: Plantae
- Clade: Tracheophytes
- Clade: Angiosperms
- Clade: Monocots
- Order: Asparagales
- Family: Orchidaceae
- Subfamily: Orchidoideae
- Tribe: Orchideae
- Subtribe: Disinae
- Genus: Disa; P.J.Bergius 1767

Type species
- Disa uniflora P.J.Bergius

Species
- See text

Synonyms
- List: Repandra Lindl.; Penthea Lindl.; Forficaria Lindl.; Gamaria Raf.; Herschelia Lindl.; Monadenia Lindl.; Schizodium Lindl.; Orthopenthea Rolfe in W.H.Harvey; Amphigena Rolfe in W.H.Harvey; Herschelianthe Rauschert; × Herscheliodisa H.P.Linder

= Disa (plant) =

Genus of flowering plants in the orchid family

Disa is a genus of flowering plants in the family Orchidaceae. It comprises about 182 species. Most of the species are indigenous to tropical and southern Africa, with a few more in the Arabian Peninsula, Madagascar, and Réunion. Disa bracteata is naturalised in Western Australia, where the local name is "African weed-orchid."

The genus Disa was named by P.J. Bergius in 1767. It was named after Disa, the heroine of a Swedish legend.

== Description ==
The plants grow from a fleshy tuberous root which is a source of maltodextrins which are used as a sugar substitute. Some species attain a height of 90 cm (35 in). The flowers are solitary or arranged in racemes. The petals and the lip are small. The flowers consist essentially of the sepals. The flowers range in color from very light to dark red.

== Pollination ==
Disa exhibits a variety of pollination syndromes. Each species of Disa usually has a single species as pollinator and nearly every available pollinating insect is employed by some species of Disa. Species that adapted to the same pollinator often independently evolved a similar floral morphology which confounded the infrageneric classification of Disa until cladistic analysis was applied to DNA sequences from this genus.

Examples of convergent evolution in Disa pollination include the following:

- flowers pollinated by butterflies have evolved twice, for example the pollination of Disa uniflora and Disa ferruginea by the Table Mountain Pride butterfly (Aeropetes tulbaghia) (Satyrinae)
- flowers with conspicuous deception, pollinated by carpenter bees, have evolved twice.
- long-spurred flowers, pollinated by long-tongued flies, have evolved four times.
- night-scented flowers, pollinated by moths, have evolved three times.

Disa serves as an example of how speciation can be caused by changes in pollinator availability and evolution.

Some Disa species are pollinated by sunbirds and have pollinaria that stick to the feet of the sunbirds when they perch on the inflorescence.

== Phylogeny ==
The first molecular phylogeny of the genus involved comparison of nuclear ribosomal ITS1, 5.8S rDNA, and ITS2 sequences, and showed that Herschelia and Monadenia were nested within a paraphyletic Disa.

In Genera Orchidacearum volume 2, Disa and Schizodium compose the subtribe Disinae of the tribe Diseae. After that volume was published in 2001, molecular phylogenetic studies showed that Schizodium is nested within Disa. Schizodium comprises only six species, all endemic to South Africa.

In a classification of orchids that was published in 2015, Chase et alii placed Schizodium in synonymy under Disa. They also defined the subtribe Disinae as consisting of Pachites, Disa and Huttonaea. This version of Disinae is probably not monophyletic, but was created as a holding classification, to avoid the unnecessary designation of subtribes before further studies can clarify the relationships of these three genera.

== Seeds ==
The genus can be split into two groups based on the size of the seeds. Those with relatively large balloon-shaped seeds up to 1.5 mm long belong to the Disa uniflora group. The remaining species have seeds that are smaller than 0.7 mm. The Disa uniflora group comprises plants that grow along stream sides: Disa uniflora, Disa tripetaloides, Disa cardinalis, Disa caulescens and Disa aurata. They belong to the few species in Orchidaceae that do not rely on mycorrhizal fungi for germination, and are thought to be an adaptation to hydrochory. This pattern was later extended to split the genus into summer rainfall species and non-summer rainfall species. Those in the second group added Disa cornuta to the list of Disa seeds that germinate readily.

== Horticulture ==
The species Disa uniflora is well known as an ornamental. It is a spectacular red orchid known as "The Pride of Table Mountain." Other commonly cultivated species include Disa aurata, Disa cardinalis, Disa crassicornis, Disa racemosa, Disa sagittalis, and Disa tripetaloides. Some of the species are grown only in African gardens.

Once very rare in cultivation, Disa uniflora is gaining in popularity as a cut flower. However, they are difficult to grow, because of the needed mineral composition of the potting soil. Also, if exposed to excessive moisture, they can be easily killed by rot.

=== Hybrids ===
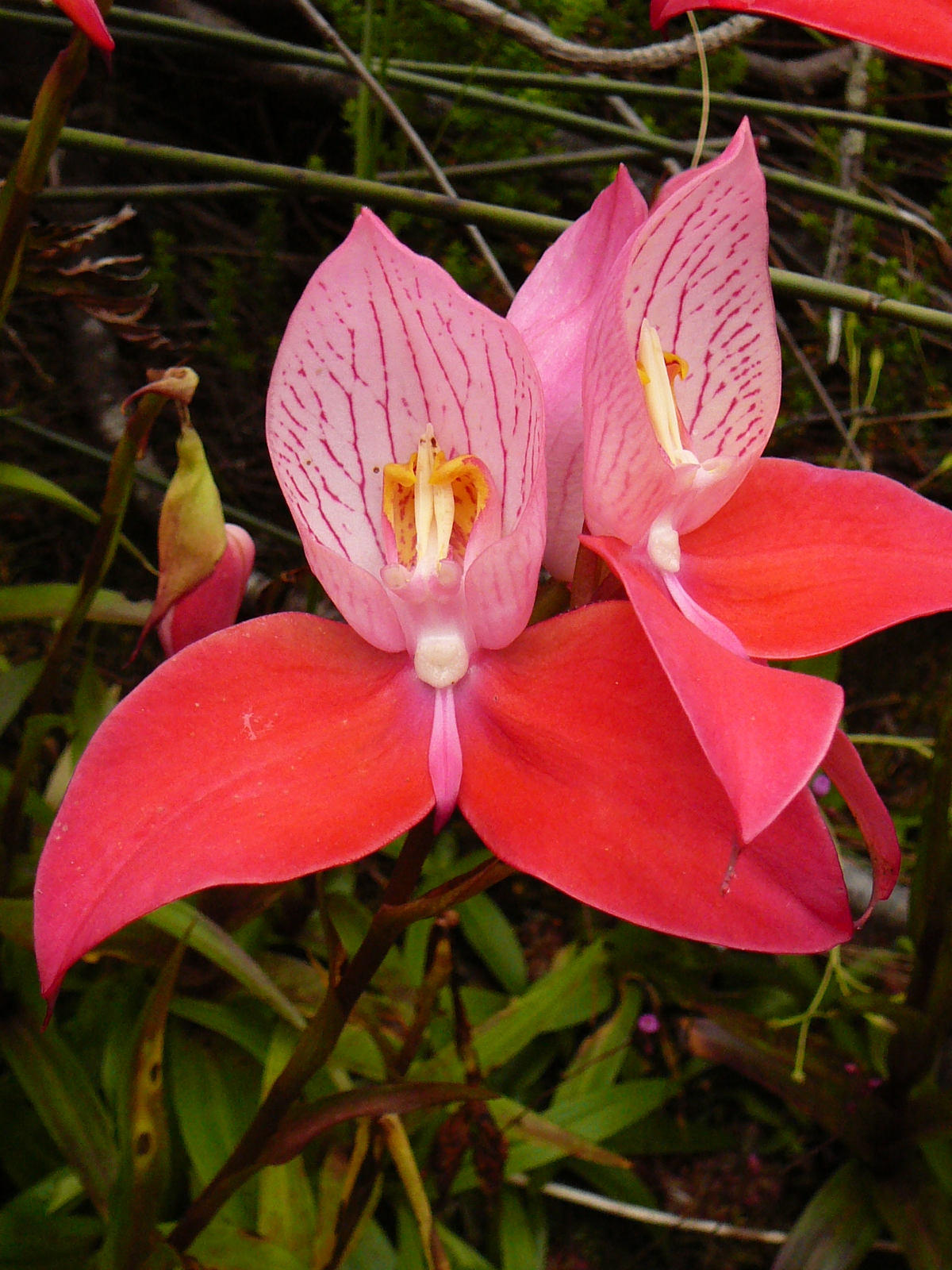
Disa uniflora flowers

The following species have been used to create more than 400 hybrids : Disa cardinalis, Disa caulescens, Disa racemosa, Disa tripetaloides, Disa uniflora, Disa aurata and Disa venosa.

- Disa × brendae (D. caulescens × D. uniflora) (South Africa, SW. Cape Prov.)
- Disa × maculomarronina (D. hircicornis × D. versicolor) (S. Africa)..
- Disa × nuwebergensis (D. caulescens × D. tripetaloides) (South Africa, Cape Prov.).
- Disa × paludicola (D. chrysostachya × D. rhodantha) (South Africa, KwaZulu-Natal).
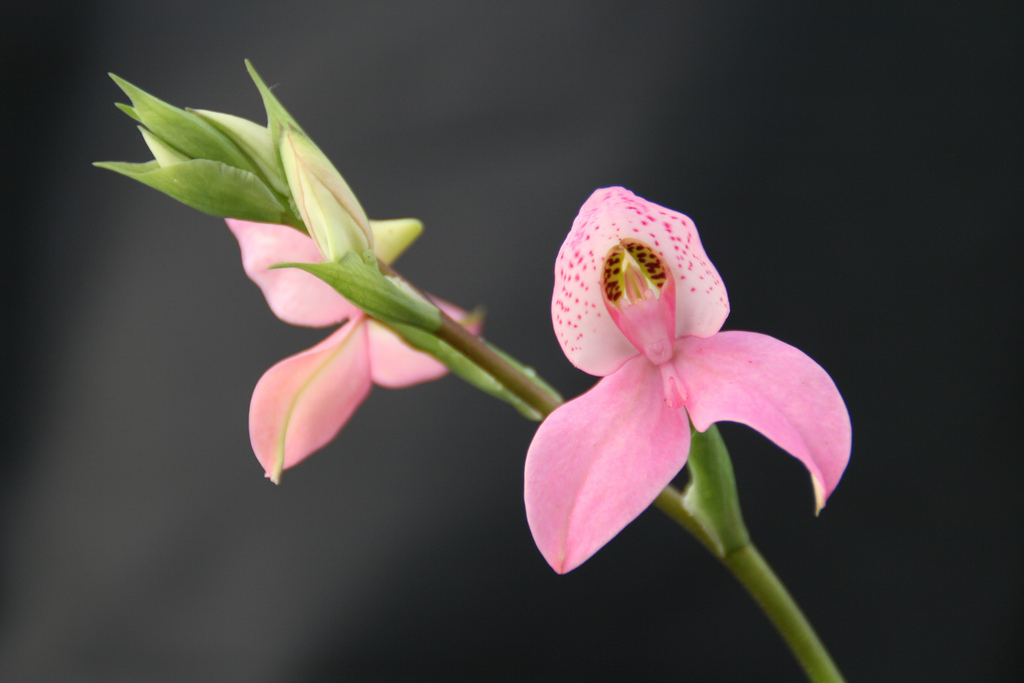
  Disa Kewensis (D. uniflora × D. tripetaloides)
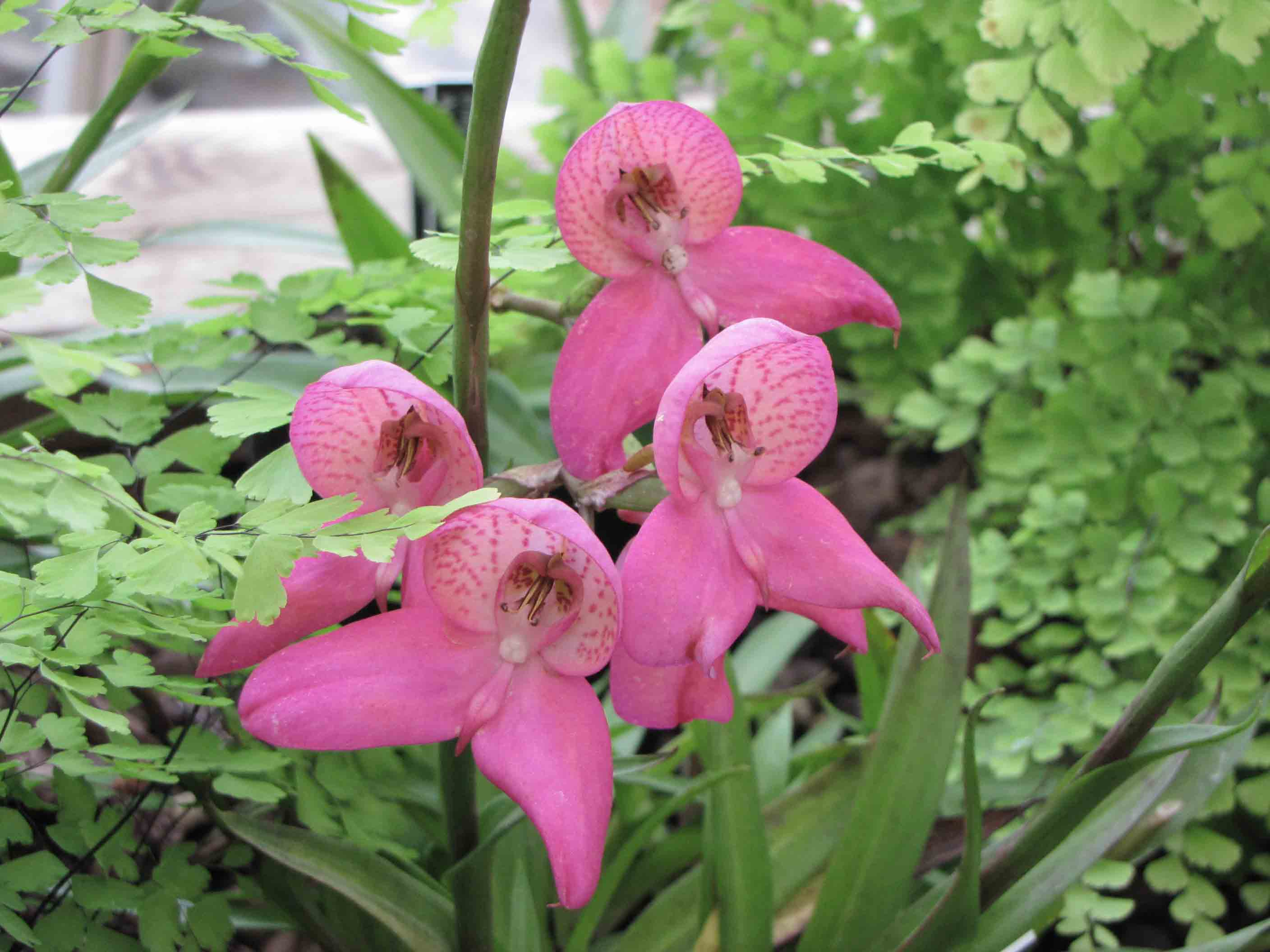
  Disa Watsonii (D. uniflora × D. Kewensis)

== Species ==
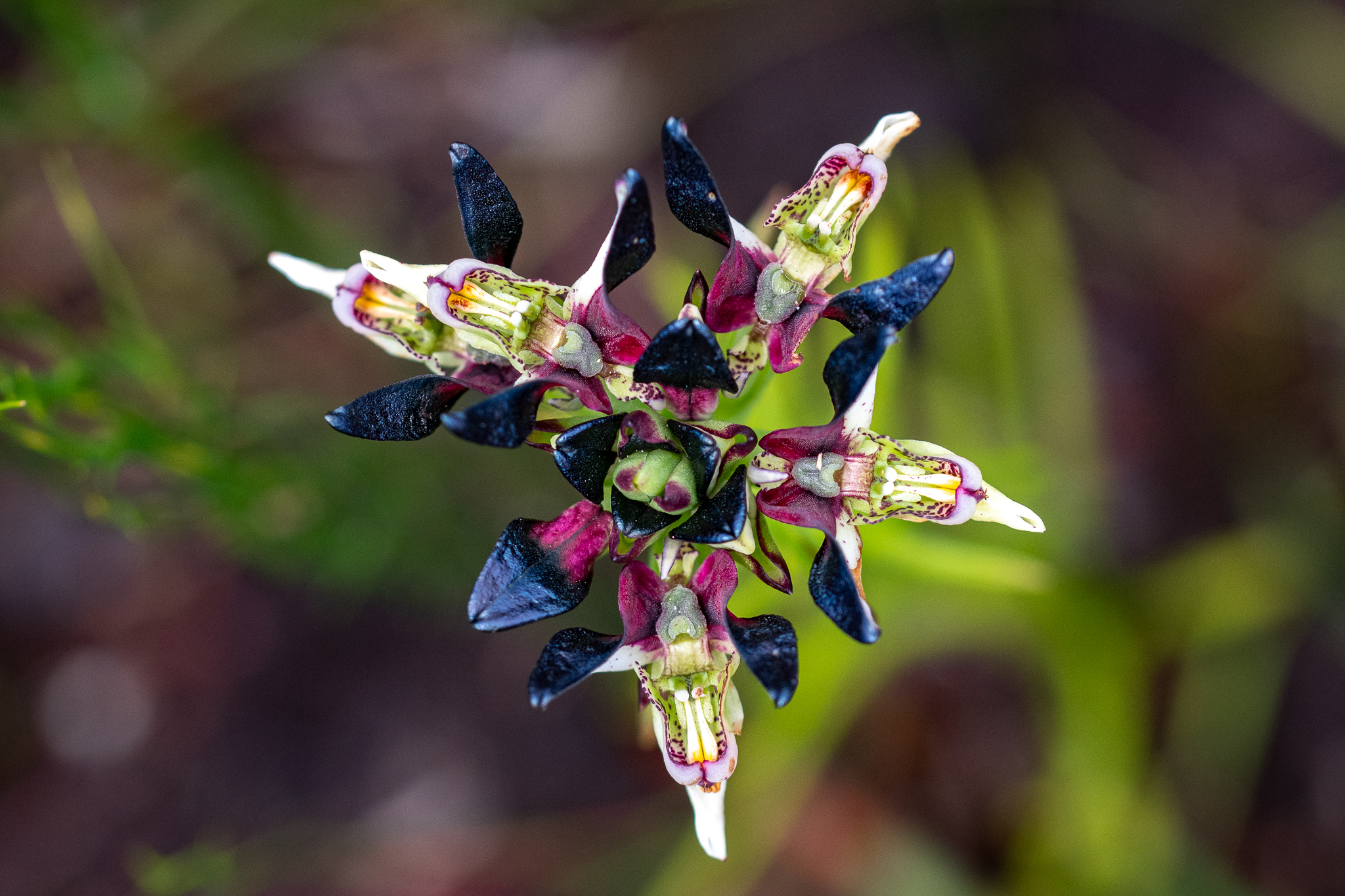
Disa atricapilla

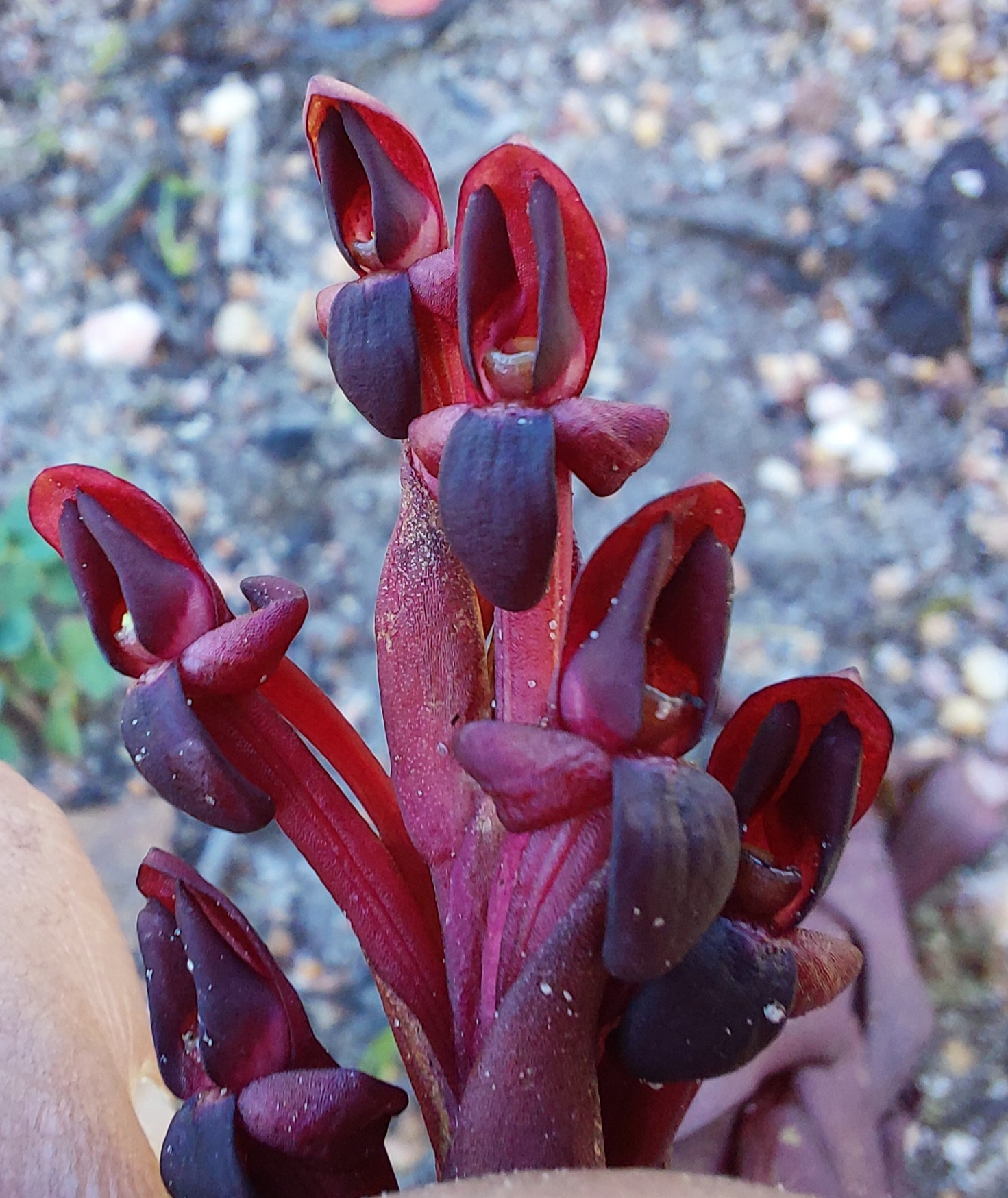
Disa atrorubens

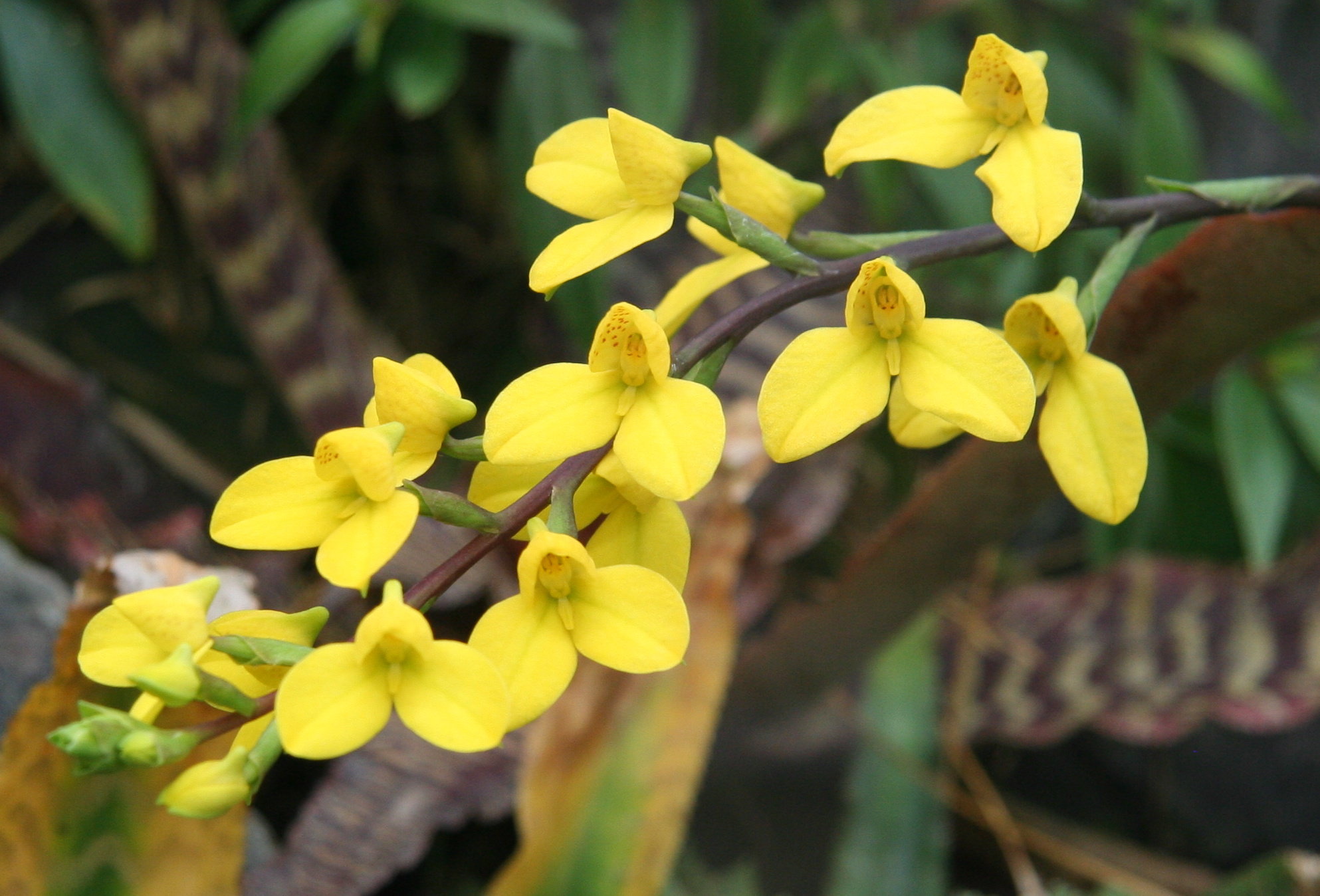
Disa aurata

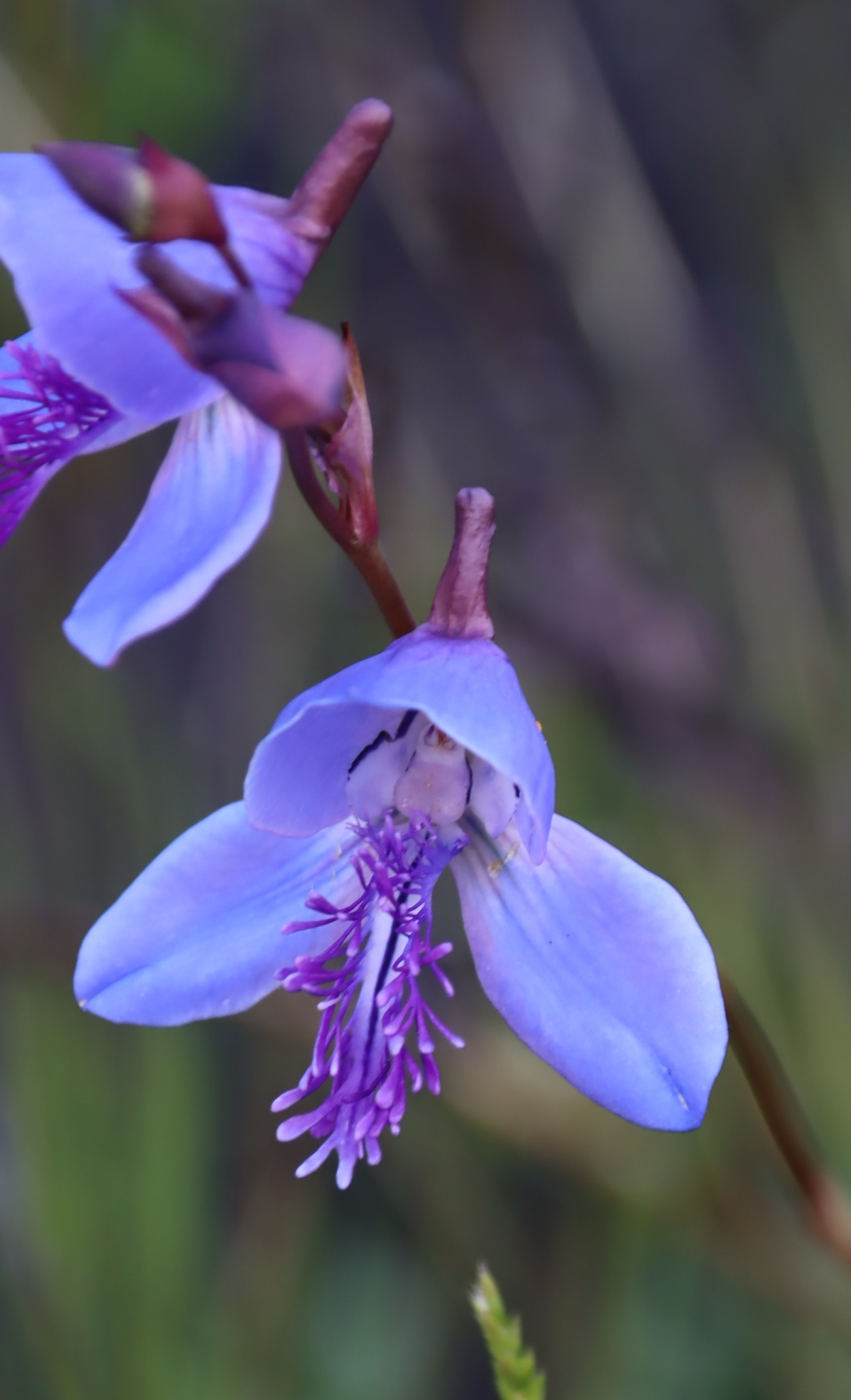
Disa baurii

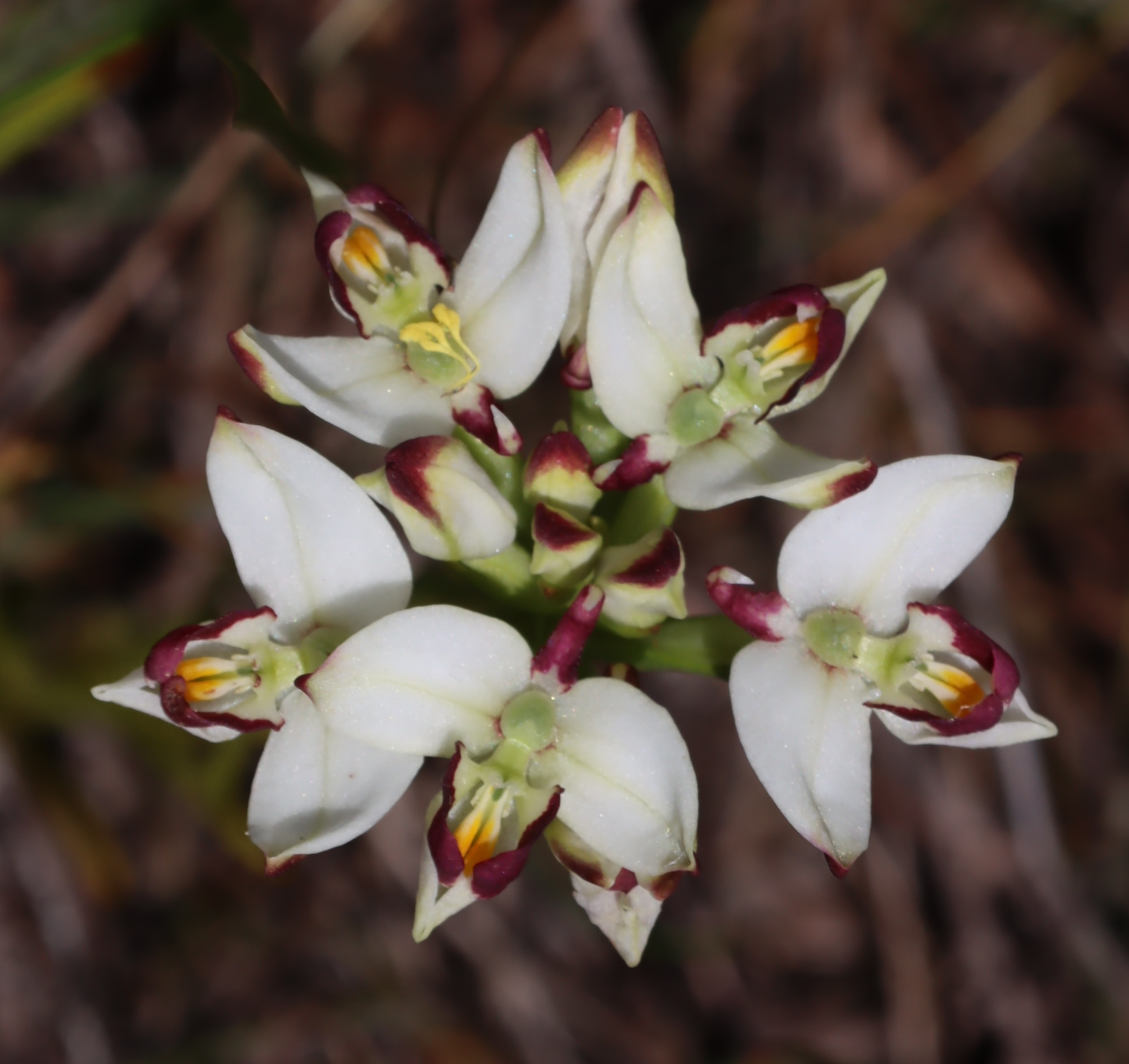
Disa bivalvata

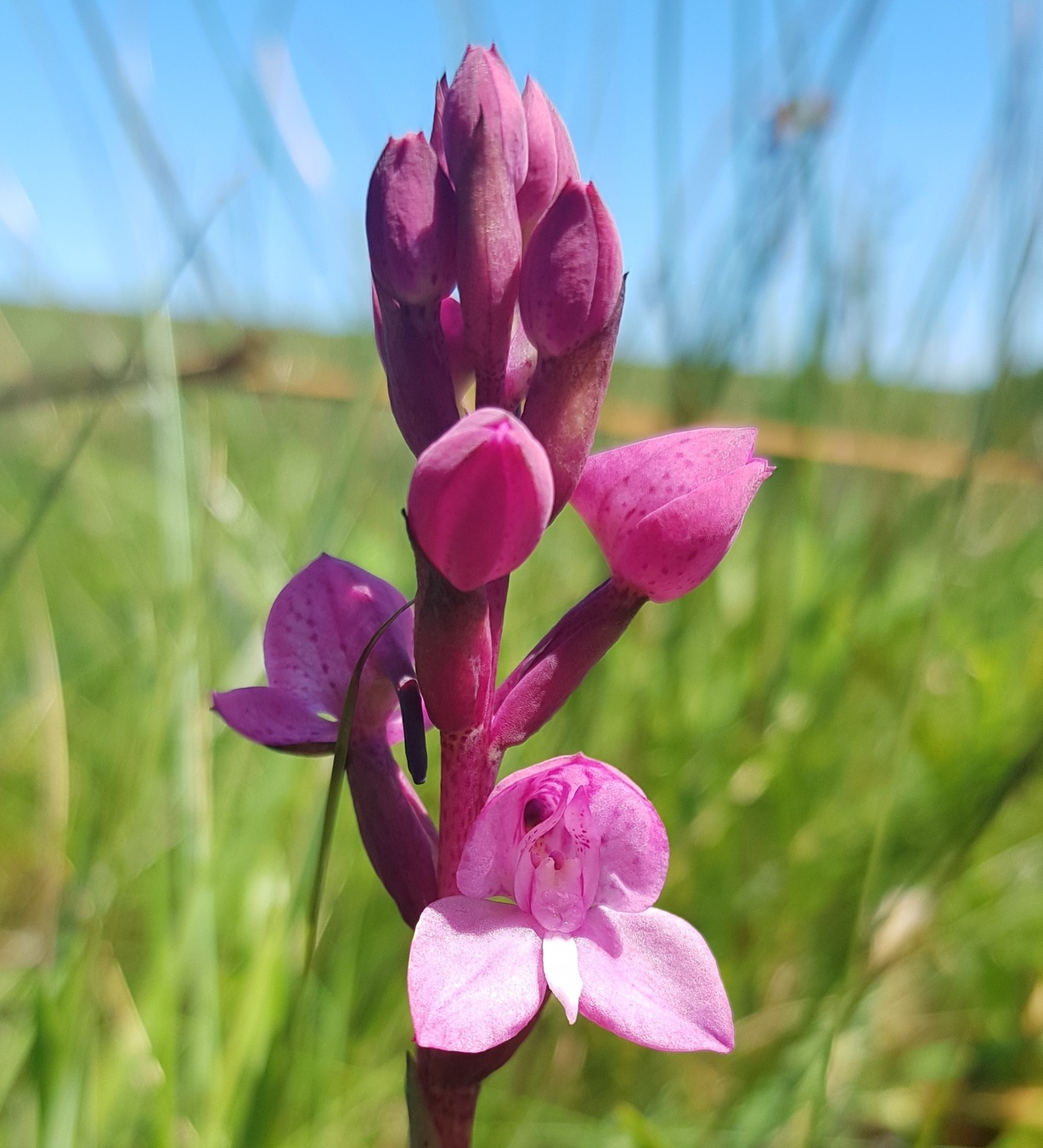
Disa afra

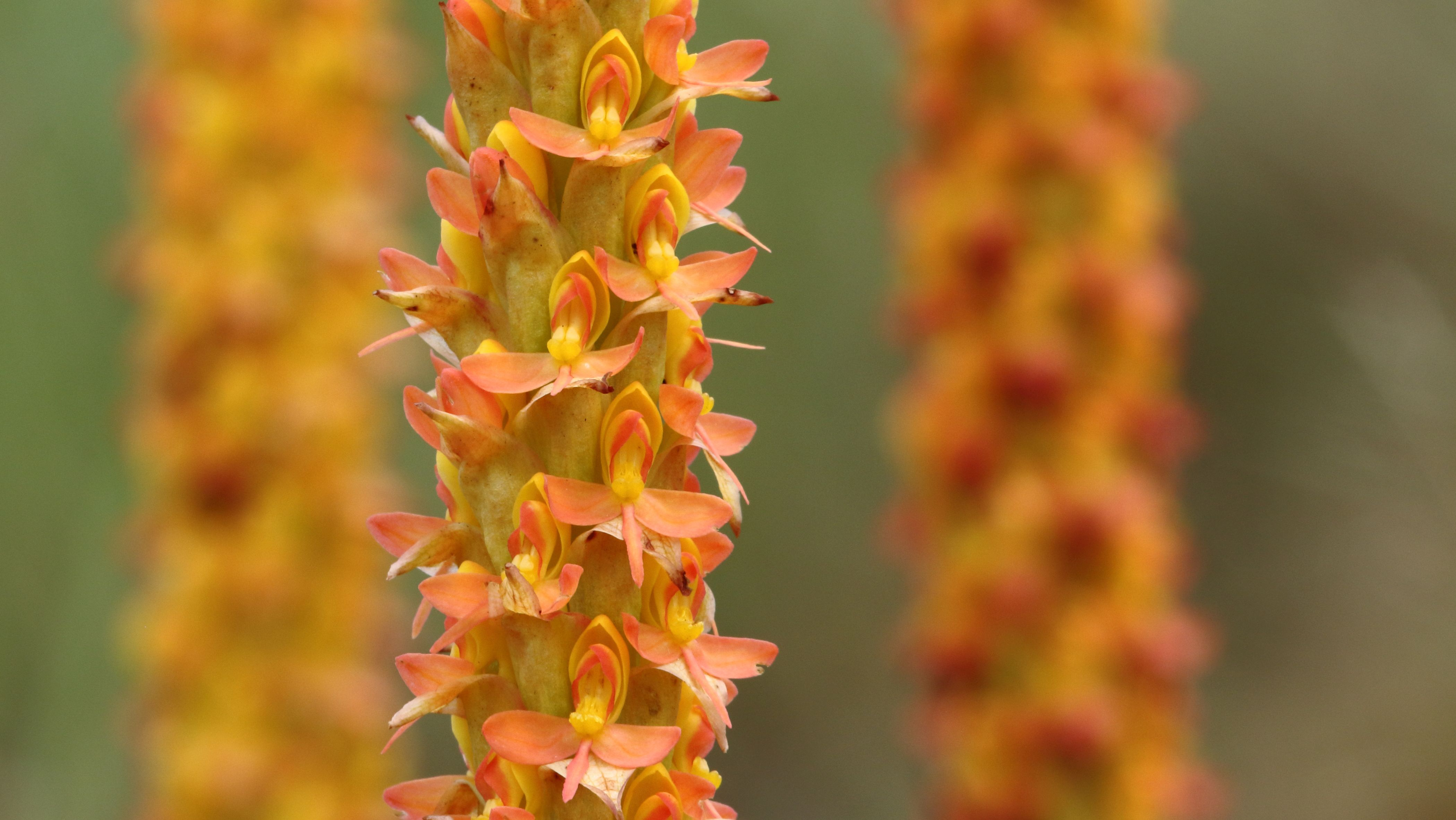
Disa chrysostachya

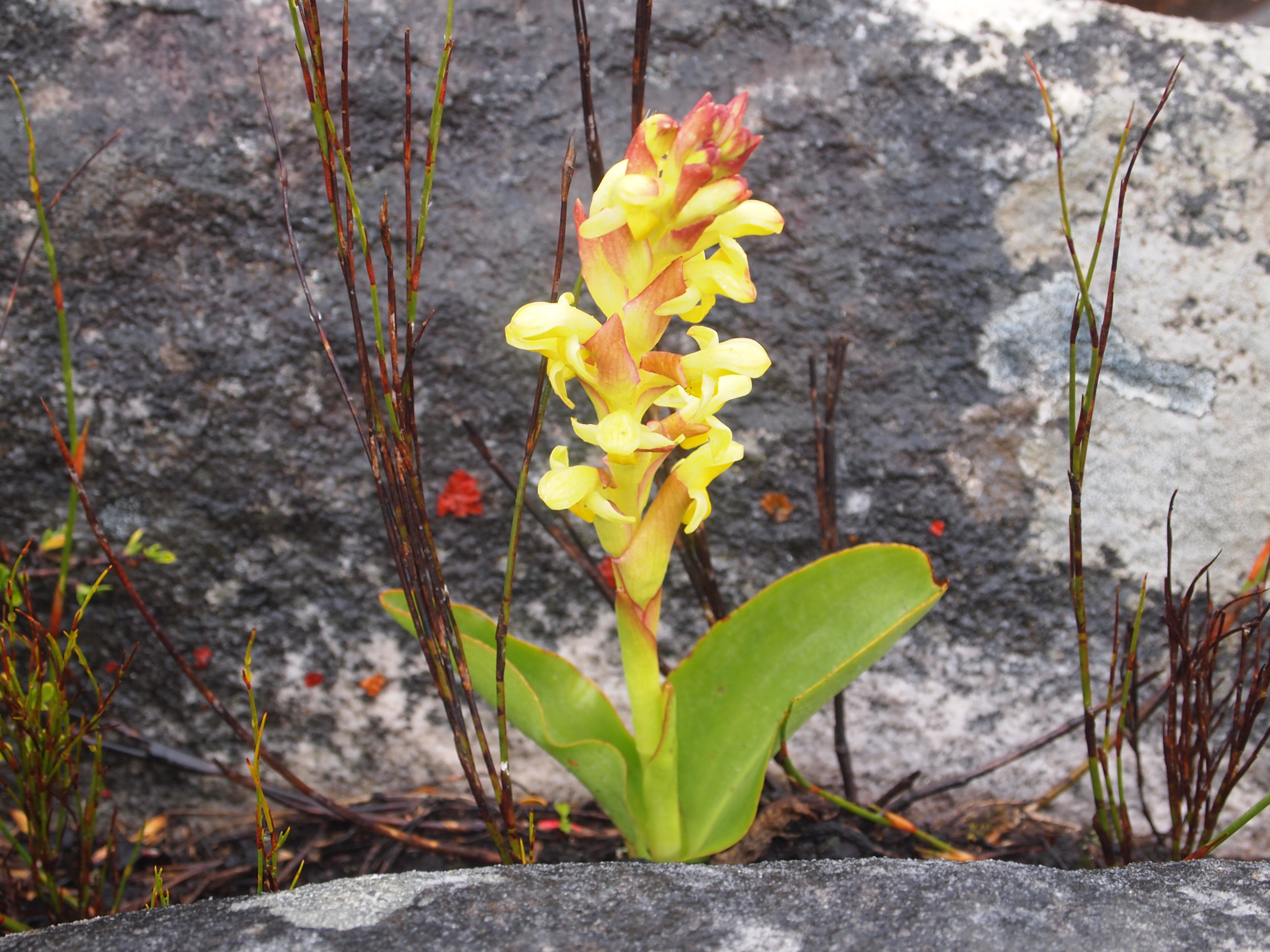
Disa comosa

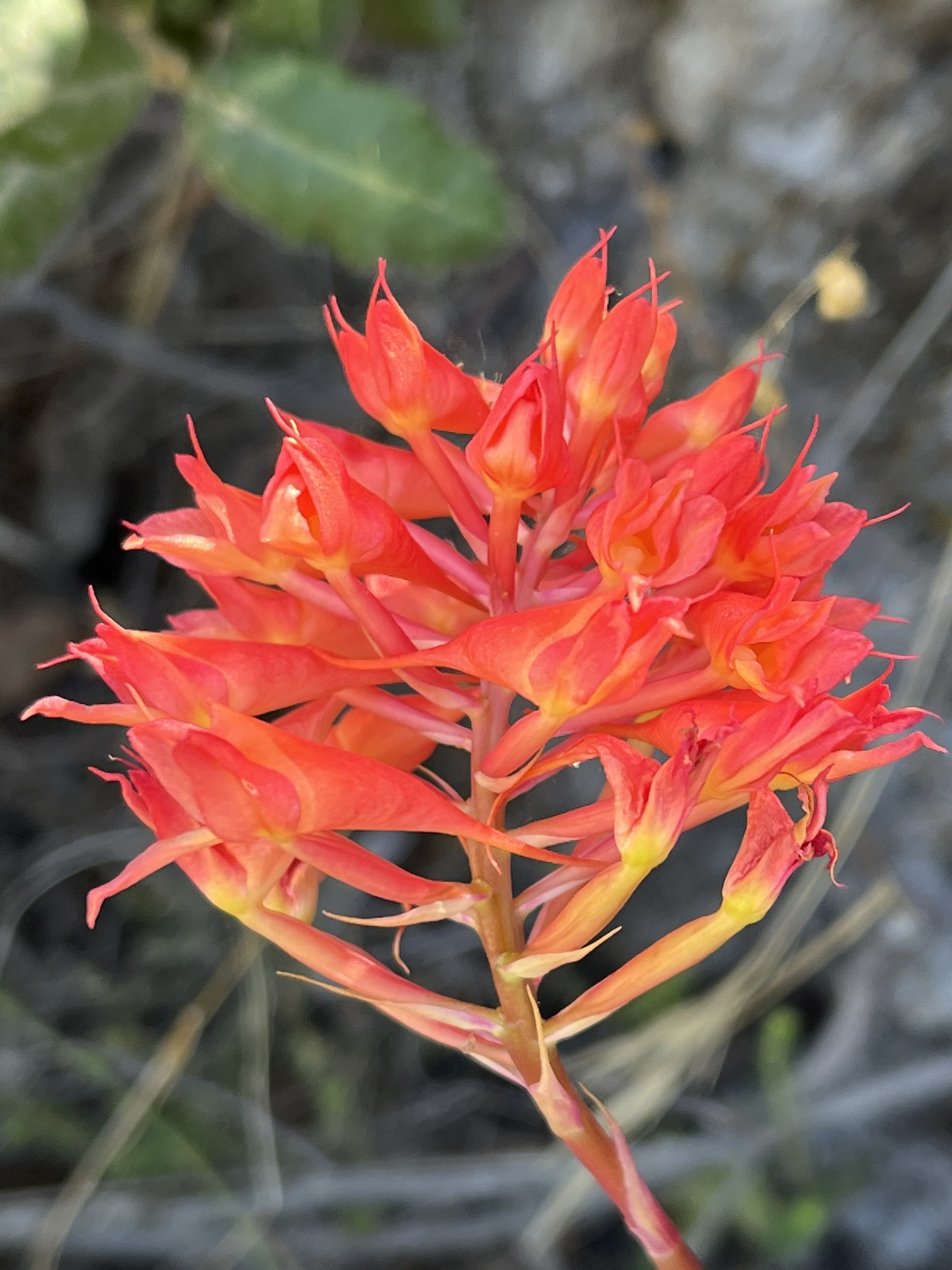
Disa ferruginea

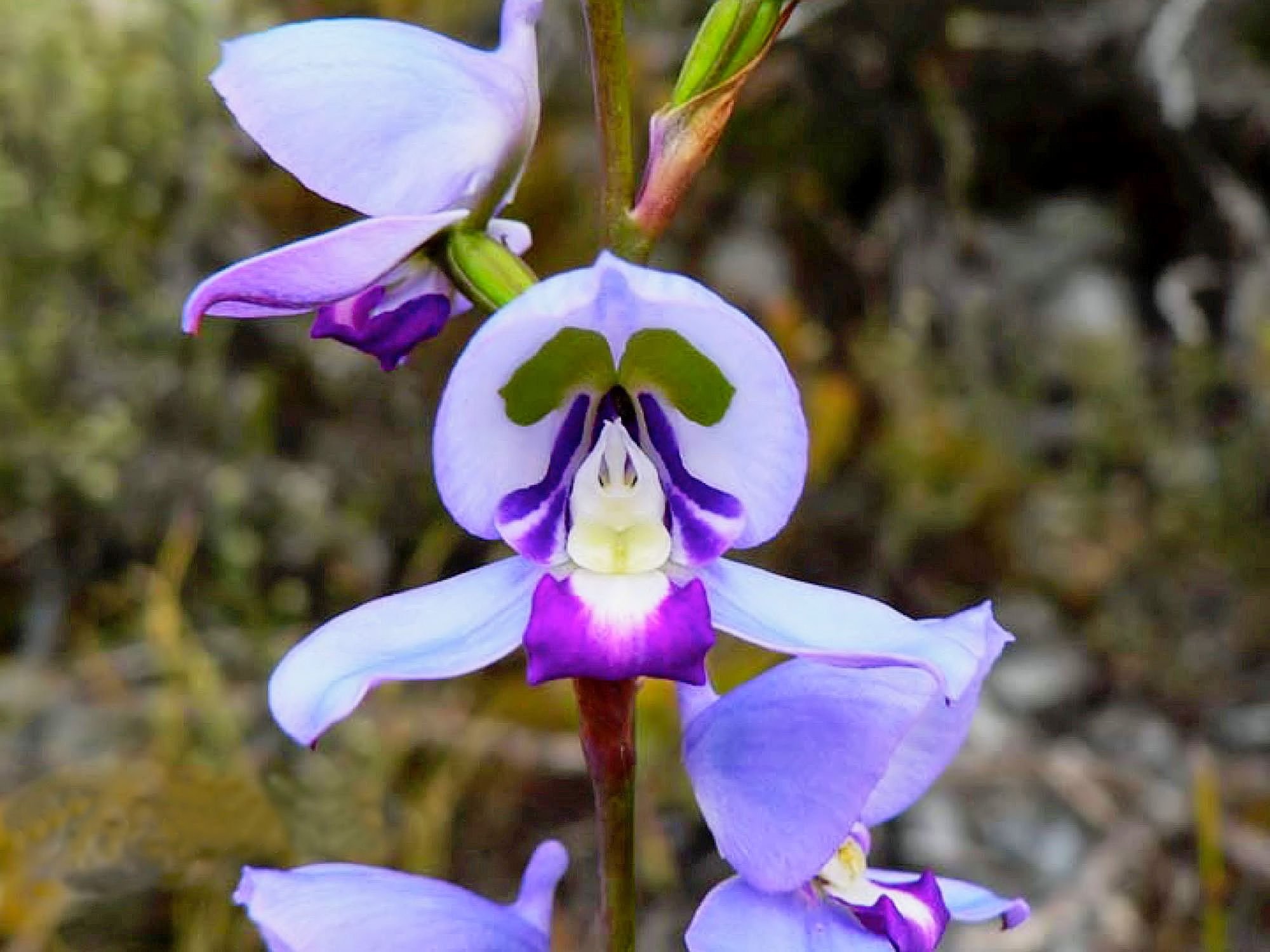
Disa graminifolia

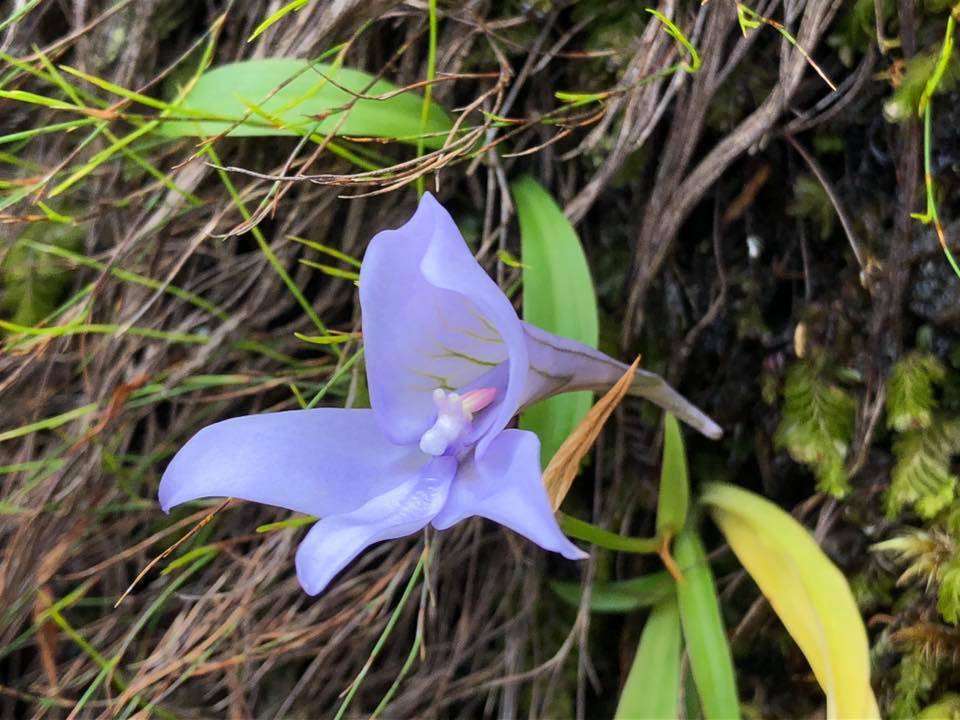
Disa longicornu

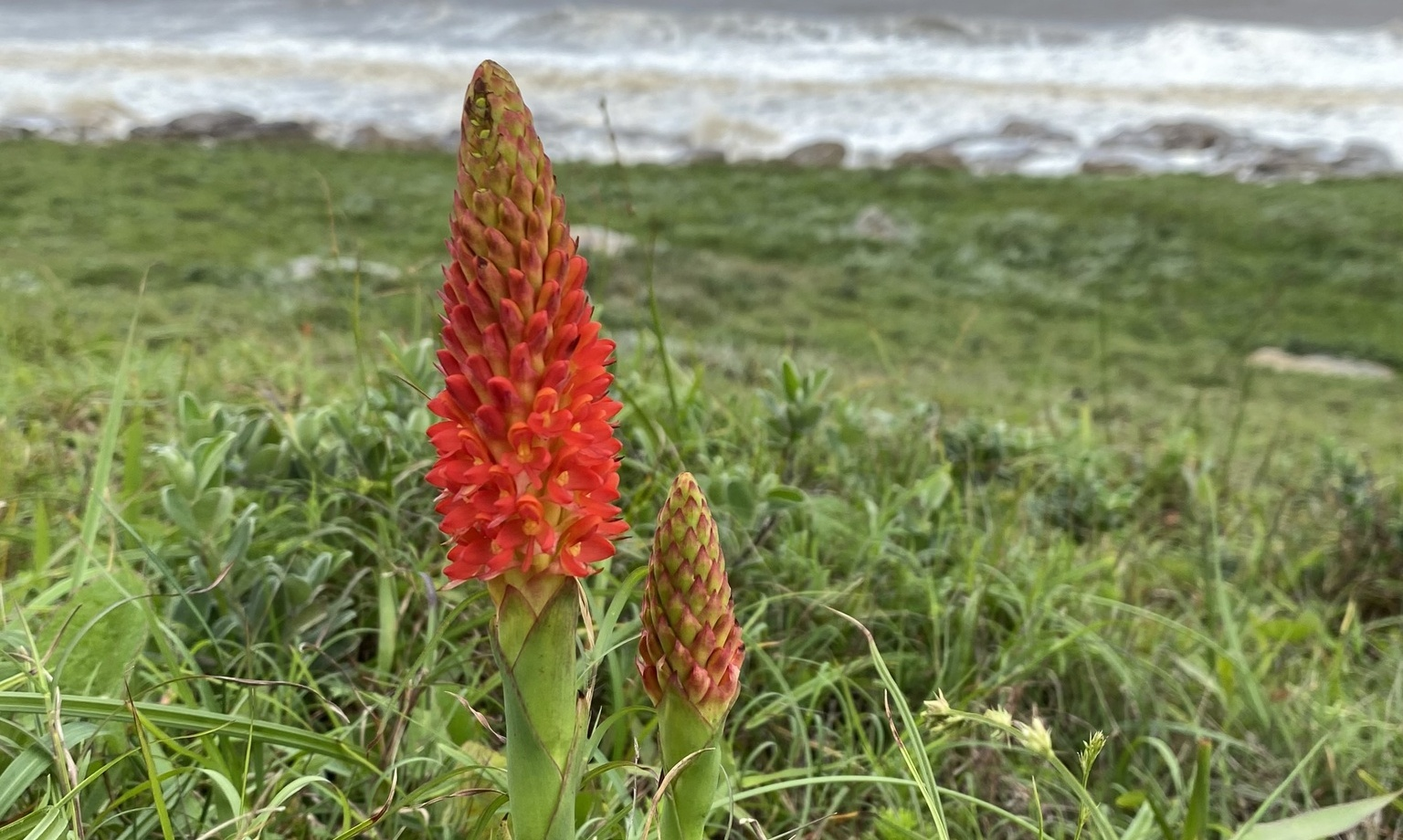
Disa polygonoides

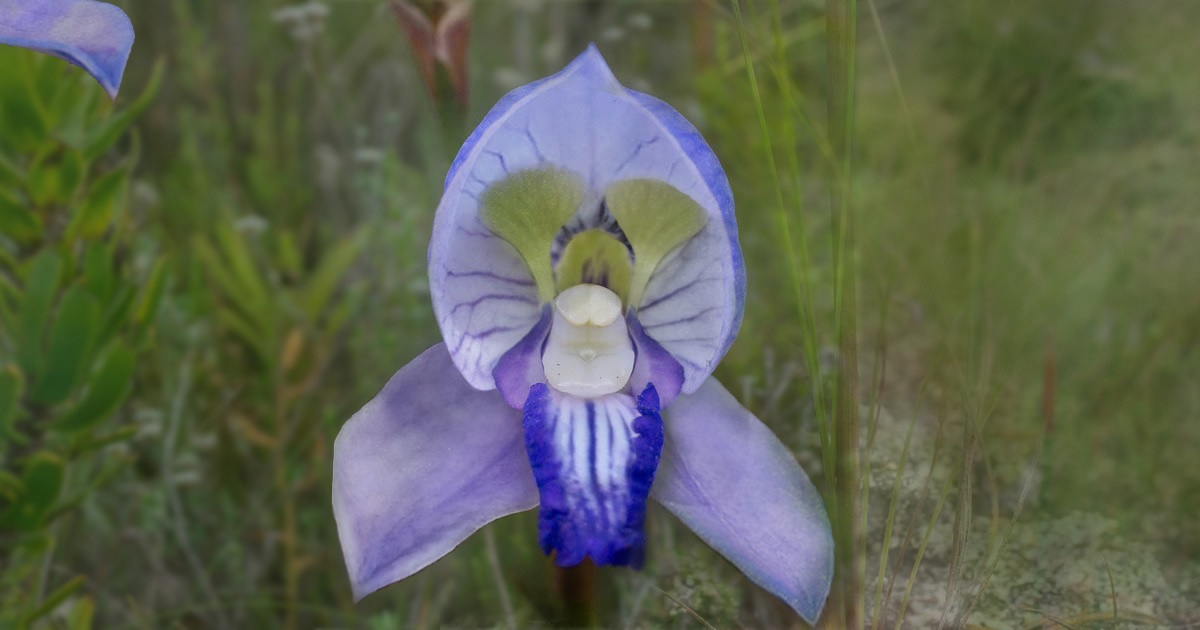
Disa purpurascens

Species currently (May 2014) recognized:

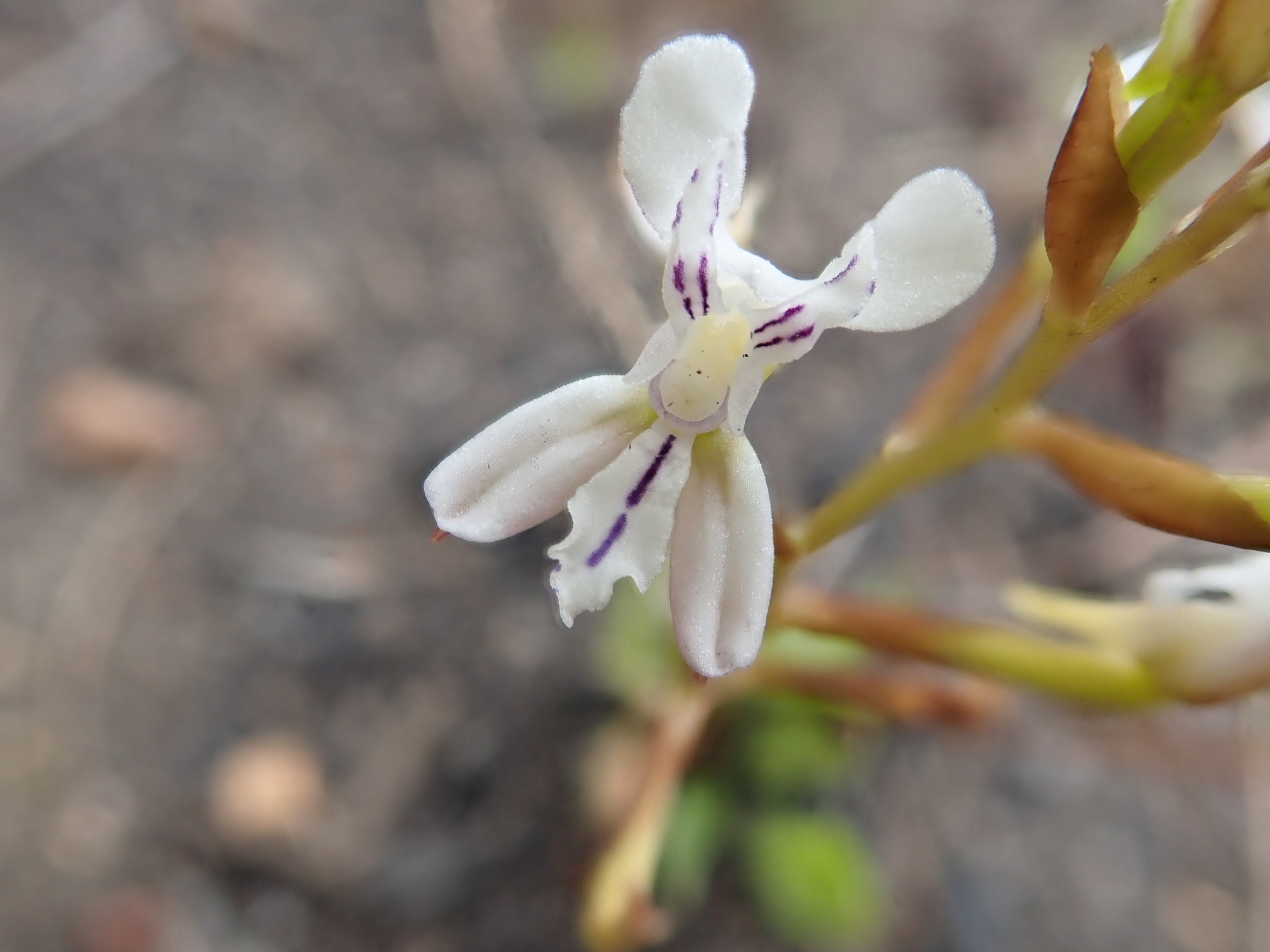
- Disa sagittalis
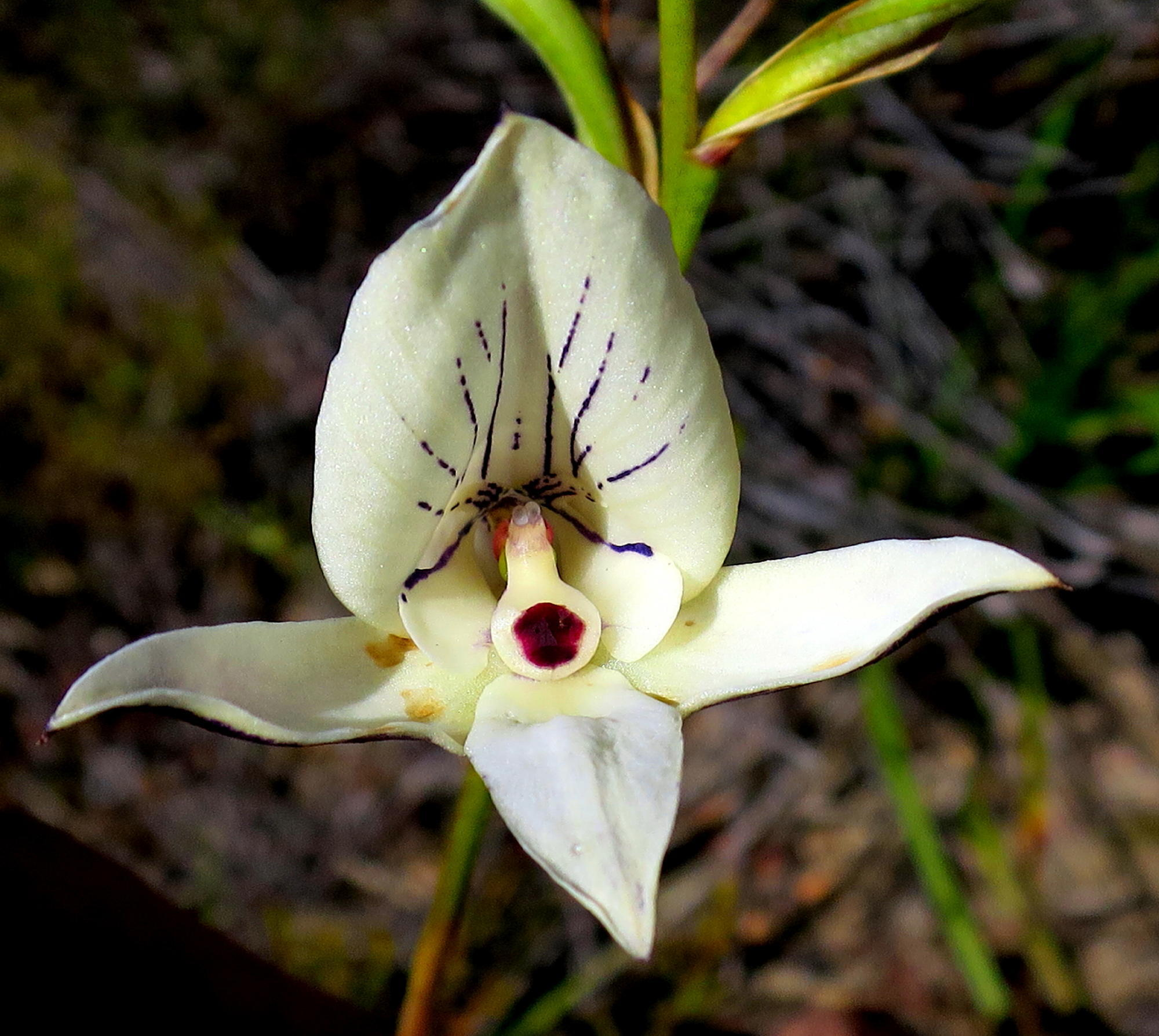
  Disa schlechteriana
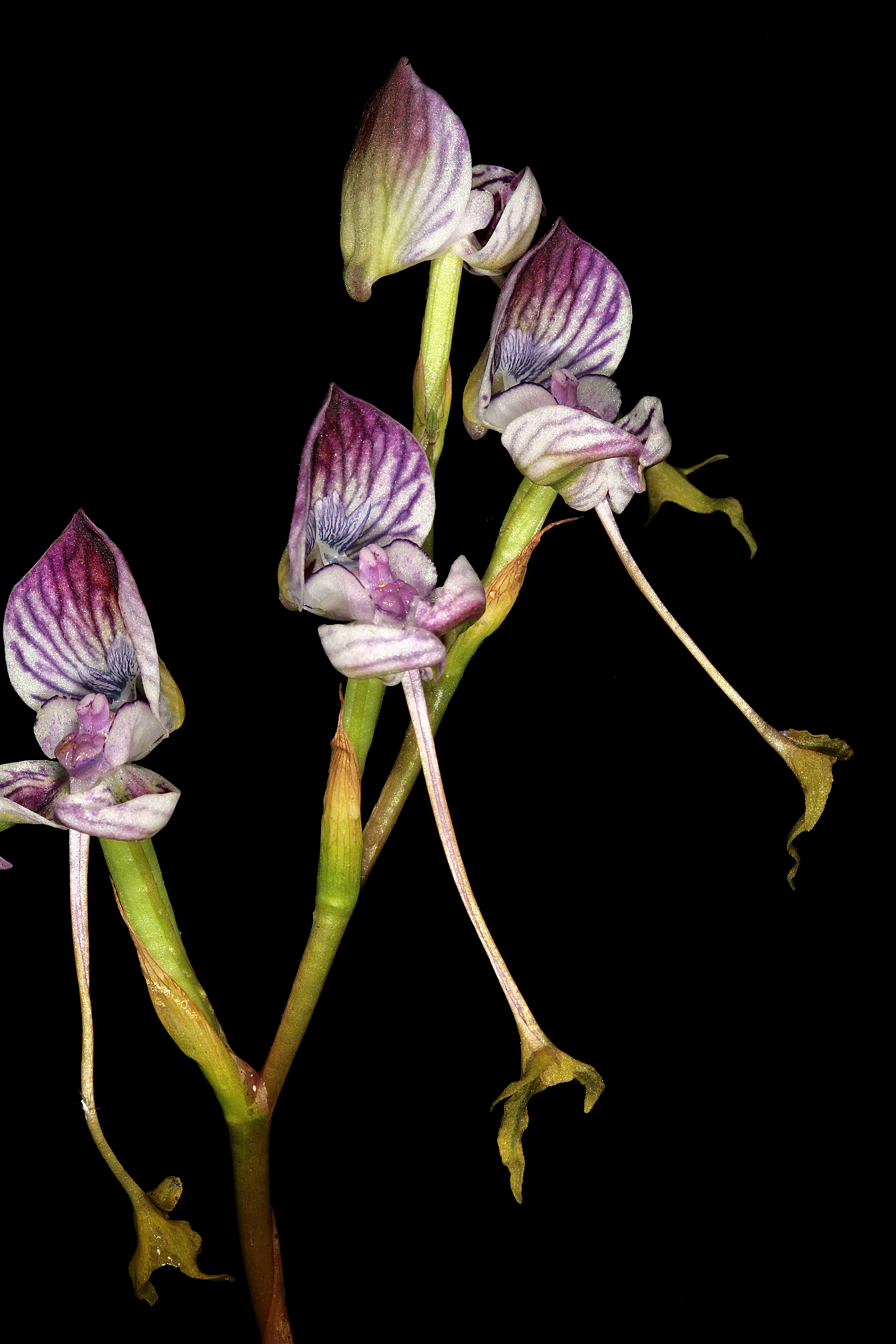
  Disa spathulata
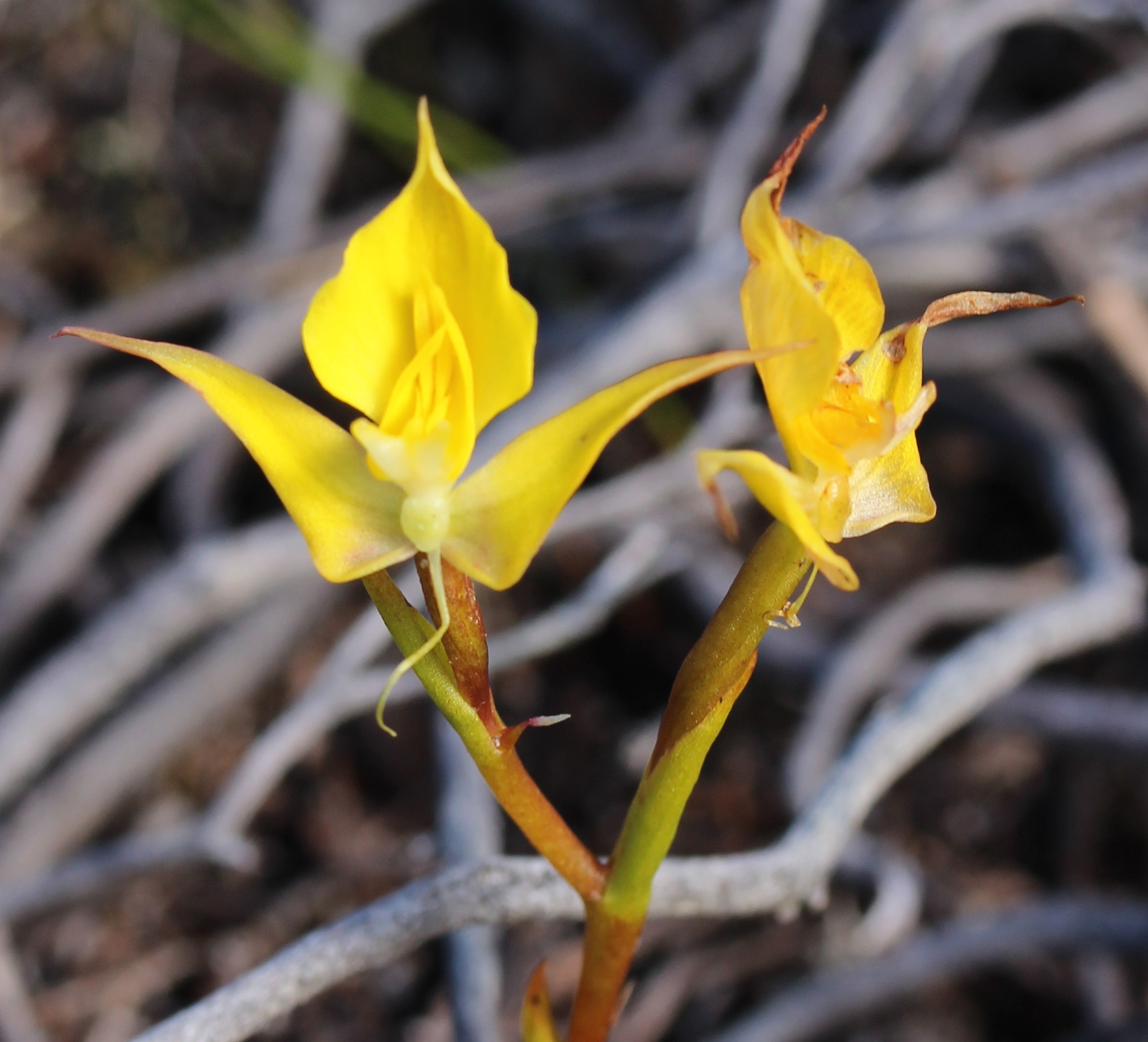
  Disa tenuifolia
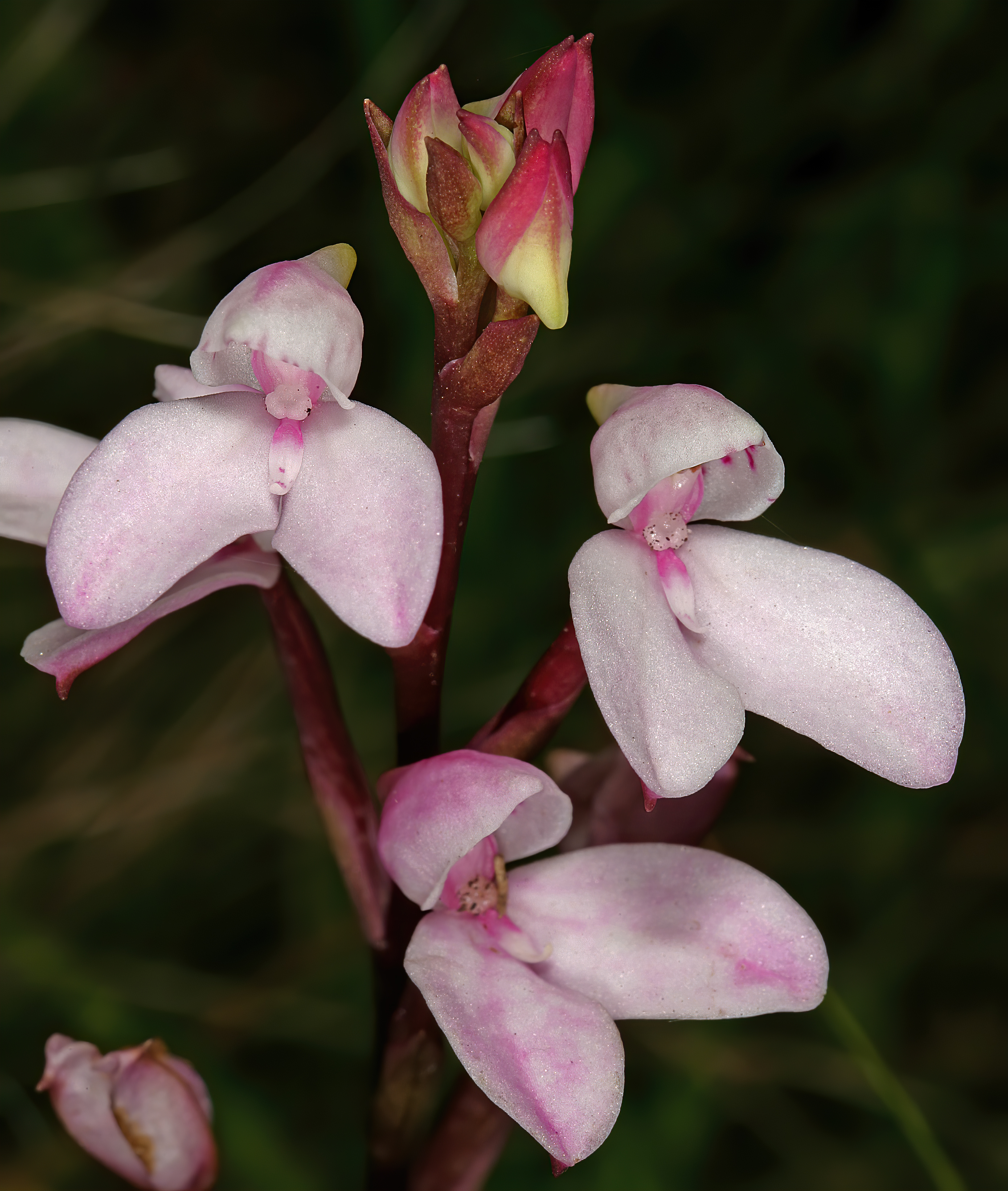
  Disa tripetaloides
  Disa aconitoides (Ethiopia to S. Africa)
  - Disa aconitoides subsp. aconitoides (Ethiopia to S. Africa) Tuber geophyte
  - Disa aconitoides subsp. concinna (Congo to S. Trop. Africa) Tuber geophyte
  - Disa aconitoides subsp. goetzeana (Ethiopia to Tanzania) Tuber geophyte
- Disa aequiloba (SW. Tanzania to Angola)
- Disa afra (Southern Congo to S. Africa, Madagascar)
- Disa alinae (Congo)
- Disa alticola (Mpumalanga / East-Transvaal)
- Disa amoena (Mpumalanga / East-Transvaal)
- Disa andringitrana (SE. & S. Madagascar)
- Disa aperta (SW. & S. Tanzania to Zambia)
- Disa arida (South Africa, S. Cape Prov.)
- Disa aristata (S. Africa, Northern Prov.)
- Disa atricapilla (South Africa, SW. Cape Prov.)
- Disa atrorubens (South Africa, SW. Cape Prov.)
- Disa aurata (South Africa, Cape Prov. (Swellendam)
- Disa barbata (South Africa, SW. Cape Prov.)
- Disa basutorum (S. Africa (Drakensberg)
- Disa baurii (Tanzania to S. Africa)
- Disa begleyi (South Africa, SW. Cape Prov.)
- Disa bifida (South Africa, SW. & S. Cape Prov.)
- Disa biflora (South Africa, SW. & S. Cape Prov.)
- Disa bivalvata (South Africa, SW. & S. Cape Prov.)
- Disa bodkinii (South Africa, SW. & S. Cape Prov.)
- Disa bolusiana (South Africa, SW. Cape Prov.)
- Disa borbonica (Réunion)
- Disa brachyceras (South Africa, SW. Cape Prov.)
- Disa bracteata, formerly Monadenia bracteata (South Africa, SW. & S. Cape Prov.; naturalised in Australia)
- Disa brevicornis (S. Trop. & S. Africa)
- Disa brevipetala (South Africa, SW. Cape Prov.; Kleinmond area)
- Disa buchenaviana (C. & SE. Madagascar)
- Disa cardinalis (South Africa, S. Cape Prov.; Riversdale)
- Disa caulescens (South Africa, SW. Cape Prov.)
- Disa cedarbergensis (South Africa, Cape Prov.; Cedarberg)
- Disa celata (S. Tanzania to Angola)
- Disa cephalotes (S. Africa)
  - Disa cephalotes subsp. cephalotes (S. Africa) Tuber geophyte
  - Disa cephalotes subsp. frigida (Lesotho to KwaZulu-Natal) Tuber geophyte
- Disa cernua (South Africa, SW. & S. Cape Prov)
- Disa chimanimaniensis (Chimanimani Mts, Zimbabwe)
- Disa chrysostachya (S. Africa)
- Disa clavicornis (Mpumalanga / East-Transvaal)
- Disa cochlearis (South Africa, Cape Prov.; Elandsberg)
- Disa comosa (South Africa, SW. & S. Cape Prov.)
- Disa conferta (South Africa, SW. Cape Prov.)
- Disa cooperi (S. Africa)
- Disa cornuta (Zimbabwe to S. Africa)
- Disa crassicornis (S. Africa)
- Disa cryptantha (Ethiopia, S. Tanzania to Zambia)
- Disa cylindrica (South Africa, SW. & S. Cape Prov.)
- Disa danielae (S. Congo)
- Disa darrenida (South Africa)
- Disa densiflora (South Africa, SW. & S. Cape Prov.)
- Disa dichroa (S. Congo to Zambia)
- Disa dracomontana (S. Africa (C. Drakensberg)
- Disa draconis (South Africa, SW. Cape Prov.)
- Disa ecalcarata (South Africa, SW. Cape Prov.; Constantiaberg)
- Disa elegans (South Africa, SW. Cape Prov.)
- Disa eminii (Rwanda to Zambia)
- Disa engleriana (Tanzania to Zambia)
- Disa equestris (Trop. Africa)
- Disa erubescens (Trop. Africa)
  - Disa erubescens subsp. carsonii (Tanzania to Zambia)
  - Disa erubescens subsp. erubescens (Trop. Africa) Tuber geophyte
- Disa esterhuyseniae (South Africa, WSW. Cape Prov.)
- Disa extinctoria (South Africa; Northern Prov., Eswatini)
- Disa facula (Ethiopia)
- Disa fasciata (South Africa, SW. & S. Cape Prov.)
- Disa ferruginea (South Africa, SW. Cape Prov.)
- Disa filicornis (South Africa, SW. & S. Cape Prov.)
- Disa flexuosa (South Africa SW. & S. Cape Prov.)
- Disa forcipata (South Africa, Cape Prov.; Possibly extinct)
- Disa forficaria (South Africa, SW. Cape Prov.)
- Disa fragrans (Ethiopia to S. Africa)
  - Disa fragrans subsp. deckenii (NE. & E. Trop. Africa to Congo) Tuber geophyte
  - Disa fragrans subsp. fragrans (Tanzania to S. Africa) Tuber geophyte
- Disa galpinii (South Africa, E. Cape Prov. to KwaZulu-Natal)
- Disa gladioliflora (South Africa, S. Cape Prov.)
  - Disa gladioliflora subsp. capricornis (South Africa, S. Cape Prov.) Tuber geophyte
  - Disa gladioliflora subsp. gladioliflora (South Africa, S. Cape Prov.) Tuber geophyte
- Disa glandulosa (South Africa, SW. & S. Cape Prov.)
- Disa graminifolia (South Africa, SW. & S. Cape Prov.)
- Disa hallackii (South Africa, SW. & S. Cape Prov.)
- Disa harveyana (South Africa, SW. Cape Prov.)
  - Disa harveyana subsp. harveyana (South Africa, SW. Cape Prov.) Tuber geophyte
  - Disa harveyana subsp. longicalcarata (South Africa, SW. Cape Prov.) Tuber geophyte
- Disa helenae (Zambia)
- Disa hians (South Africa, S. Cape Prov.)
- Disa hircicornis (Trop. & S. Africa)
- Disa incarnata (C. & SE. Madagascar)
- Disa inflexa (South Africa, S. Cape Prov.)
- Disa intermedia (South Africa, Eswatini)
- Disa introrsa (South Africa, SW. Cape Prov.; Skurweberge)
- Disa karooica (South Africa, NW. & C. Cape Prov.)
- Disa katangensis (S. Congo to Angola)
- Disa linderiana (South Africa, W. Cape Prov.)
- Disa lineata (South Africa, SW. Cape Prov.)
- Disa lisowskii (Congo)
- Disa longicornu (South Africa, SW. Cape Prov.)
- Disa longifolia (South Africa, SW. Cape Prov.)
- Disa longilabris (SW. Tanzania to N. Malawi)
- Disa lugens (South Africa, SW. & S. Cape Prov.)
  - Disa lugens var. lugens (South Africa, SW. & S. Cape Prov.) Tuber geophyte
  - Disa lugens var. nigrescens (South Africa, S. Cape Prov.; Oyster Bay) Tuber geophyte
- Disa macrostachya (South Africa W. Cape Prov.; Rooiberg)
- Disa maculata (South Africa, SW. Cape Prov.)
- Disa marlothii (South Africa, SW. & S. Cape Prov.)
- Disa micropetala (South Africa, SW. & S. Cape Prov.)
- Disa miniata (SW. Tanzania to S. Trop. Africa)
- Disa minor (South Africa, SW. Cape Prov.)
- Disa montana (South Africa, E. Cape Prov.)
- Disa multifida (South Africa, SW. Cape Prov.)
- Disa neglecta (South Africa, SW. Cape Prov.; Worcester)
- Disa nervosa (S. Africa)
- Disa newdigateae (South Africa, S. Cape Prov.; Knysna area)
- Disa nigerica (Nigeria to Congo)
- Disa nivea (S. Africa, S. Drakensberg)
- Disa nubigena (South Africa, SW. Cape Prov.; Devils Peak)
- Disa nyikensis (Malawi to Zambia)
- Disa obliqua (South Africa, SW. Cape Prov.)
- Disa obtusa (South Africa, SW. & S. Cape Prov.)
  - Disa obtusa subsp. hottentotica (South Africa, SW. Cape Prov.) Tuber geophyte
  - Disa obtusa subsp. obtusa (South Africa, SW. Cape Prov.) Tuber geophyte
  - Disa obtusa subsp. picta (South Africa, S. Cape Prov.) Tuber geophyte
- Disa ocellata (South Africa, SW. Cape Prov.)
- Disa ochrostachya (Cameroon to Tanzania and S. Trop. Africa)
- Disa oligantha (South Africa, SW. Cape Prov.)
- Disa ophrydea (South Africa, SW. & S. Cape Prov.)
- Disa oreophila (S. Africa)
  - Disa oreophila subsp. erecta (South Africa, S. Africa; Drakensberg) Tuber geophyte
  - Disa oreophila subsp. oreophila (S. Africa.) Tuber geophyte
- Disa ornithantha (SW. Tanzania to S. Trop. Africa)
- Disa ovalifolia (South Africa, WSW. Cape Prov.)
- Disa patula (Zimbabwe to S. Africa)
  - Disa patula var. patula (South Africa, E. Cape Prov. to Mpumalanga / East-Transvaal) Tuber geophyte
  - Disa patula var. transvaalensis (Zimbabwe to S. Africa) Tuber geophyte
- Disa perplexa (Nigeria, E. & S. Trop. Africa)
- Disa physodes (South Africa, SW. Cape Prov.)
- Disa pillansii (South Africa, SW. Cape Prov.)
- Disa polygonoides (Mozambique to S. Africa)
- Disa porrecta (S. Africa)
- Disa praecox (S. Trop. Africa; Nyika Plateau)
- Disa pulchella (Ethiopia, Yemen)
- Disa pulchra (S. Africa)
- Disa purpurascens (South Africa, SW. Cape Prov.)
- Disa pygmaea (South Africa, SW. Cape Prov.)
- Disa racemosa (South Africa, SW. & S. Cape Prov.)
- Disa renziana (Congo)
- Disa reticulata (South Africa, SW. & S. Cape Prov.)
- Disa rhodantha (Zimbabwe to S. Africa)
- Disa richardiana (South Africa, SW. Cape Prov.)
- Disa robusta (EC. Trop. Africa)
- Disa roeperocharoides (S. Congo to Zambia)
- Disa rosea (South Africa, SW. Cape Prov.)
- Disa rufescens (South Africa, SW. Cape Prov.)
- Disa rungweensis (SW. Tanzania to Malawi)
- Disa sabulosa (South Africa, SW. Cape Prov.)
- Disa sagittalis (South Africa, S. & SE. Cape Prov. to S. KwaZulu-Natal)
- Disa salteri (South Africa, SW. Cape Prov)
- Disa sanguinea (South Africa, E. Cape Prov. to S. KwaZulu-Natal)
- Disa sankeyi (S. Africa)
- Disa satyriopsis (Tanzania to Zambia)
- Disa saxicola (Tanzania to S. Africa)
- Disa schizodioides (South Africa, S. Cape Prov.)
- Disa schlechteriana (South Africa, SSW. Cape Prov.; Langeberg)
- Disa scullyi (South Africa, E. Cape Prov. S. KwaZulu)
- Disa scutellifera (NE. & E. Trop. Africa)
- Disa similis (S. Trop. & S. Africa)
- Disa spathulata (South Africa, Cape Prov.)
  - Disa spathulata subsp. spathulata (South Africa, Cape Prov.) Tuber geophyte
  - Disa spathulata subsp. tripartita (South Africa, SW. Cape Prov.) Tuber geophyte
- Disa stachyoides (S. Africa)
- Disa stairsii (NE. Congo to E. Trop. Africa)
- Disa stricta (S. Africa)
- Disa subtenuicornis (South Africa, Cape Prov.; Riversdale)
- Disa telipogonis (South Africa, SW. Cape Prov.)
- Disa tenella (South Africa, Cape Prov.)
  - Disa tenella subsp. pusilla (South Africa, W. Cape Prov.) Tuber geophyte
  - Disa tenella subsp. tenella (South Africa, SW. Cape Prov.) Tuber geophyte
- Disa tenuicornis (South Africa, SW. Cape Prov.)
- Disa tenuifolia (South Africa, SW. Cape Prov.)
- Disa tenuis (South Africa, SW. Cape Prov.)
- Disa thodei (S. Africa, Eastern Cape to Drakensberg)
- Disa triloba (South Africa, SW. Cape Prov)
- Disa tripetaloides (South Africa, SW. & S. Cape Prov. to S. KwaZulu-Natal)
- Disa tysonii (South Africa, S. & E. Cape Prov. to Leshoto)
- Disa ukingensis (S. Tanzania to E. Zambia)
- Disa uncinata (South Africa, SW. & S. Cape Prov.)
- Disa uniflora (South Africa, SW. Cape Prov.)
- Disa vaginata (South Africa, SW. & S. Cape Prov.)
- Disa vasselotii (South Africa, S. Cape Prov.)
- Disa venosa (South Africa, SW. Cape Prov.)
- Disa venusta (South Africa, SW. & E. Cape Prov.)
- Disa verdickii (S. Congo to Angola)
- Disa versicolor (S. Trop. & S. Africa)
- Disa virginalis (South Africa, SW. Cape Prov.)
- Disa walleri (Burundi to S. Trop. Africa)
- Disa walteri (SW. Tanzania)
- Disa welwitschii (Trop. & S. Africa)
  - Disa welwitschii subsp. occultans (Trop. Africa)
  - Disa welwitschii subsp. welwitschii (Trop. & S. Africa) Tuber geophyte
- Disa woodii (Zimbabwe to S. Africa)
- Disa zimbabweensis (Manicaland, Zimbabwe)
- Disa zombica (Tanzania to S. Trop. Africa)
- Disa zuluensis (Mpumalanga / East-Transvaal, KwaZulu-Natal)
