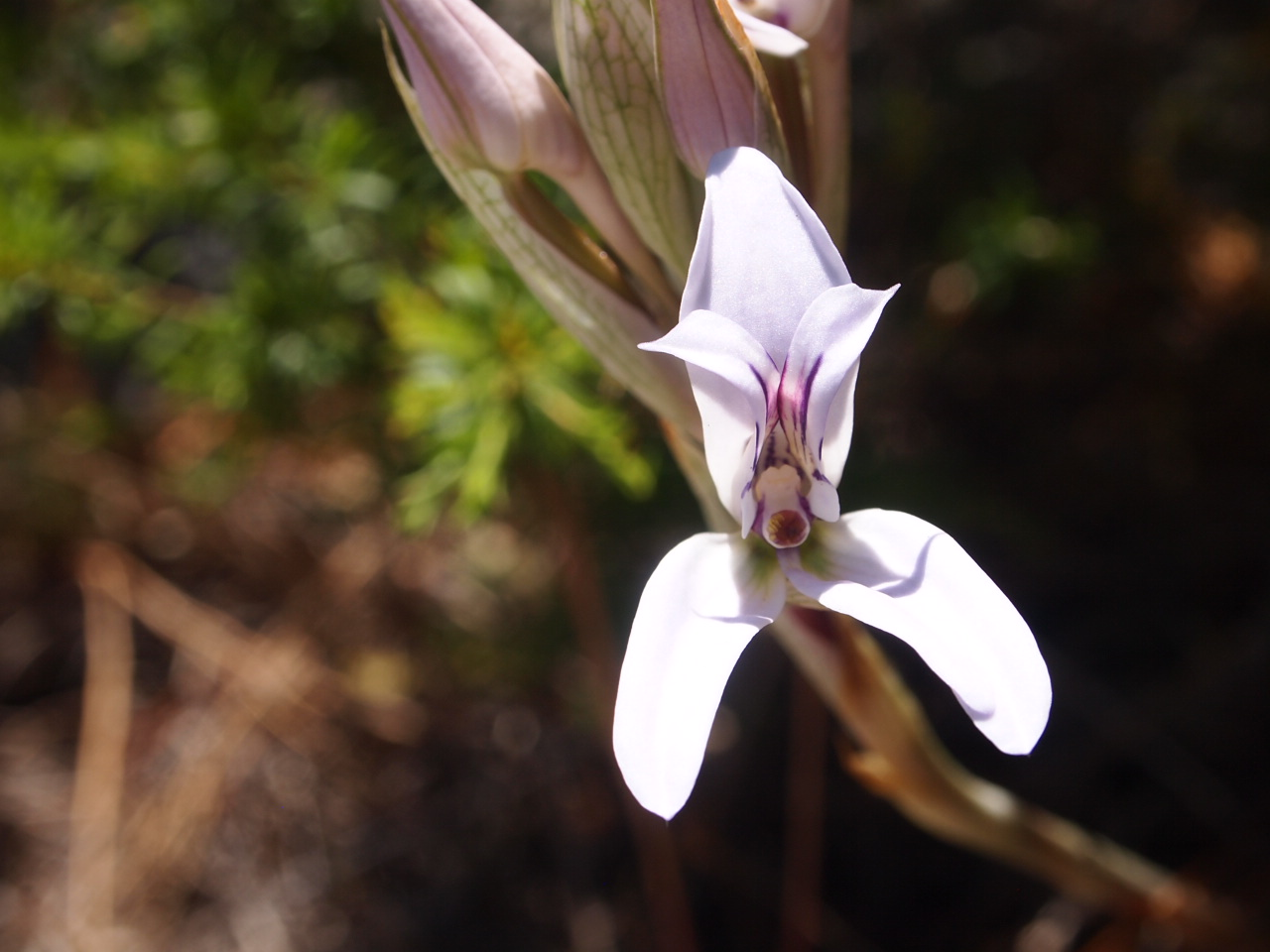

Scientific classification
- Kingdom: Plantae
- Clade: Tracheophytes
- Clade: Angiosperms
- Clade: Monocots
- Order: Asparagales
- Family: Orchidaceae
- Subfamily: Orchidoideae
- Genus: Disa
- Species: D. harveyana

Binomial name
- Disa harveyana Lindl.

= Disa harveyana =

Species of flowering plant

Disa harveyana is a perennial plant and geophyte belonging to the genus Disa and is part of the fynbos. The plant is endemic to the Western Cape.

There are two subspecies:

- Disa harveyana subsp. harveyana
- Disa harveyana subsp. longicalcarata S.D.Johnson & H.P.Linder
