= Disa fragrans =

Scientific classification
- Kingdom: Plantae
- Clade: Tracheophytes
- Clade: Angiosperms
- Clade: Monocots
- Order: Asparagales
- Family: Orchidaceae
- Subfamily: Orchidoideae
- Genus: Disa
- Species: D. fragrans

Binomial name
- Disa fragrans Schltr.

Species of flowering plant

Disa fragrans, the fragrant disa, is a perennial plant and geophyte belonging to the genus Disa. The plant is native to the Democratic Republic of the Congo, Ethiopia, Kenya, Lesotho, Malawi, Mozambique, Rwanda, Sudan, Tanzania, Uganda and Zimbabwe. In South Africa, the plant occurs in KwaZulu-Natal, Limpopo, Eastern Cape and Mpumalanga.

There are two subspecies:

- Disa fragrans subsp. deckenii (Rchb.f.) H.P.Linder
- Disa fragrans subsp. fragrans
