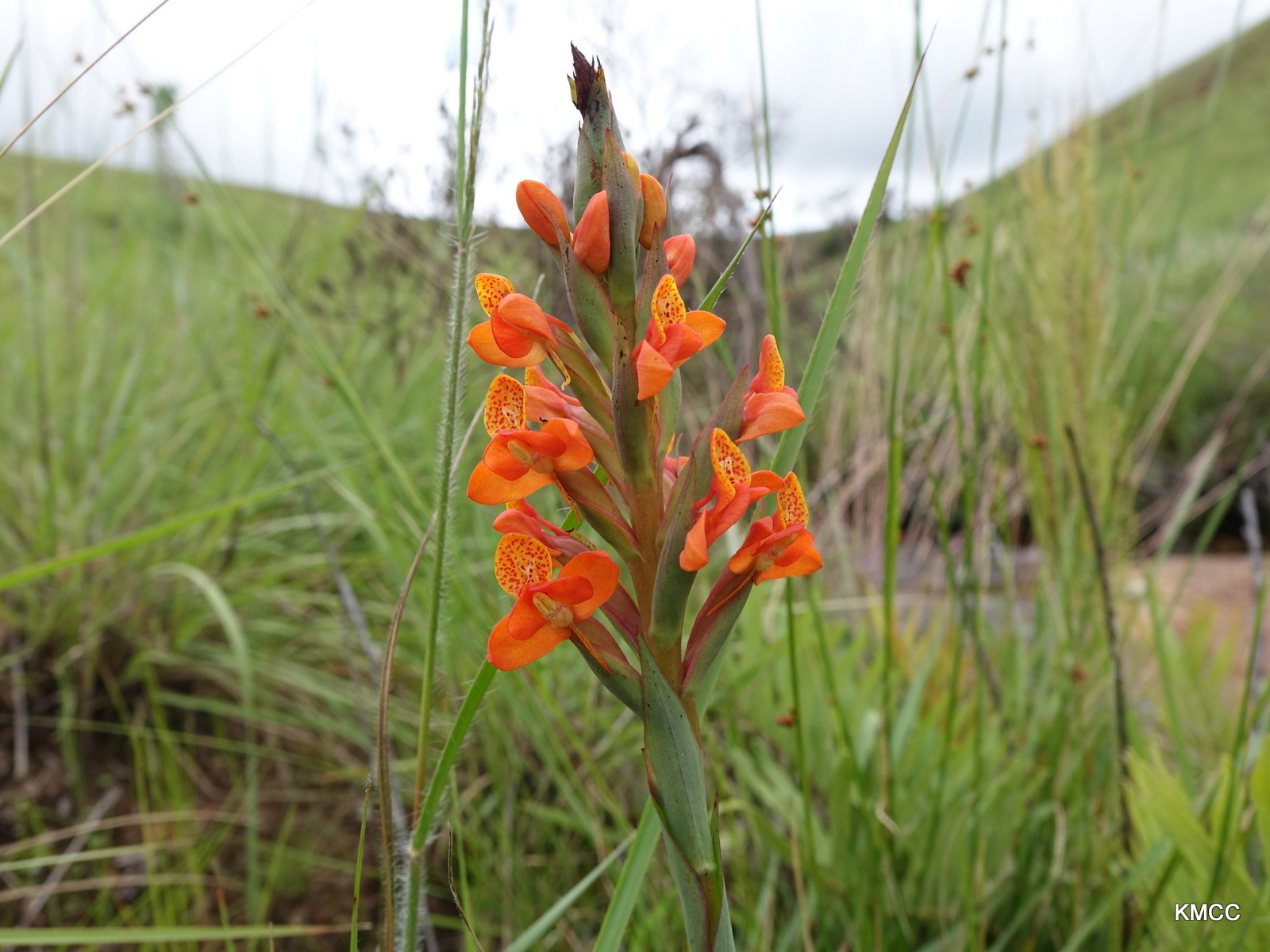

Scientific classification
- Kingdom: Plantae
- Clade: Tracheophytes
- Clade: Angiosperms
- Clade: Monocots
- Order: Asparagales
- Family: Orchidaceae
- Subfamily: Orchidoideae
- Genus: Disa
- Species: D. incarnata

Binomial name
- Disa incarnata Lindl.

Synonyms
- Disa fallax Kraenzl.

= Disa incarnata =

Species of flowering plant

Disa incarnata is a perennial plant and geophyte belonging to the genus Disa. The plant is endemic to central Madagascar.
