= Disa ukingensis =

Conservation status
- Data Deficient (IUCN 3.1)

Scientific classification
- Kingdom: Plantae
- Clade: Embryophytes
- Clade: Tracheophytes
- Clade: Spermatophytes
- Clade: Angiosperms
- Clade: Monocots
- Order: Asparagales
- Family: Orchidaceae
- Subfamily: Orchidoideae
- Genus: Disa
- Species: D. ukingensis

Binomial name
- Disa ukingensis Schltr.

Species of flowering plant in the orchid family

Disa ukingensis is a perennial plant and geophyte belonging to the genus Disa. The plant is native to Malawi, Tanzania and Zambia.
