= Disa robusta =

Scientific classification
- Kingdom: Plantae
- Clade: Tracheophytes
- Clade: Angiosperms
- Clade: Monocots
- Order: Asparagales
- Family: Orchidaceae
- Subfamily: Orchidoideae
- Genus: Disa
- Species: D. robusta

Binomial name
- Disa robusta N.E.Br.

Synonyms
- Disa coccinea Kraenzl.; Disa praestans Kraenzl.

Species of flowering plant

Disa robusta is a perennial plant and geophyte belonging to the genus Disa. The plant is native to Burundi, Democratic Republic of the Congo, Malawi, Rwanda, Tanzania and Zambia.
