= Disa pulchella =

Scientific classification
- Kingdom: Plantae
- Clade: Tracheophytes
- Clade: Angiosperms
- Clade: Monocots
- Order: Asparagales
- Family: Orchidaceae
- Subfamily: Orchidoideae
- Genus: Disa
- Species: D. pulchella

Binomial name
- Disa pulchella Hochst. ex A.Rich.

Species of flowering plant

Disa pulchella is a perennial plant and geophyte belonging to the genus Disa. The plant is native to Ethiopia and Yemen.
