= Disa eminii =

Scientific classification
- Kingdom: Plantae
- Clade: Embryophytes
- Clade: Tracheophytes
- Clade: Angiosperms
- Clade: Monocots
- Order: Asparagales
- Family: Orchidaceae
- Subfamily: Orchidoideae
- Genus: Disa
- Species: D. eminii

Binomial name
- Disa eminii Kraenzl.

Synonyms
- Disa stolonifera Rendle

Species of flowering plant

Disa eminii is a perennial plant and geophyte belonging to the genus Disa. The plant is native to Burundi, Rwanda, Tanzania, Uganda and Zambia.
