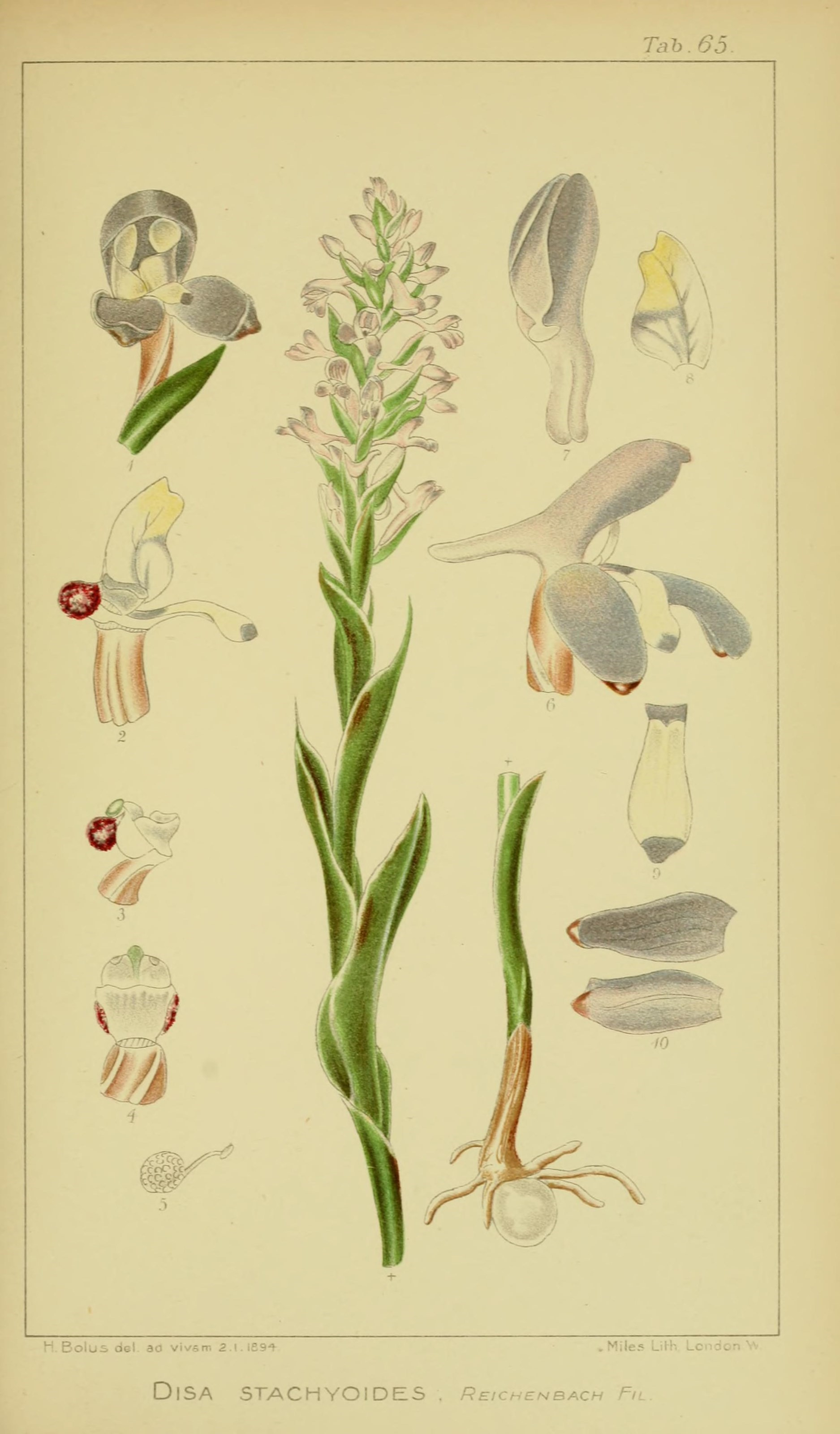

Scientific classification
- Kingdom: Plantae
- Clade: Tracheophytes
- Clade: Angiosperms
- Clade: Monocots
- Order: Asparagales
- Family: Orchidaceae
- Subfamily: Orchidoideae
- Genus: Disa
- Species: D. stachyoides

Binomial name
- Disa stachyoides Rchb.f.

Synonyms
- Monadenia leydenburgensis Kraenzl.

= Disa stachyoides =

Species of flowering plant

Disa stachyoides is a perennial plant and geophyte belonging to the genus Disa. The plant is native to Eswatini, KwaZulu-Natal, Lesotho, Limpopo, Mpumalanga, Eastern Cape and the Free State.
