= Disa longilabris =

Scientific classification
- Kingdom: Plantae
- Clade: Tracheophytes
- Clade: Angiosperms
- Clade: Monocots
- Order: Asparagales
- Family: Orchidaceae
- Subfamily: Orchidoideae
- Genus: Disa
- Species: D. longilabris

Binomial name
- Disa longilabris Schltr.

Synonyms
- Herschelia longilabris (Schltr.) Rolfe; Herschelianthe longilabris (Schltr.) Rauschert

Species of flowering plant

Disa longilabris, commonly known as the long lipped disa, is a perennial plant and geophyte belonging to the genus Disa. The plant is native to Malawi and Tanzania.
