= Disa equestris =

Scientific classification
- Kingdom: Plantae
- Clade: Tracheophytes
- Clade: Angiosperms
- Clade: Monocots
- Order: Asparagales
- Family: Orchidaceae
- Subfamily: Orchidoideae
- Genus: Disa
- Species: D. equestris

Binomial name
- Disa equestris Rchb.f.

Synonyms
- Disa huillensis Fritsch

Species of flowering plant

Disa equestris is a perennial plant and geophyte belonging to the genus Disa. The plant is native to Angola, Burundi, Democratic Republic of Congo, Cameroon, Malawi, Mozambique, Nigeria, Republic of Congo, Central African Republic, Tanzania, Zambia and Zimbabwe.
