= Disa buchenaviana =

Scientific classification
- Kingdom: Plantae
- Clade: Tracheophytes
- Clade: Angiosperms
- Clade: Monocots
- Order: Asparagales
- Family: Orchidaceae
- Subfamily: Orchidoideae
- Genus: Disa
- Species: D. buchenaviana

Binomial name
- Disa buchenaviana Kraenzl.

Synonyms
- Disa rutenbergiana Kraenzl.; Satyrium calceatum Ridl.

Species of flowering plant

Disa buchenaviana, the Buchenavi's disa, is a perennial plant and geophyte belonging to the genus Disa. The plant is endemic to central Madagascar.
