= Disa cryptantha =

Scientific classification
- Kingdom: Plantae
- Clade: Tracheophytes
- Clade: Angiosperms
- Clade: Monocots
- Order: Asparagales
- Family: Orchidaceae
- Subfamily: Orchidoideae
- Genus: Disa
- Species: D. cryptantha

Binomial name
- Disa cryptantha Summerh.

Species of flowering plant

Disa cryptantha, commonly known as the hidden disa, is a perennial plant and geophyte belonging to the genus Disa. The plant is native to Burundi, Democratic Republic of the Congo, Ethiopia, Malawi, Tanzania, Zambia and Zimbabwe.
