= Disa zimbabweensis =

Conservation status
- Vulnerable (IUCN 3.1)

Scientific classification
- Kingdom: Plantae
- Clade: Tracheophytes
- Clade: Angiosperms
- Clade: Monocots
- Order: Asparagales
- Family: Orchidaceae
- Subfamily: Orchidoideae
- Genus: Disa
- Species: D. zimbabweensis

Binomial name
- Disa zimbabweensis H.P.Linder

Synonyms
- Disa rungweensis subsp. rhodesiaca (Summerh.) Summerh.; Disa rungweensis var. rhodesiaca Summerh.

Species of flowering plant

Disa zimbabweensis is a perennial plant and geophyte belonging to the genus Disa. In South Africa, the plant is native to Mpumalanga. Outside South Africa, the plant is native to Mozambique and Zimbabwe.
