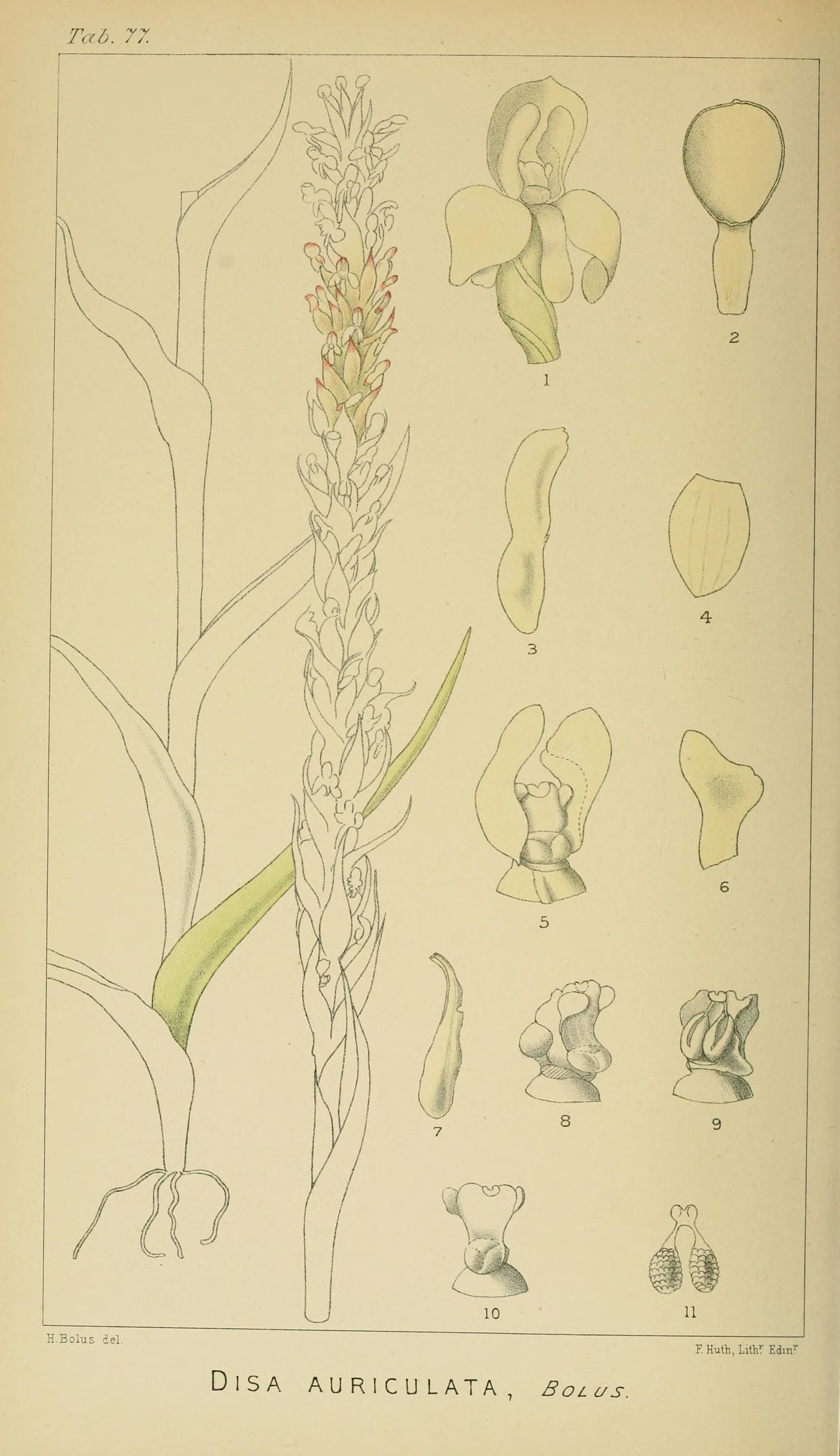

Scientific classification
- Kingdom: Plantae
- Clade: Tracheophytes
- Clade: Angiosperms
- Clade: Monocots
- Order: Asparagales
- Family: Orchidaceae
- Subfamily: Orchidoideae
- Genus: Disa
- Species: D. ochrostachya

Binomial name
- Disa ochrostachya Rchb.f.

Synonyms
- Disa adolphi-fridericii Kraenzl.; Disa aurantiaca Rchb.f.; Disa ochrostachya var. major Rendle

= Disa ochrostachya =

Species of flowering plant

Disa ochrostachya is a perennial plant and geophyte belonging to the genus Disa. The species occurs in Angola, Burundi, Democratic Republic of Congo, Cameroon, Kenya, Malawi, Republic of Congo, Rwanda, Sudan, Tanzania, Uganda, Zambia and Zimbabwe.
