= Disa scutellifera =

Scientific classification
- Kingdom: Plantae
- Clade: Tracheophytes
- Clade: Angiosperms
- Clade: Monocots
- Order: Asparagales
- Family: Orchidaceae
- Subfamily: Orchidoideae
- Genus: Disa
- Species: D. scutellifera

Binomial name
- Disa scutellifera A.Rich.

Synonyms
- Disa schimperi N.E.Br.

Species of flowering plant

Disa scutellifera is a perennial plant and geophyte belonging to the genus Disa. The plant is endemic to Ethiopia, Kenya, Sudan and Uganda.
