= Disa facula =

Conservation status
- Endangered (IUCN 3.1)

Scientific classification
- Kingdom: Plantae
- Clade: Tracheophytes
- Clade: Angiosperms
- Clade: Monocots
- Order: Asparagales
- Family: Orchidaceae
- Subfamily: Orchidoideae
- Genus: Disa
- Species: D. facula

Binomial name
- Disa facula P.J.Cribb, C.Herrm. & Sebsebe

Species of flowering plant

Disa facula is a perennial plant and geophyte belonging to the genus Disa. The plant is endemic to Ethiopia, where it occurs in the west.
