= Disa alinae =

Scientific classification
- Kingdom: Plantae
- Clade: Tracheophytes
- Clade: Angiosperms
- Clade: Monocots
- Order: Asparagales
- Family: Orchidaceae
- Subfamily: Orchidoideae
- Genus: Disa
- Species: D. alinae

Binomial name
- Disa alinae Szlach.

Species of flowering plant

Disa alinae is a perennial plant and geophyte belonging to the genus Disa. The plant is endemic to the Democratic Republic of the Congo.
