= Disa walteri =

Scientific classification
- Kingdom: Plantae
- Clade: Tracheophytes
- Clade: Angiosperms
- Clade: Monocots
- Order: Asparagales
- Family: Orchidaceae
- Subfamily: Orchidoideae
- Genus: Disa
- Species: D. walteri

Binomial name
- Disa walteri Schltr.

Synonyms
- Disa goetzeana (Kraenzl.) Schltr.; Herschelia goetzeana Kraenzl.; Herschelianthe goetzeana (Kraenzl.) Rauschert

Species of flowering plant

Disa walteri is a perennial plant and geophyte belonging to the genus Disa. The plant is endemic to Tanzania.
