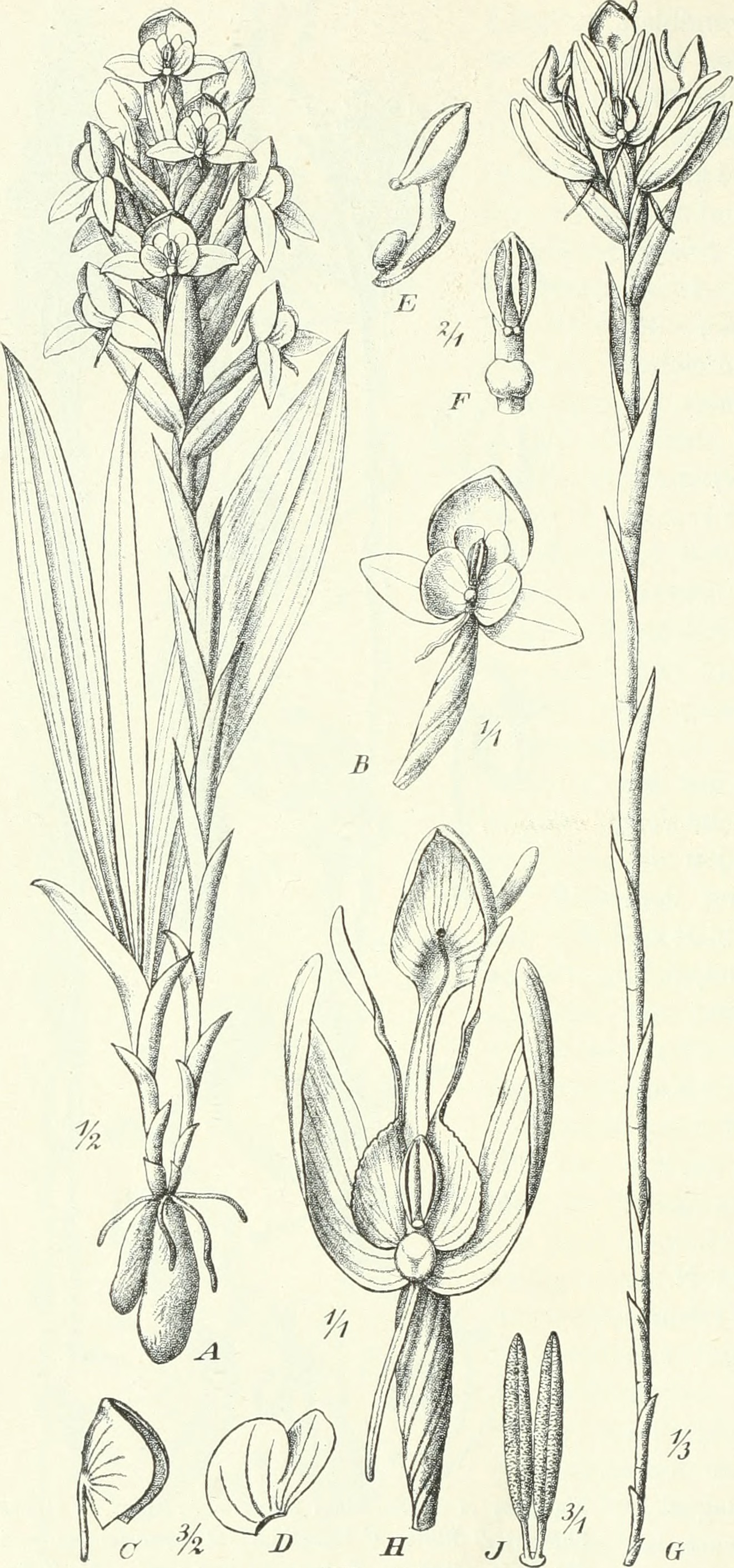

Scientific classification
- Kingdom: Plantae
- Clade: Embryophytes
- Clade: Tracheophytes
- Clade: Spermatophytes
- Clade: Angiosperms
- Clade: Monocots
- Order: Asparagales
- Family: Orchidaceae
- Subfamily: Orchidoideae
- Genus: Disa
- Species: D. engleriana

Binomial name
- Disa engleriana Kraenzl.

Synonyms
- Disa subscutellifera Kraenzl.

= Disa engleriana =

Species of flowering plant

Disa engleriana is a perennial plant and geophyte belonging to the genus Disa. The plant is native to Angola, Democratic Republic of the Congo, Malawi, Tanzania and Zambia.
