= Disa similis =

Scientific classification
- Kingdom: Plantae
- Clade: Tracheophytes
- Clade: Angiosperms
- Clade: Monocots
- Order: Asparagales
- Family: Orchidaceae
- Subfamily: Orchidoideae
- Genus: Disa
- Species: D. similis

Binomial name
- Disa similis Summerh.

Species of flowering plant

Disa similis is a perennial plant and geophyte belonging to the genus Disa. The plant is endemic to Angola, KwaZulu-Natal, Eastern Cape, and Zambia.
