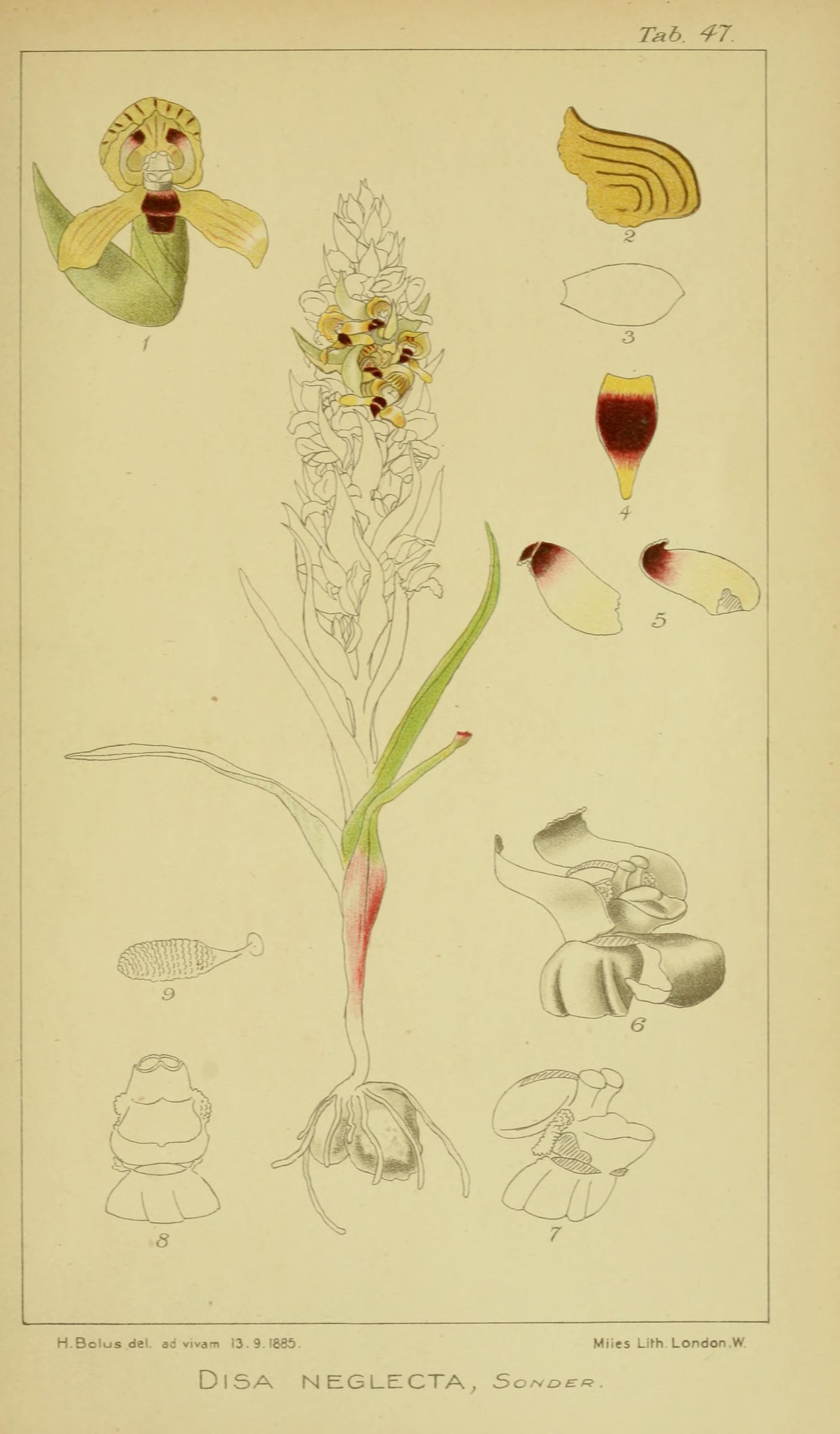

Scientific classification
- Kingdom: Plantae
- Clade: Tracheophytes
- Clade: Angiosperms
- Clade: Monocots
- Order: Asparagales
- Family: Orchidaceae
- Subfamily: Orchidoideae
- Genus: Disa
- Species: D. nivea

Binomial name
- Disa nivea H.P.Linder

= Disa nivea =

Species of flowering plant

Disa nivea is a perennial plant and geophyte belonging to the genus Disa and is part of the fynbos. The plant is native to Lesotho, the South African provinces of KwaZulu-Natal, and the Eastern Cape, and also occurs in the Drakensberg.
