= Disa ornithantha =

Scientific classification
- Kingdom: Plantae
- Clade: Tracheophytes
- Clade: Angiosperms
- Clade: Monocots
- Order: Asparagales
- Family: Orchidaceae
- Subfamily: Orchidoideae
- Genus: Disa
- Species: D. ornithantha

Binomial name
- Disa ornithantha Schltr.

Species of flowering plant

Disa ornithantha is a perennial plant and geophyte belonging to the genus Disa. The species occurs in Angola, Democratic Republic of the Congo, Malawi, Mozambique, Tanzania, Zambia and Zimbabwe.
