= Disa andringitrana =

Scientific classification
- Kingdom: Plantae
- Clade: Tracheophytes
- Clade: Angiosperms
- Clade: Monocots
- Order: Asparagales
- Family: Orchidaceae
- Subfamily: Orchidoideae
- Genus: Disa
- Species: D. andringitrana

Binomial name
- Disa andringitrana Schltr.

Species of flowering plant

Disa andringitrana is a perennial plant and geophyte belonging to the genus Disa. The species is endemic to Madagascar, where it occurs in central and southern Madagascar.
