= Disa miniata =

Scientific classification
- Kingdom: Plantae
- Clade: Tracheophytes
- Clade: Angiosperms
- Clade: Monocots
- Order: Asparagales
- Family: Orchidaceae
- Subfamily: Orchidoideae
- Genus: Disa
- Species: D. miniata

Binomial name
- Disa miniata Summerh.

Species of flowering plant

Disa miniata, commonly known as the least disa, is a perennial plant and geophyte belonging to the genus Disa. The plant is native to the Democratic Republic of the Congo, Malawi, Mozambique, Tanzania, Zambia and Zimbabwe.
