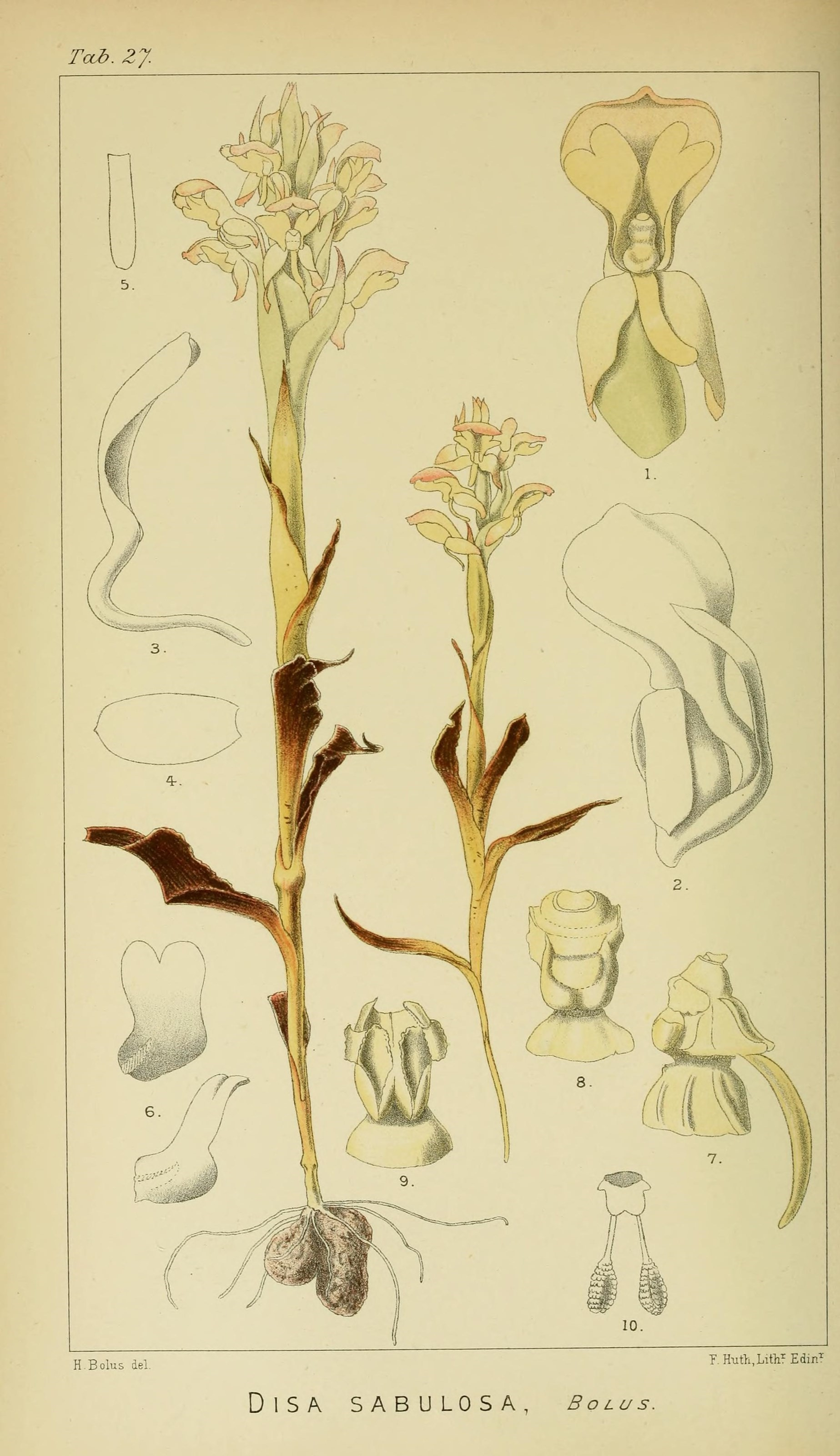

Scientific classification
- Kingdom: Plantae
- Clade: Tracheophytes
- Clade: Angiosperms
- Clade: Monocots
- Order: Asparagales
- Family: Orchidaceae
- Subfamily: Orchidoideae
- Genus: Disa
- Species: D. sabulosa

Binomial name
- Disa sabulosa Bolus, (1893)

Synonyms
- Monadenia sabulosa (Bolus) Kraenzl.

= Disa sabulosa =

Species of flowering plant

Disa sabulosa is a perennial plant and geophyte belonging to the genus Disa and is part of the fynbos. The plant is endemic to the Western Cape and currently occurs from Pringle Bay to Betty's Bay. The species occurred on the Cape Peninsula but was last seen there 45 years ago and is considered extinct there. It has a range of only 6 km2 and the total population is estimated to be less than 1 000 plants. The plant is currently threatened by invasive plants and further development on the coast. The plant flowers after wildfires.
