= Clarence Drive =

Mountain pass in South Africa

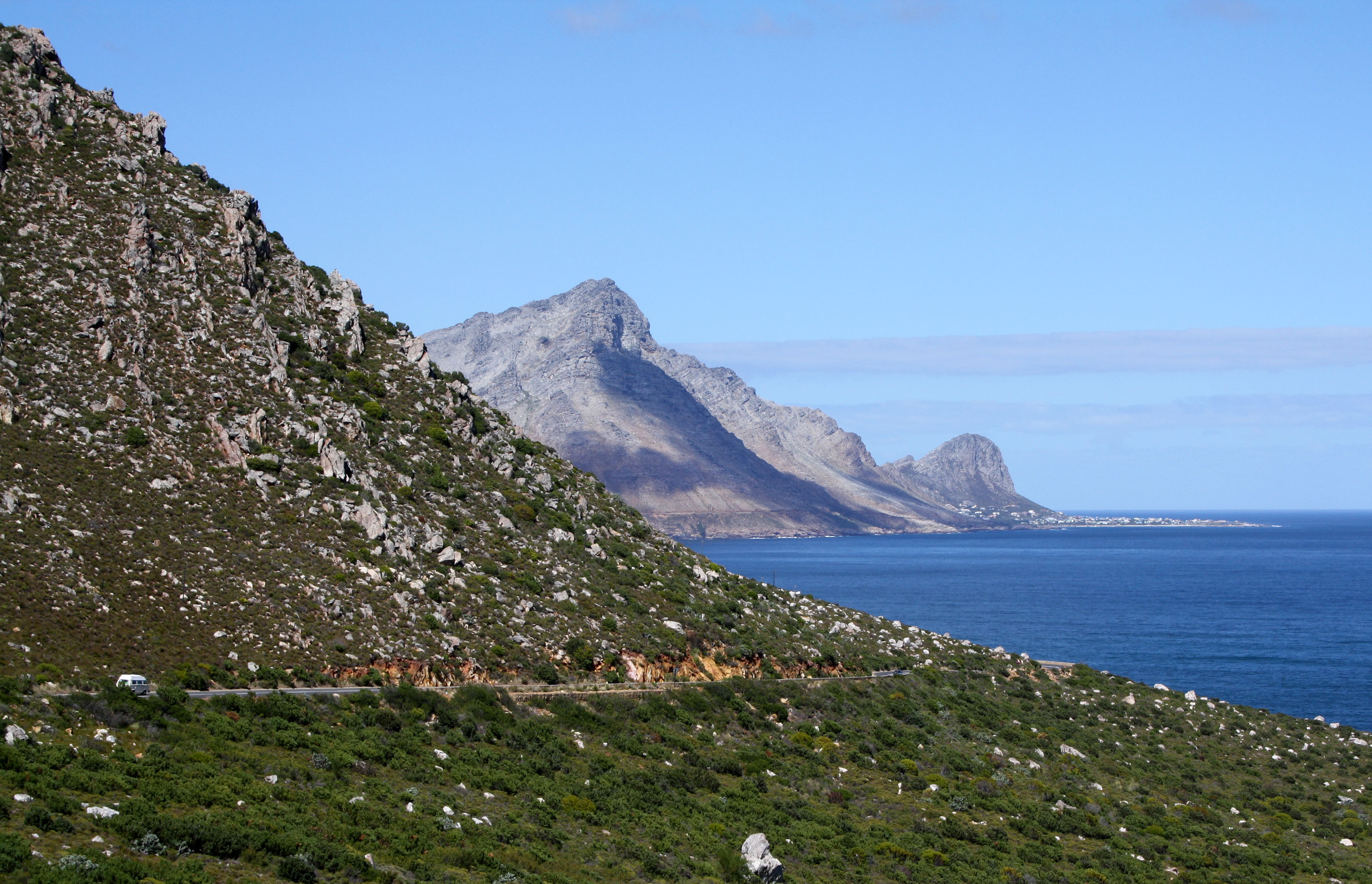
- Klein-Hangklip as seen from Clarence Drive
- Length: 22 km (14 mi)
- Traversed by: R44

Third Approach
- Location: Between Gordon's Bay and Rooi-Els

Clarence Drive is a mountain pass crossed by the R44 road between Gordon's Bay and Rooi-Els. The tourist route is 22 km long and provides a panoramic view of False Bay, the coastline, Table Mountain, and parts of the Cape Peninsula. The nearby coast is popular with anglers and whale watchers, and Kogel Bay Resort is particularly sought after by surfers.

The drive follows the east coast of False Bay in Western Cape, South Africa, and connects Strand with Hangklip to the south, similarly to Chapman's Peak Drive.

== History ==
In the past, supplies had to be shipped to Rooi-Els and walked up the pass by drovers. Businessman Gerald "Jack" Clarence, who owned property in Hangklip and Betty's Bay, proposed building a road through the area, which would begin construction in 1940 and would be completed by Italian POWs during World War II. On May 29, 1998, Premier of the Western Cape Gerald Morkel opened reconstructed portions of the road. Overlooks have been built, but there are still some sharp turns and rockslides sometimes occur.

== The road ==
The road begins near Gordon's Bay, winds south over the mouth of the Steenbras River and proceeds past Kogel Bay, Sparks' Bay, and Rooi-Els to near Pringle Bay. Here the pathway forks, with one road going near Cape Hangklip and the other lifting it to Betty's Bay.

== See also ==
- List of mountain passes of South Africa
