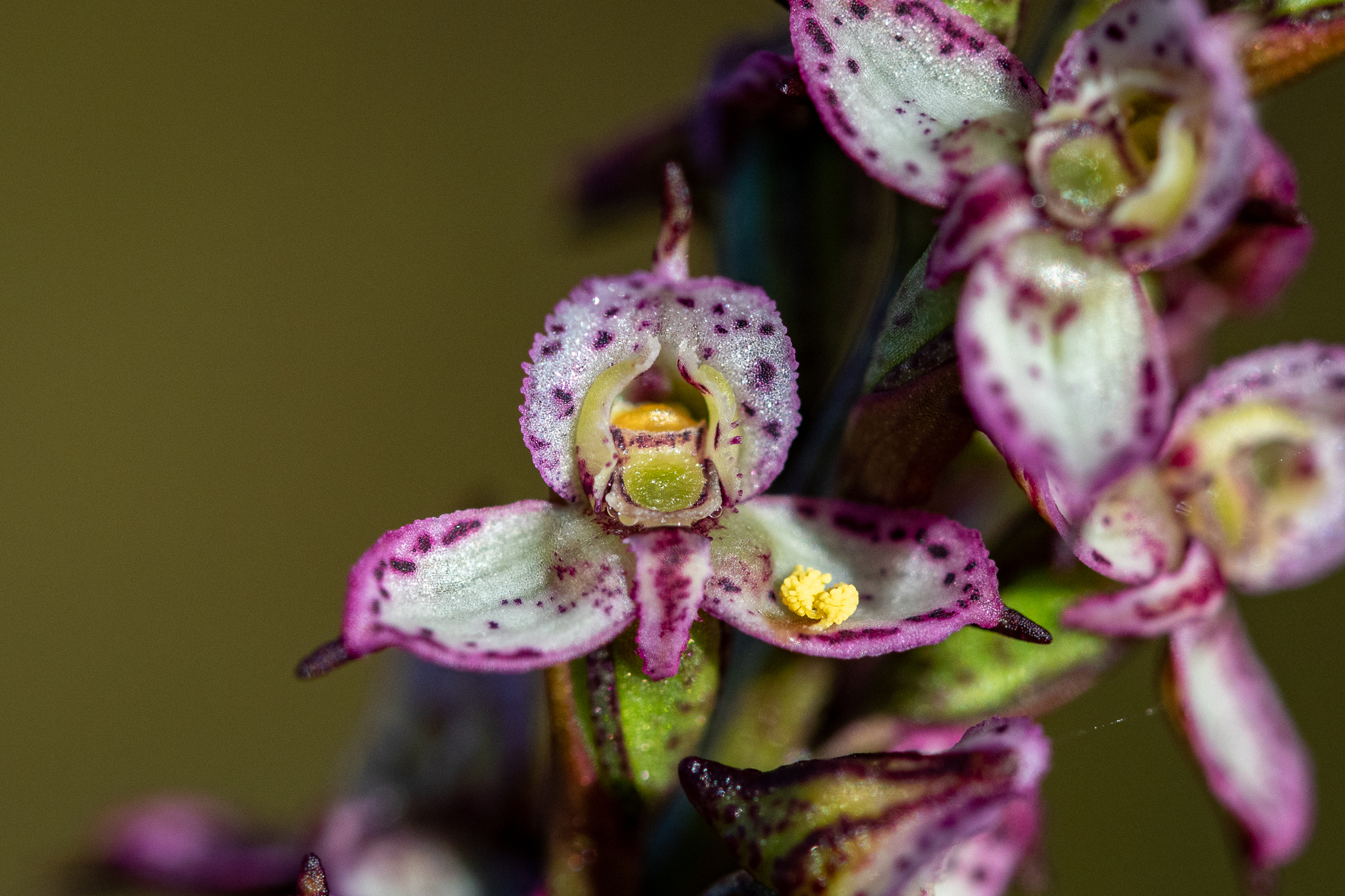

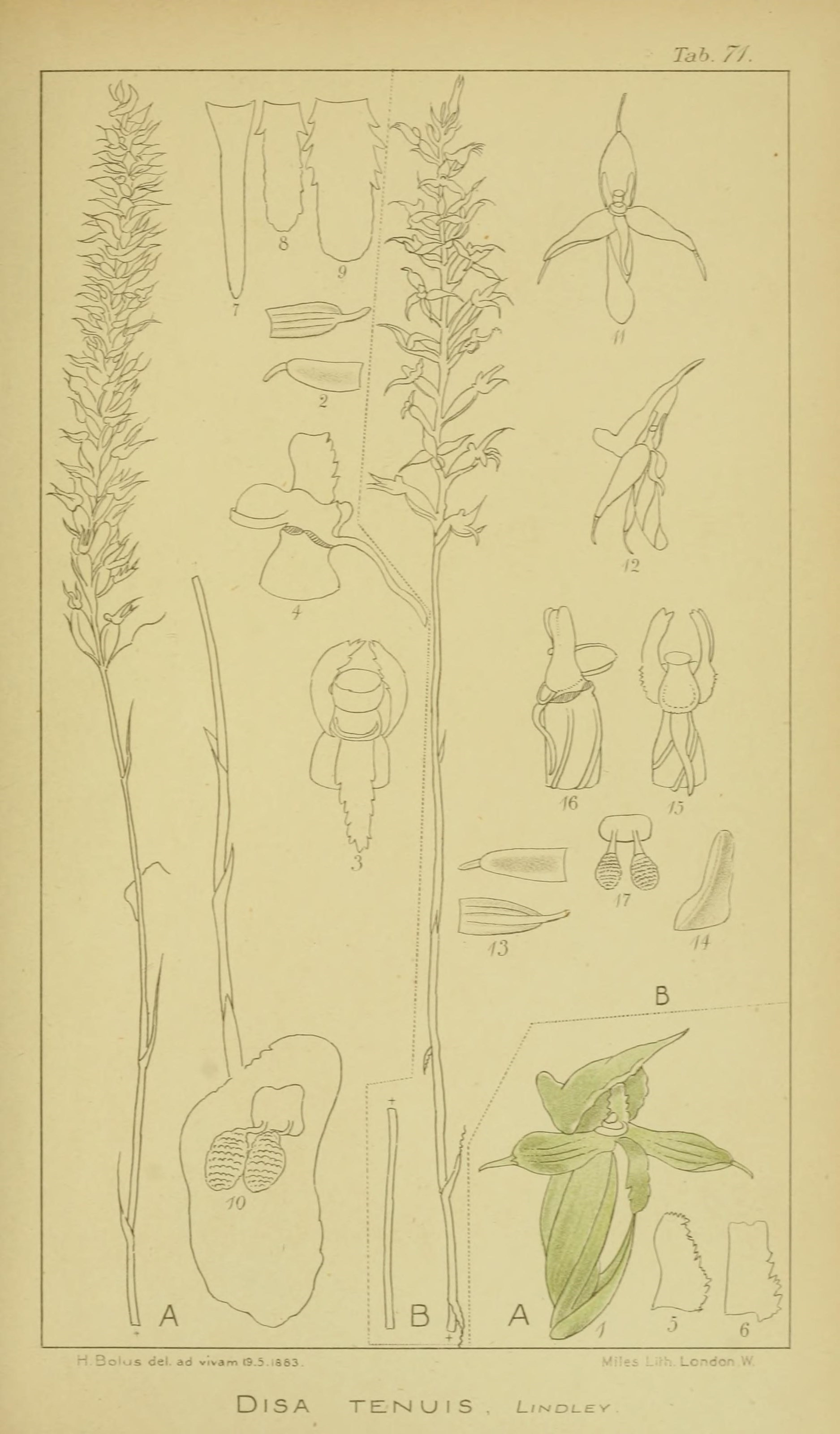

Scientific classification
- Kingdom: Plantae
- Clade: Tracheophytes
- Clade: Angiosperms
- Clade: Monocots
- Order: Asparagales
- Family: Orchidaceae
- Subfamily: Orchidoideae
- Genus: Disa
- Species: D. tenuis

Binomial name
- Disa tenuis Lindl., (1838)

Synonyms
- Amphigena leptostachya (Sond.) Rolfe; Amphigena tenuis (Lindl.) Rolfe; Disa leptostachys Sond.; Monadenia tenuis (Lindl.) Kraenzl.

= Disa tenuis =

Species of flowering plant

Disa tenuis is a perennial plant and geophyte belonging to the genus Disa and is part of the fynbos. The plant is endemic to the Western Cape and occurs from the Cape Peninsula and Betty's Bay to Tulbagh and Franschhoek. The plant is considered rare.
