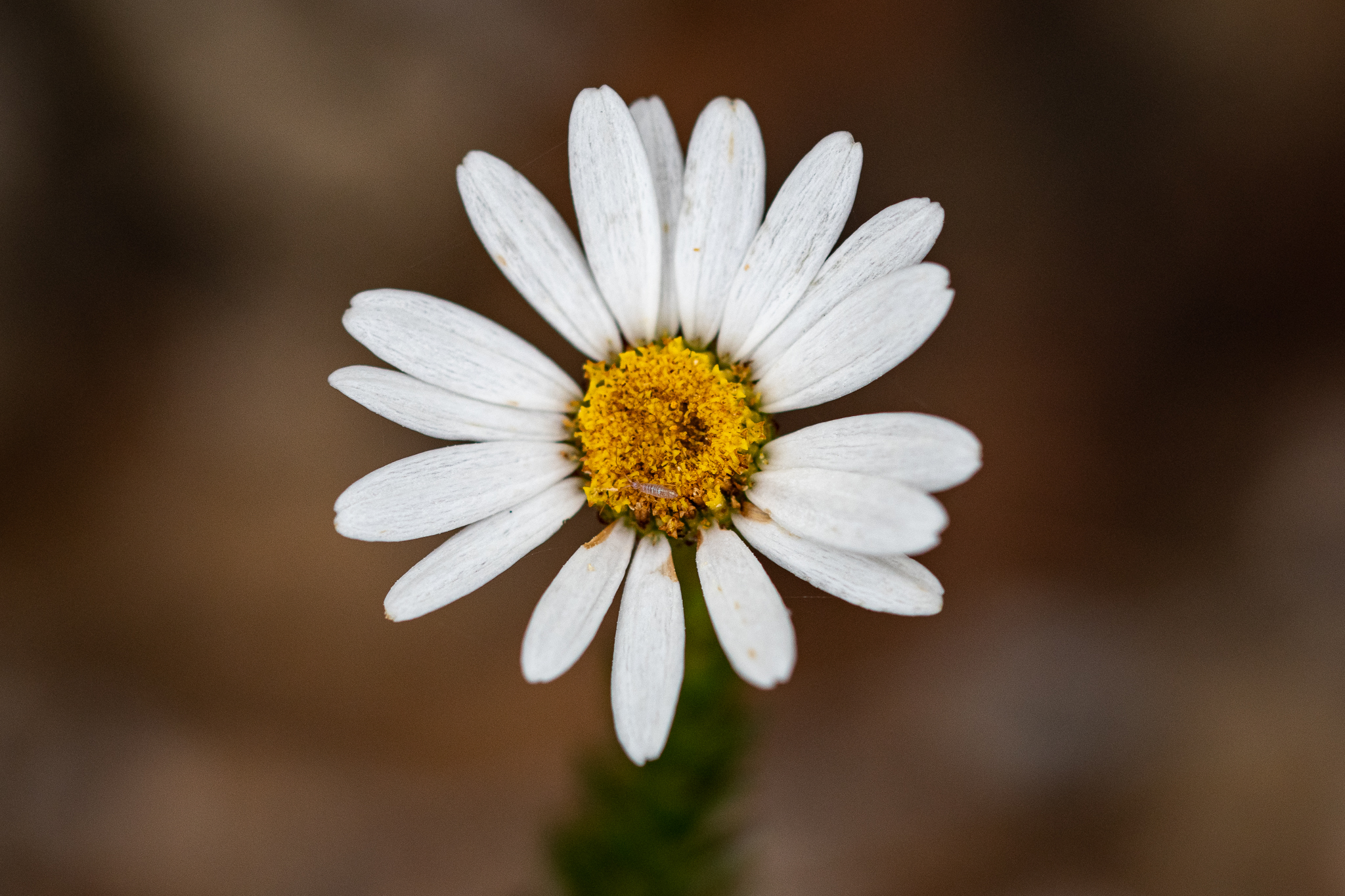

Scientific classification
- Kingdom: Plantae
- Clade: Tracheophytes
- Clade: Angiosperms
- Clade: Eudicots
- Clade: Asterids
- Order: Asterales
- Family: Asteraceae
- Genus: Osmitopsis
- Species: O. parvifolia

Binomial name
- Osmitopsis parvifolia (DC.) Hofmeyr

Synonyms
- Osmitopsis parvifolia D.C.

= Osmitopsis parvifolia =

Littleleaf Swampdaisy

South African plant species

Osmitopsis parvifolia, known as the littleleaf swampdaisy, is a species of plant from South Africa.

== Description ==
This shrublet grows up to 40 cm (16 in) tall and is densely covered in oval-shaped leaves. The leaves are reflexed (bent downwards) and serrated. They measure 4–10 mm (0.16–0.39 in) in length. Flowers are present between September and February. The flower heads are radiate and solitary. They are yellow with white rays. The pappus (a modified calyx that surround the individual floret) is absent.

== Distribution and habitat ==
This species is endemic to the Western Cape of South Africa, where it grows between Betty's Bay and Sir Lowry's Pass. It grows on stony sandstone slopes and in crevices. There are three known crevices which have a collective area of 200 km^{2} (77 sq mi). It is found at an altitude of 420–1,250 m (1,380–4,100 ft).

== Conservation ==
Although the species has no known threats, it has a small range. As such, it is considered to be rare by the South African National Biodiversity Institute.
