= Erica riparia =

Scientific classification
- Kingdom: Plantae
- Clade: Tracheophytes
- Clade: Angiosperms
- Clade: Eudicots
- Clade: Asterids
- Order: Ericales
- Family: Ericaceae
- Genus: Erica
- Species: E. riparia

Binomial name
- Erica riparia H.A.Baker

Species of flowering plant

Erica riparia is a plant that belongs to the genus Erica and is part of the fynbos. The species is endemic to the Western Cape and occurs from Betty's Bay to Soetanysberg. There are three subpopulations and two are threatened by invasive plants and the other by a housing project on the coast.
