= Kate Jagoe-Davies =

South African artist and campaigner (1954–2009)

- Born: 19 November 1954
- Died: 8 July 2009 (aged 54)
- Education: PhD
- Occupations: Activist; Artist
- Spouse: Bryan Davies
- Children: no children

Kate Jagoe-Davies (19 November 1954 – 8 July 2009) was a South African artist and anti-apartheid and disability rights activist.

== Early life and education ==
Davies was born in 1954 in the Letsiteli Valley, East London. At the age of 15 she broke her neck when swimming in the sea, and was paralysed from her shoulders down.

She studied at Rhodes University after convincing the authorities that she would be able to get around the campus in her wheelchair and would also be able subsequently to teach from a wheelchair. She obtained a Bachelor of Fine Art in 1979 and a Bachelor of Education in 1981 or a BA in Education: sources differ.

== Disability work ==
In the early 1980s, Jagoe-Davies set up a recording service, where volunteers read banned books onto audio-tape to make them available for blind people.

In 1986 she was invited to start a disability unit at the University of Cape Town, from which she retired in 1996 due to ill health. In 2005 the Higher Education Disability Services Association (HEDSA) was founded, to bring together the then 23 services supporting disabled students in South African higher education. A speaker said "It would not be over-fanciful to claim that the existence of HEDSA has come to be because, on a fateful day, an exuberant young Kate dived off a rock into water that proved not to be deep enough and broke her neck."

== Art ==
Jagoe-Davies was an oil painter, and her paintings included landscapes, flowers, baboons, portraits and interiors. Her paintings are in the US, New Zealand, Australia, England, Canada, South Africa, and France.

== Recognition ==
Jagoe-Davies was the winner of the Foysa award for outstanding young South Africans.

She received honorary doctorates from Rhodes University in 1993 and from the University of Cape Town in 2003.

== Personal life and death ==
Kate Jagoe married Bryan Davies, a UCT Zoologist. They lived at Pringle Bay, Kogelberg Biosphere Reserve, east of Cape Town. The couple had a great love for Chacma Baboon troop and Kate appeared in a 2006 documentary about them.

Davis and Bryan have two sons Christopher, Robert and one daughter Katherine.

Jagoe-Davies was diagnosed with renal failure in 2003, and was told by doctors that she had three months to live. She died on 8 July 2009.
