= Harold Porter National Botanical Garden =

Conservation area at Betty's Bay in the Western Cape, South Africa

Coordinates: 34°21′06″S 18°55′37″E

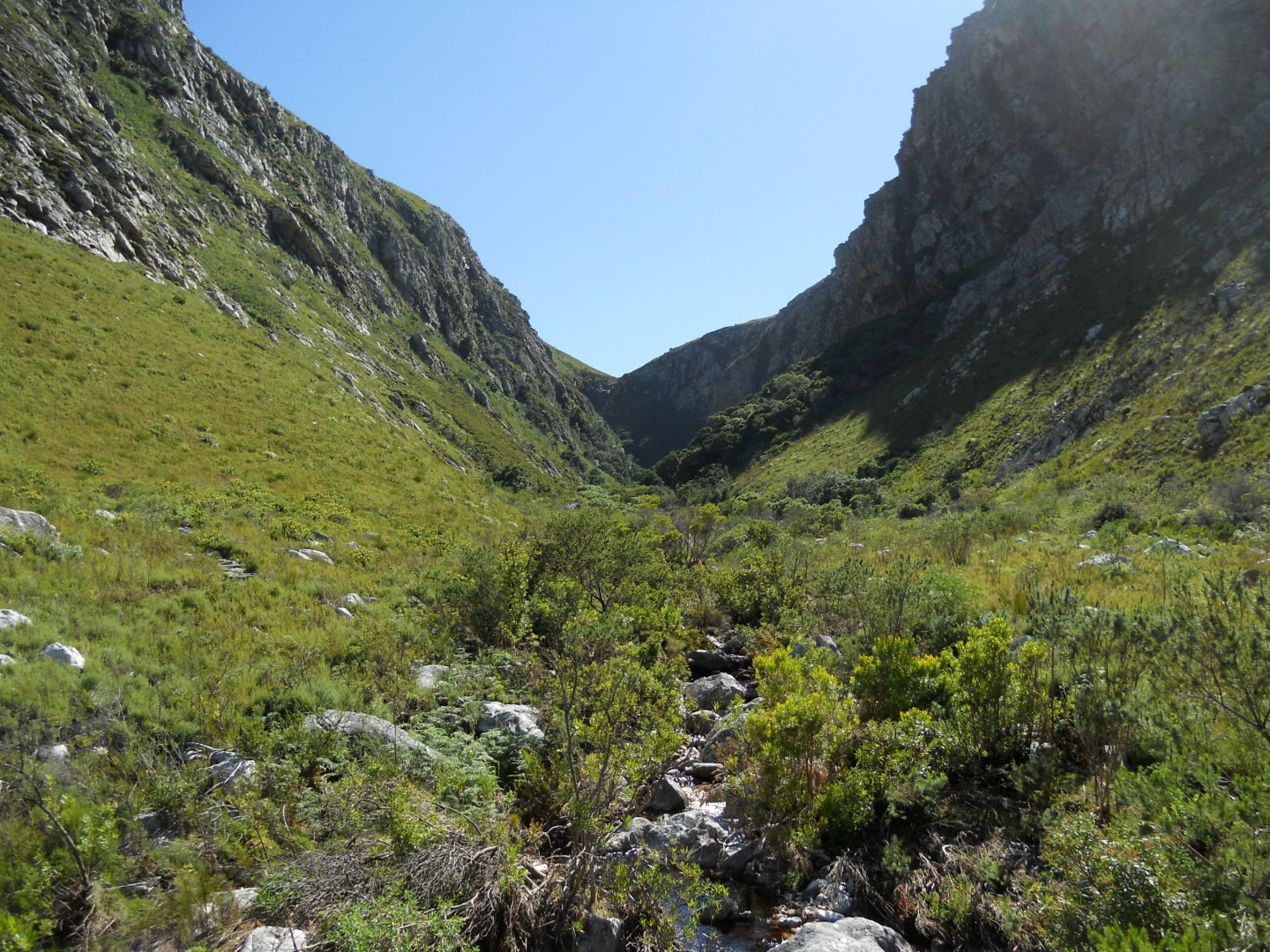
- Interactive map of Harold Porter National Botanical Garden
- Type: Botanical garden
- Location: Kogelberg Biosphere Reserve
- Nearest city: Betty's Bay
- Area: 200 hectares (490 acres)
- Established: Shangri-la Nature Reserve 1955; 71 years ago
- Opened: 1959
- Administrator: SANBI
- Website: www.sanbi.org/gardens/harold-porter/

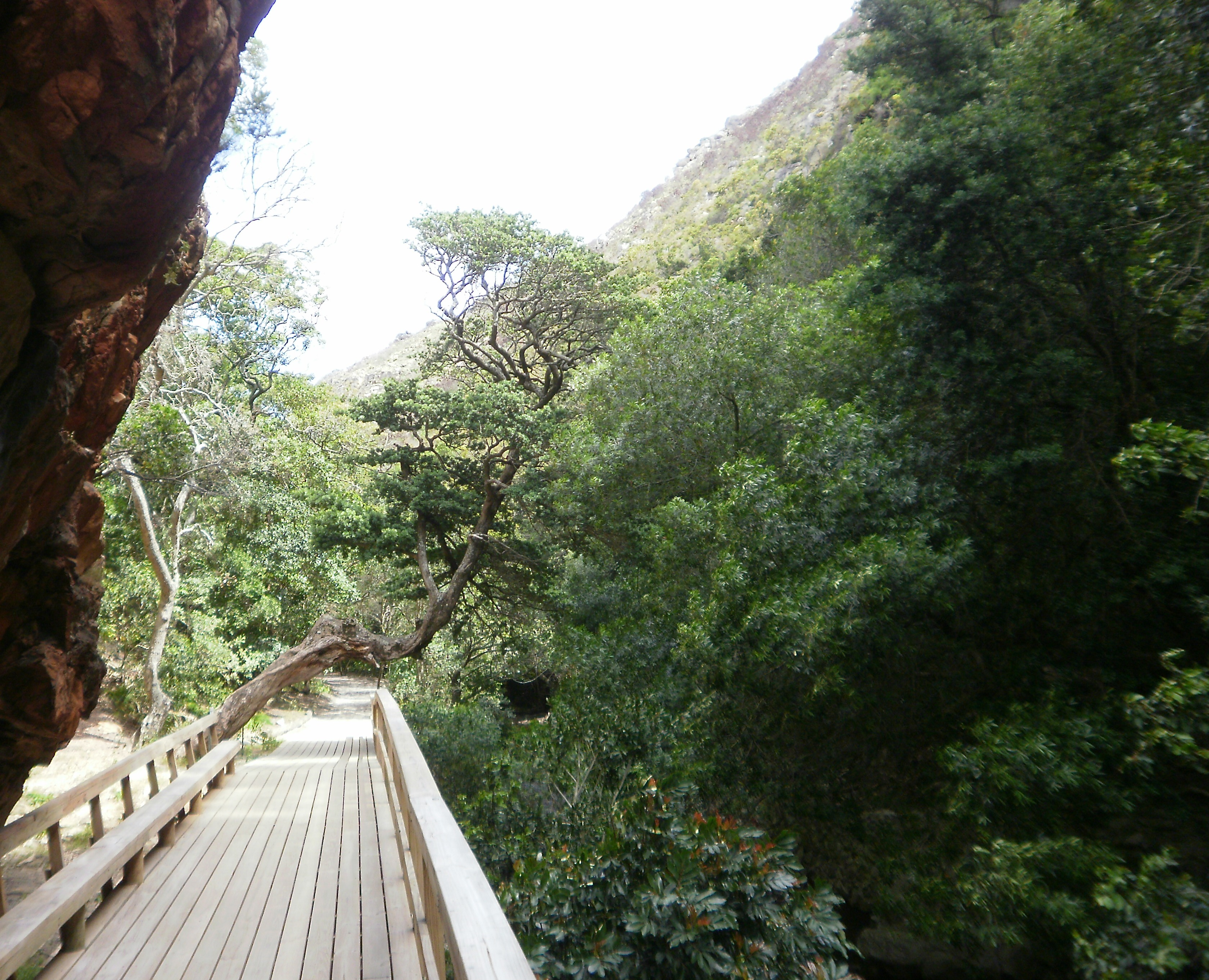
Indigenous forest section in the Harold Porter National Botanical Garden

The Harold Porter National Botanical Garden covers almost 200 ha between mountain and sea, in the heart of the Cape Fynbos region within the Kogelberg Biosphere Reserve to the east of Cape Town, South Africa, specifically near Betty's Bay along Clarence Drive (R44). With about 1,600 plant species, the area contains a floral diversity per unit area that is greater than anywhere else in the world. The Garden consists of 10 hectares of cultivated gardens and 190.5 hectares of pristine natural fynbos. In addition, 60 species of birds can be found there, as well as porcupines, genets, skunks, hyraxes, baboons, and snakes. Foot trails reach cliffs, ravines, heaths, forests, streams, and mountain pools.

In 1939, Harold Nixon Porter, Jack Clarence, and Arthur Youldon, purchased the land between Rooi-Els and the Palmiet River. After Porter's death, the land was passed to the South African National Biodiversity Institute (SANBI). The local municipality later added adjacent land to the garden.

In 2022, the garden was expanded by 1.15 ha after the addition of a neighbouring erf, purchased in 2018 by the World Wide Fund for Nature South Africa (WWF-SA). In 2019 the WWF-SA entered into a 99-year management agreement with SANBI.

== Gallery ==
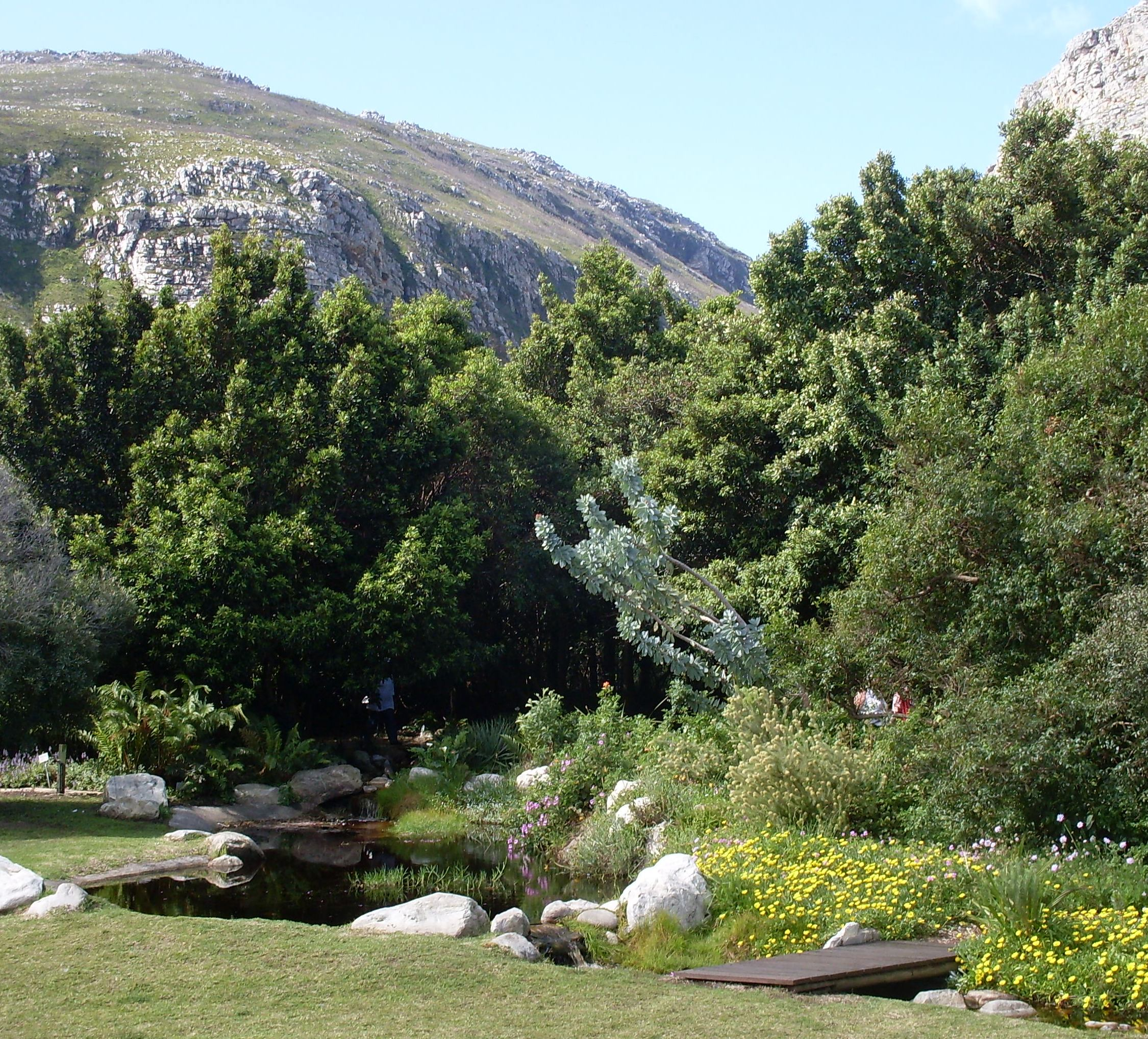
Rapanea trees and some waboom (Protea nitida) growing in the gardens

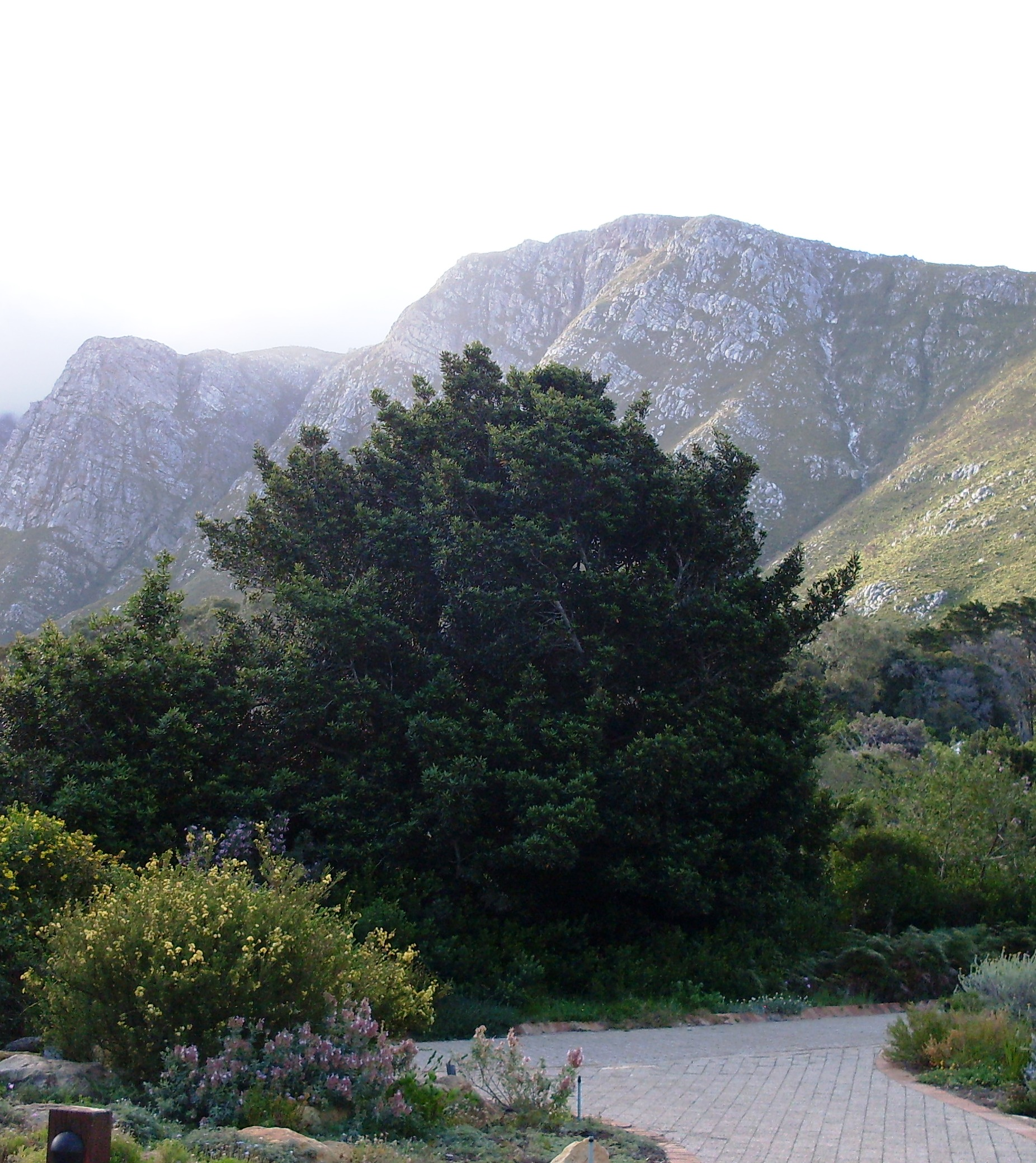
A Cape Beech tree (Rapanea melanophloeos)

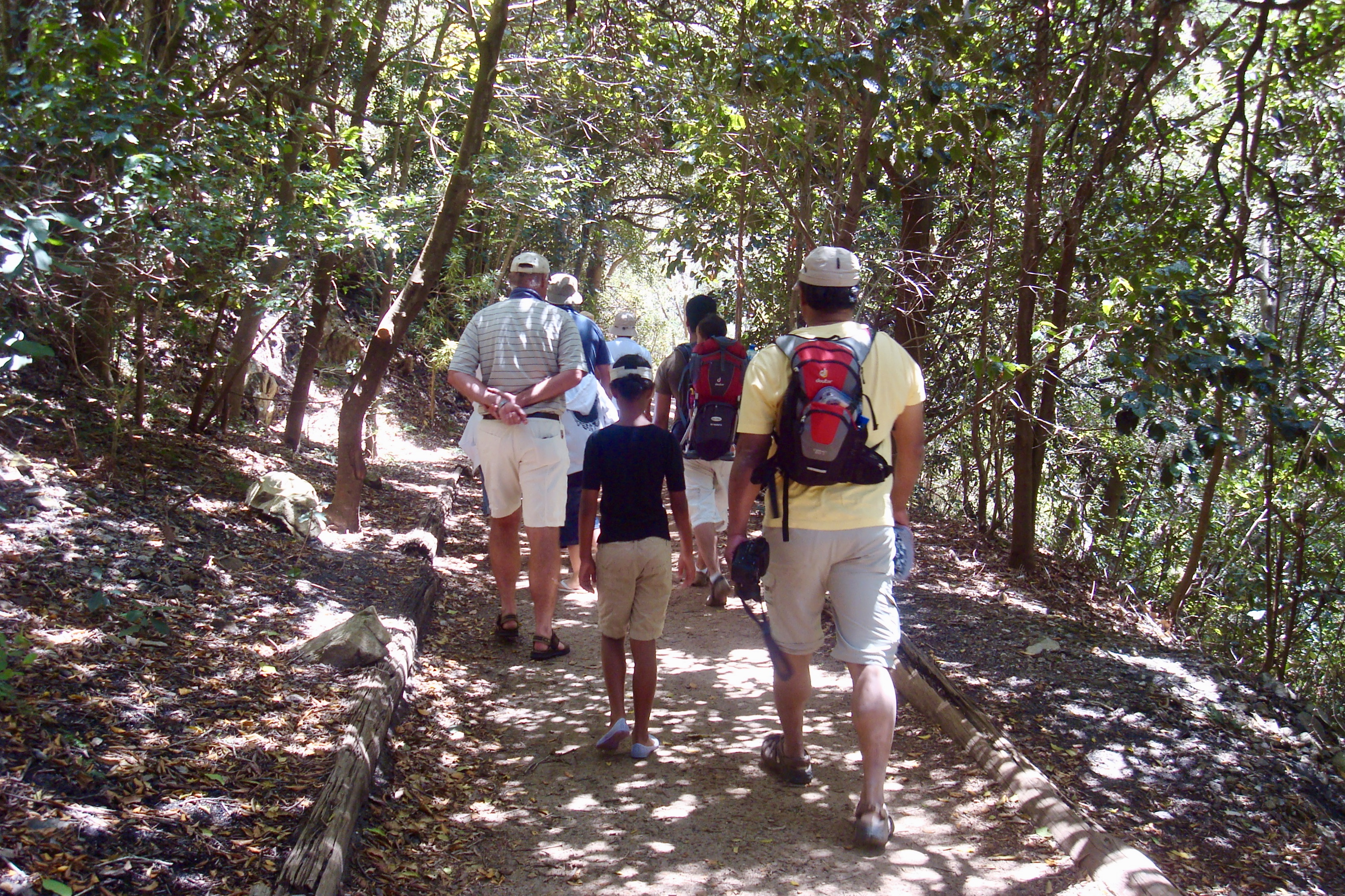
Visitors walking through the forest

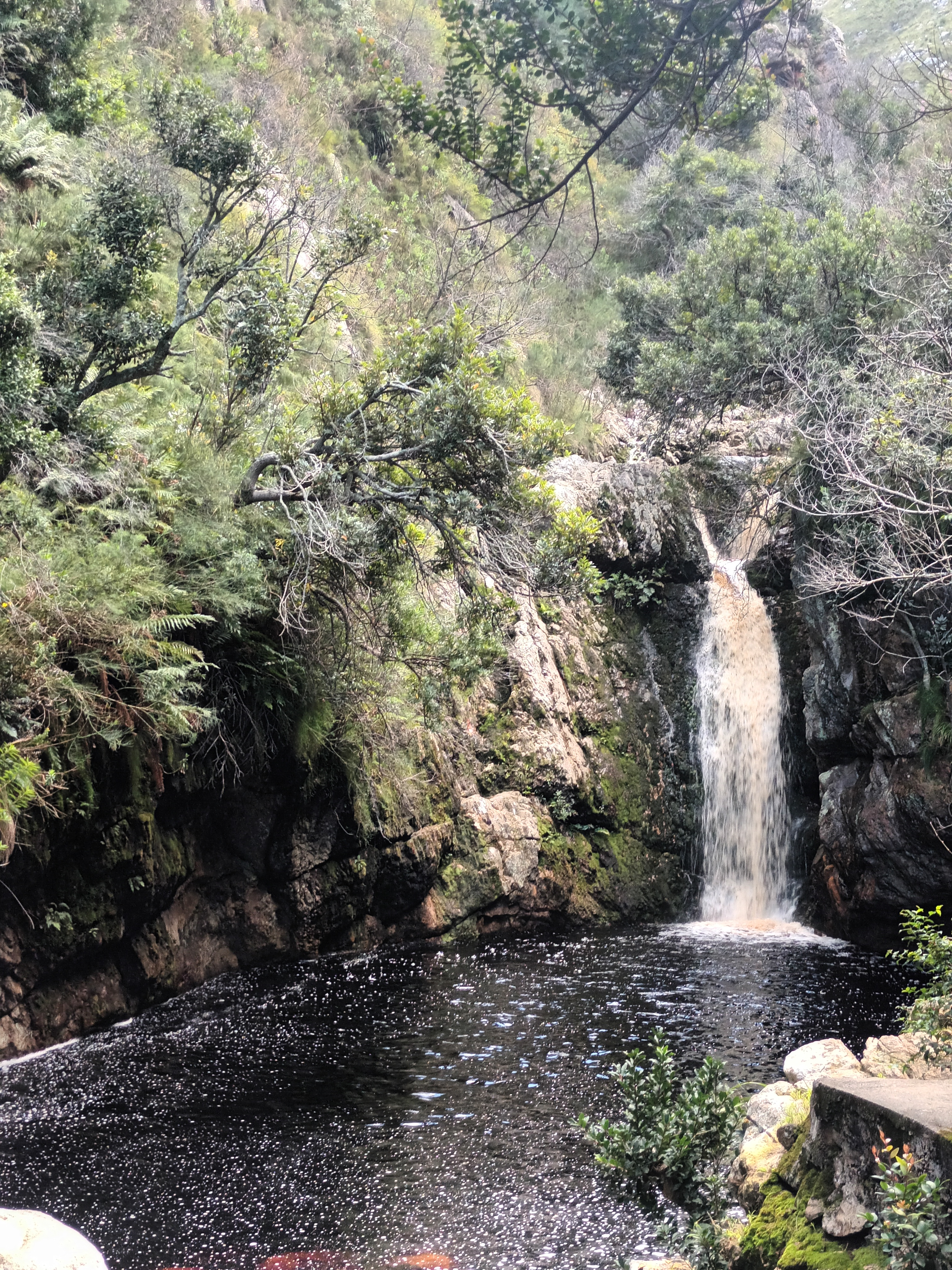

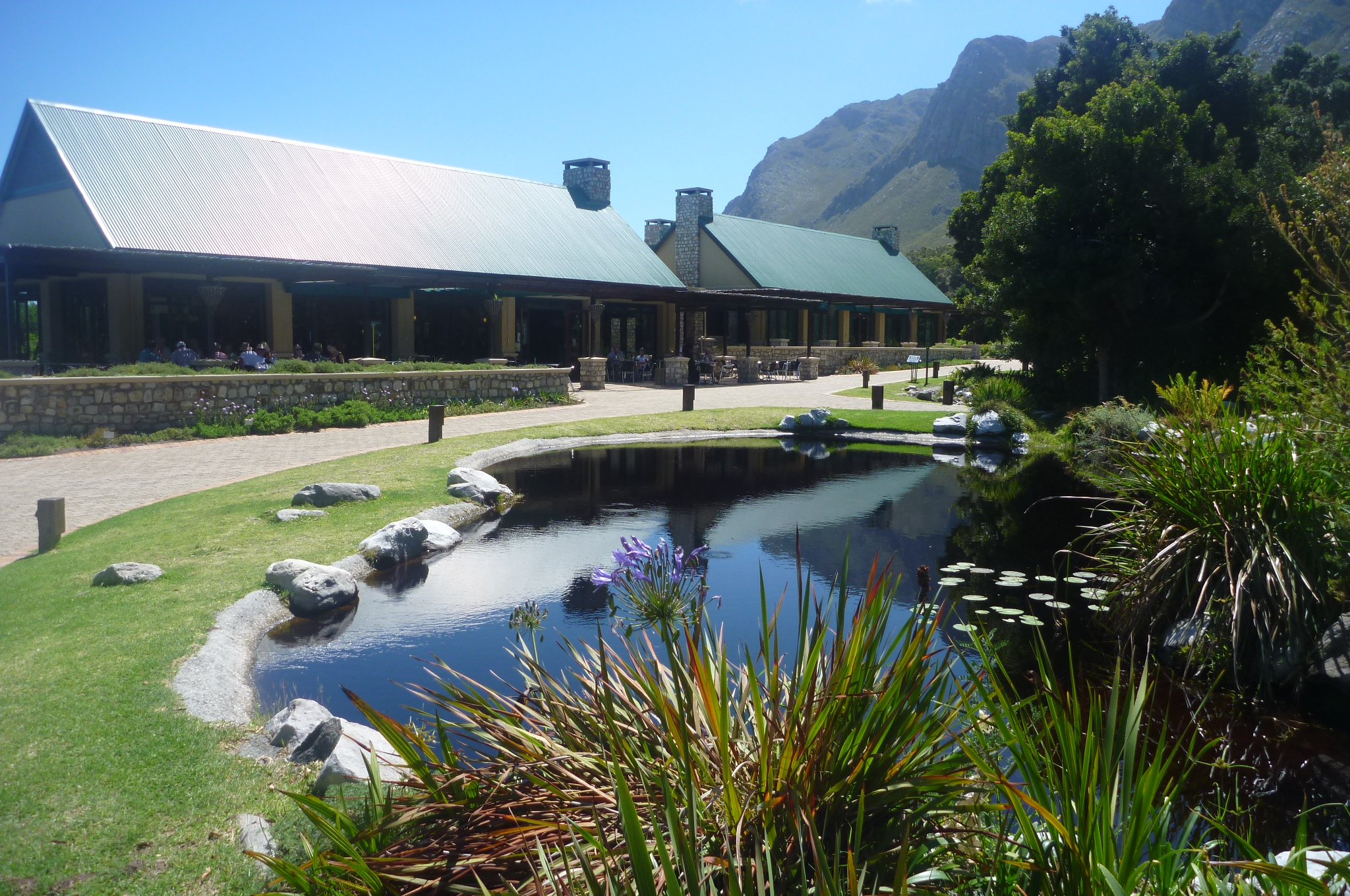

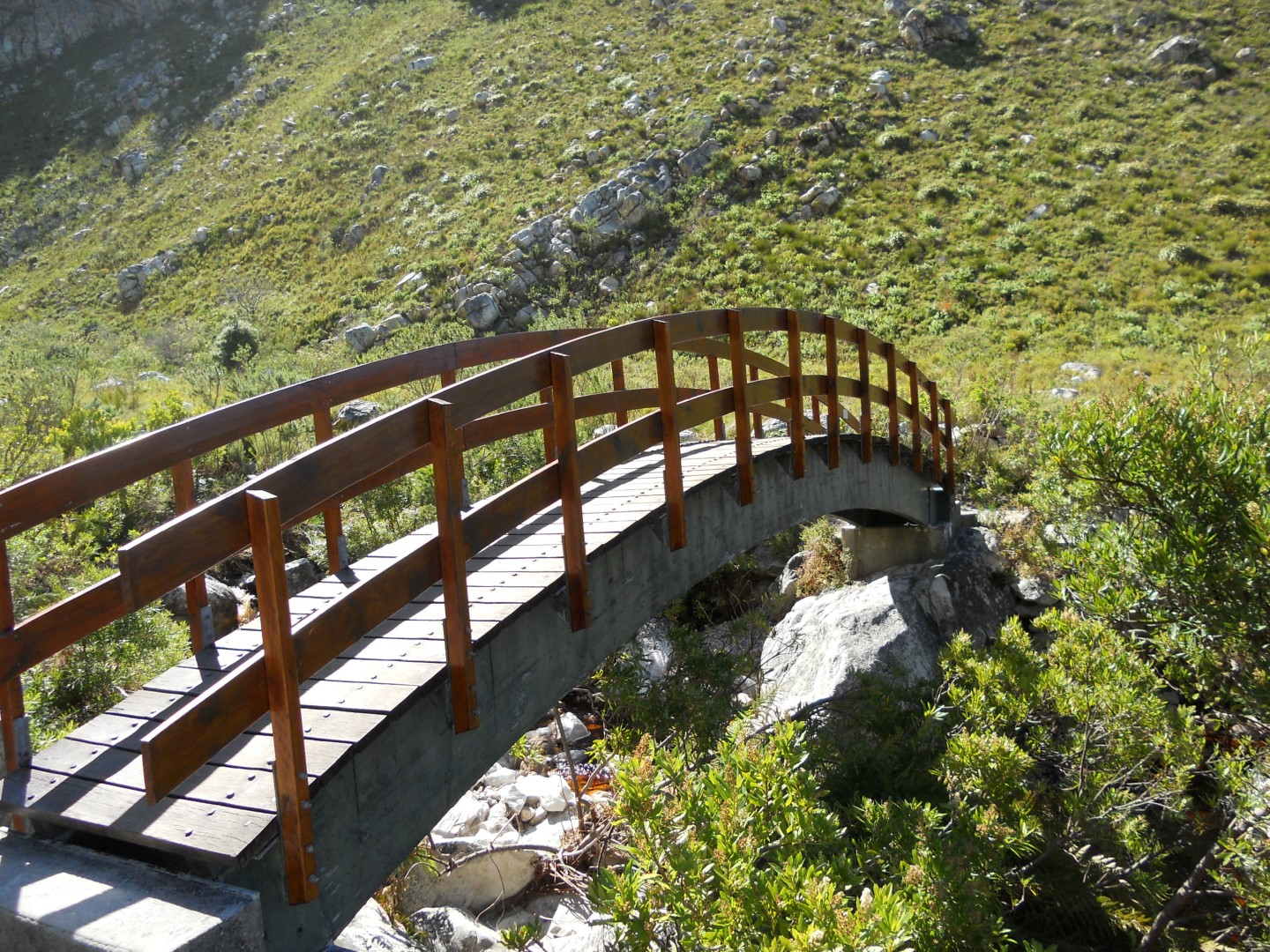

== See also ==
- List of botanical gardens in South Africa
