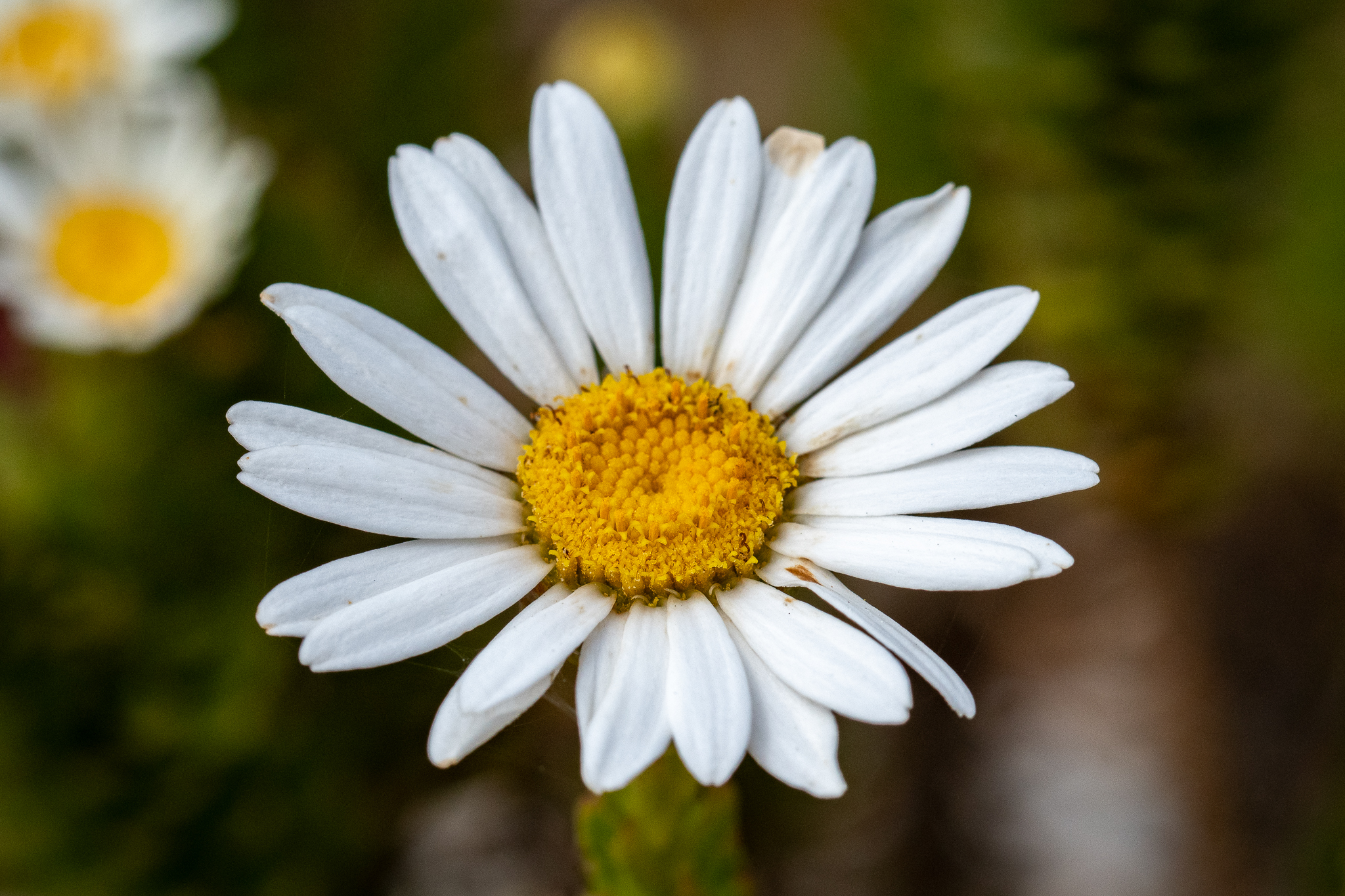

Scientific classification
- Kingdom: Plantae
- Clade: Tracheophytes
- Clade: Angiosperms
- Clade: Eudicots
- Clade: Asterids
- Order: Asterales
- Family: Asteraceae
- Genus: Osmitopsis
- Species: O. afra

Binomial name
- Osmitopsis afra (L.) K.Bremer (1972)

Synonyms
- Anthemis afra L. (1759); Anthemis leucantha L. (1760); Osmites hirsuta Less. (1832); Osmites leucantha (L.) Druce (1914)

= Osmitopsis afra =

Hairy Swampdaisy

Species of flowering plant

Osmitopsis afra, the hairy swampdaisy, is an Osmitopsis species in the tribe Anthemideae. It is endemic to the Western Cape in South Africa.
