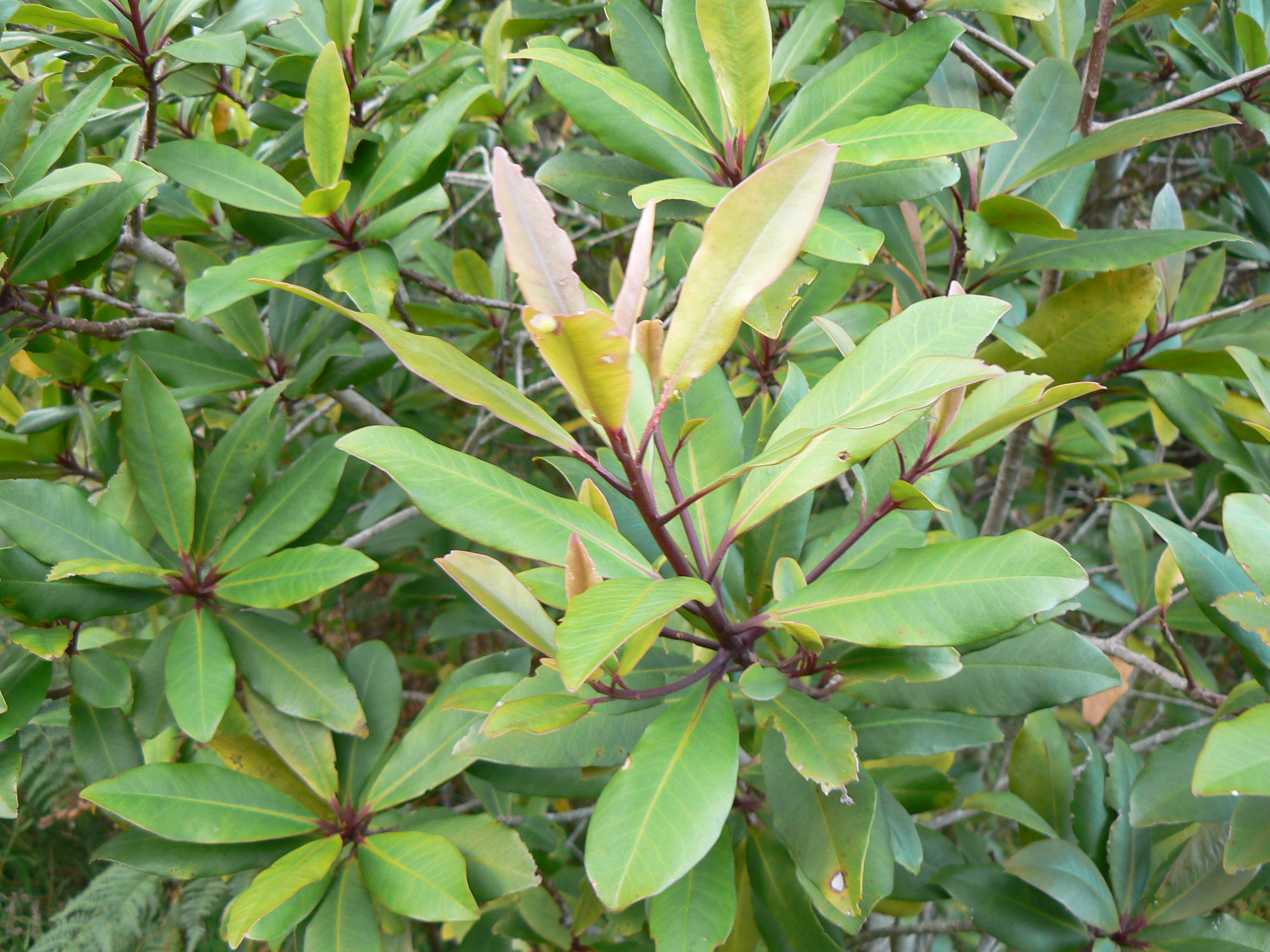

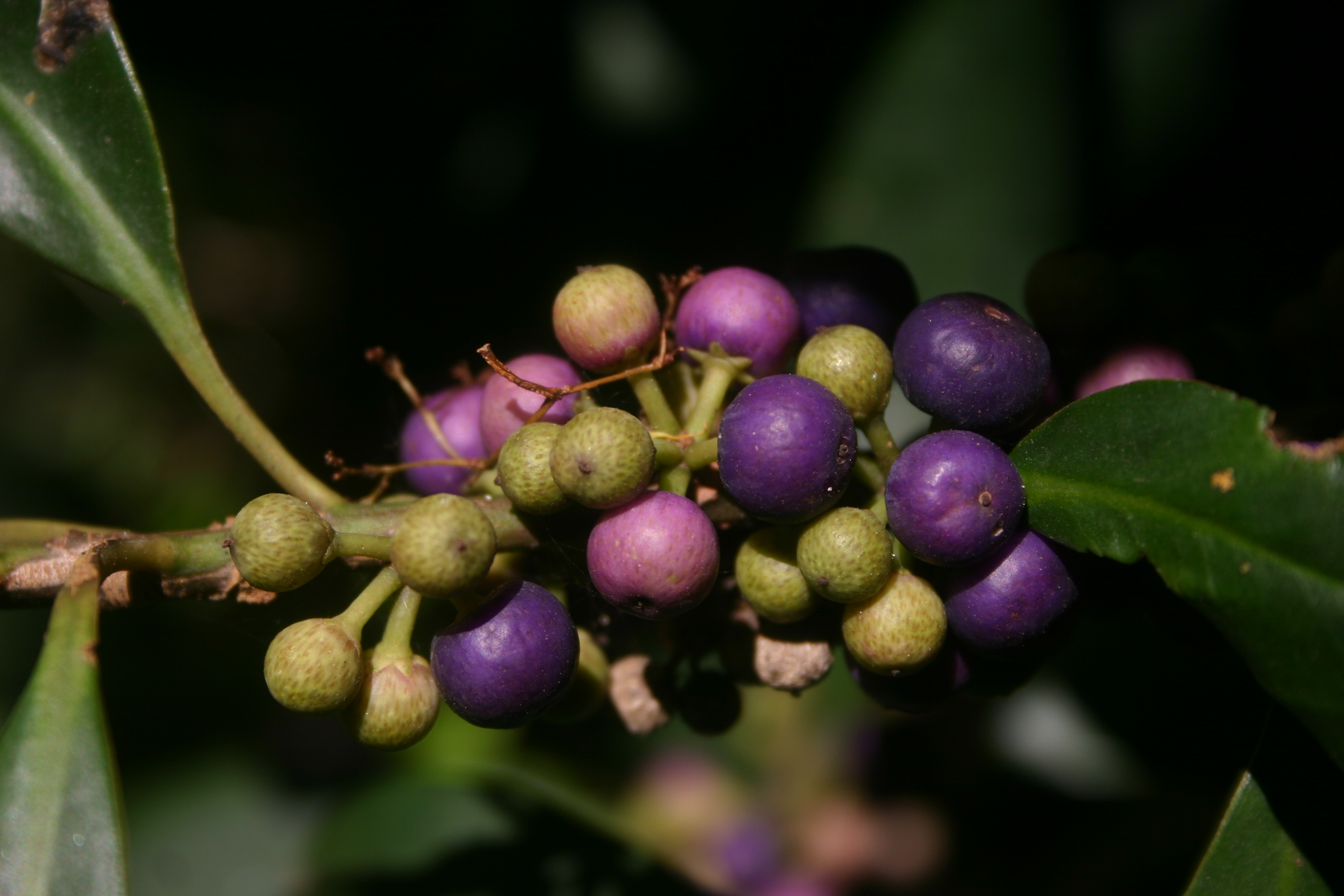

Scientific classification
- Kingdom: Plantae
- Clade: Embryophytes
- Clade: Tracheophytes
- Clade: Spermatophytes
- Clade: Angiosperms
- Clade: Eudicots
- Clade: Asterids
- Order: Ericales
- Family: Primulaceae
- Genus: Myrsine
- Species: M. melanophloeos

Binomial name
- Myrsine melanophloeos (L.) R.Br. ex Sweet (1818)

Synonyms
- Synonymy: Chrysophyllum millerianum Lam. (1794); Chrysophyllum melanophoeos (L.) Lam. (1794); Heeria melanophloeos (L.) Meisn. (1844); Manglilla melanophloeos (L.) Pers. (1805); Manglilla venulosa Roem. & Schult. (1819); Myrsine neurophylla Gilg. (1894); Myrsine pentandr (Aiton) R.Br. ex B.D.Jacks. (1894); Myrsine rhododendroides Gilg (1894); Myrsine runssorica Gilg (1895); Myrsine samara R.Br. ex Sweet (1818), nom. superfl.; Myrsine simensis Hochst. ex A.DC. (1844); Myrsine ulugurensis (Mez) Gilg ex Prain (1908); Myrsine venulosa Spreng. (1824); Rapanea bequaertii De Wild. (1925); Rapanea gracilior Mildbr. (1934); Rapanea lamiaensis De Wild. (1925); Rapanea melanophloeos (L.) Mez (1902); Rapanea neurophylla (Gilg) Mez (1902); Rapanea pulchra Gilg & G.Schellenb. (1912); Rapanea rhododendroides (Gilg) Mez (1902); Rapanea runssorica (Gilg) Mez (1902); Rapanea schliebenii Mildbr. (1934); Rapanea simensis (Hochst. ex A.DC.) Mez (1902); Rapanea thomensis Exell (1944); Rapanea ulugurensis Mez (1902); Rapanea umbratilis S.Moore (1911); Rapanea usambarensis Gilg & G.Schellenb. (1912); Roemeria melanophloeos (L.) Thunb. (1798); Samara pentandra Aiton (1789); Scleroxylum venulosum Willd. (1809); Sideroxylon laurifolium Lam. (1783); Sideroxylon melanophloeos L. (1767)

= Myrsine melanophloeos =

Cape beech

Species of tree

Myrsine melanophloeos, commonly known as Cape beech, Kaapboekenhout (Afrikaans), isiCalabi (Zulu) or isiQwane sehlati (Xhosa) is a dense evergreen tree that is native to the afromontane forests of Africa, ranging from Nigeria and Sudan to South Africa. Outside forests they are also commonly encountered along stream banks and in gullies.

Despite its common name, it is not a close relative of the familiar beech tree of the northern hemisphere, and it is actually more closely related to the Rhododendrons; it comes from the beech-like grain of its wood. The Xhosa name isiQwane sehlati meaning "forest protea" comes from the tree's leaves bunching like a protea (isiQwane) flower.

== Distribution ==
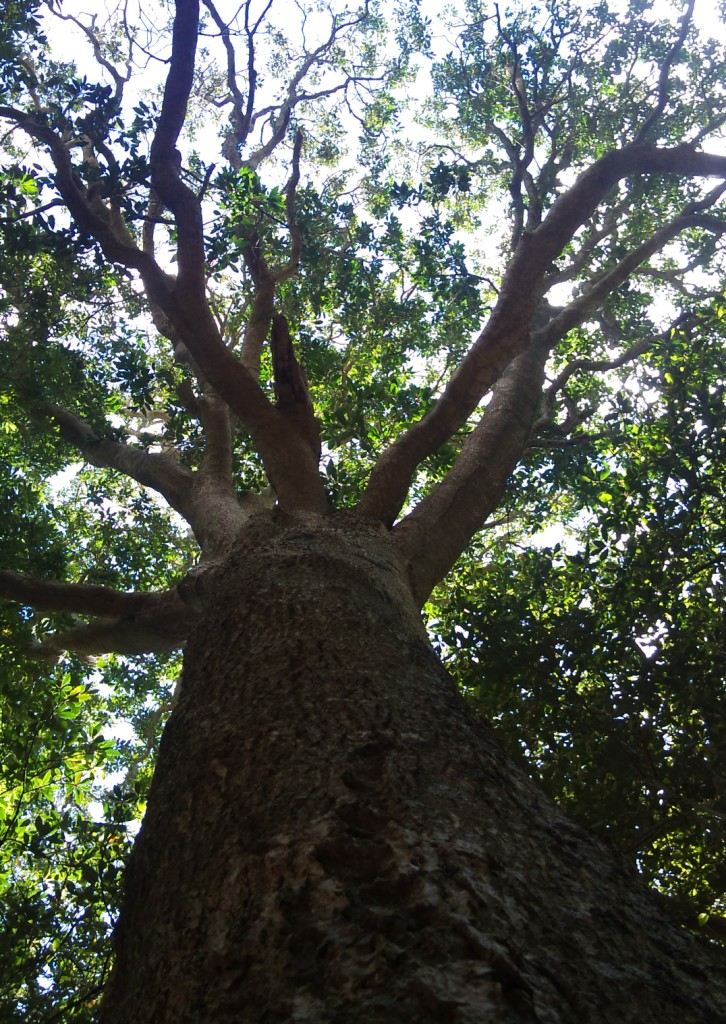
Fully grown Myrsine melanophloeos in native afro-temperate forest near Cape Town.

The natural range of this stately tree is from Cape Town in the south, to Ethiopia and Nigeria in the north. In the Eastern Cape it is sometimes found alongside its smaller coastal relative, Myrsine gilliana.

== Description ==
Myrsine melanophloeos is a dense evergreen tree. Its leaves, stalks and berries often have a purple or maroon color. This tree is usually dioecious (male and female flowers on different trees) and birds are attracted by its tiny, dark purple berries. The specific name 'melanophloeos' means 'black bark' and resulted from a mistaken identification of the source tree as Swartbas (Diospyros whyteana).

== Cultivation ==
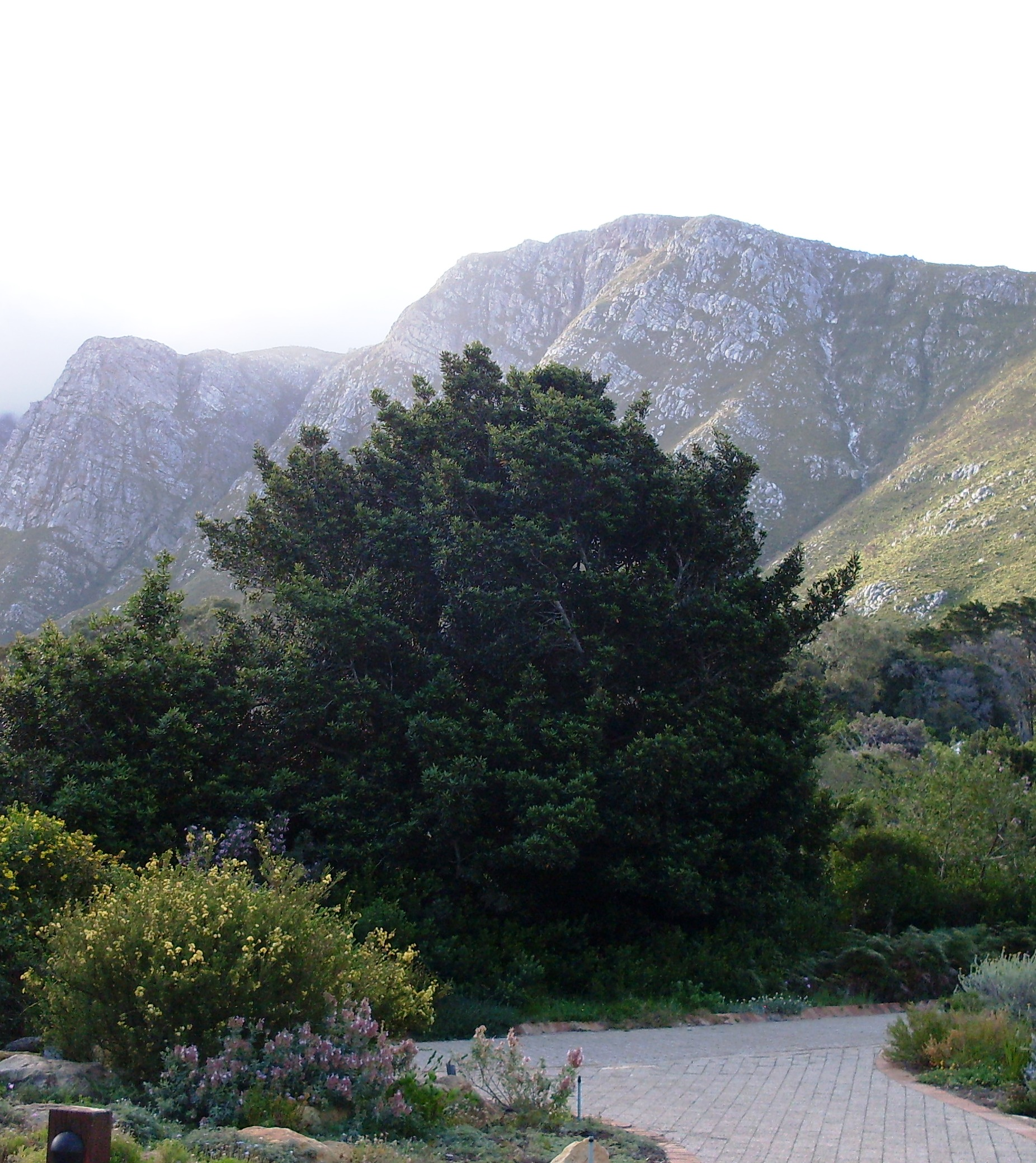
Myrsine melanophloeos tree in Harold Porter National Botanical Garden.

Myrsine melanophloeos is cultivated as an ornamental tree and screening shrub in gardens, and as a potted bonsai specimen. It is hardy and grows well in windy areas and near the coast. Once established, the plant is reasonably drought tolerant and has low maintenance needs.

The plant sends up suckers from its roots that eventually become new trees, and so is best not planted adjacent to paving. Rapanea grows easily from seed.

The wood is strong and of good quality that can be turned into furniture and violins.

== Gallery ==
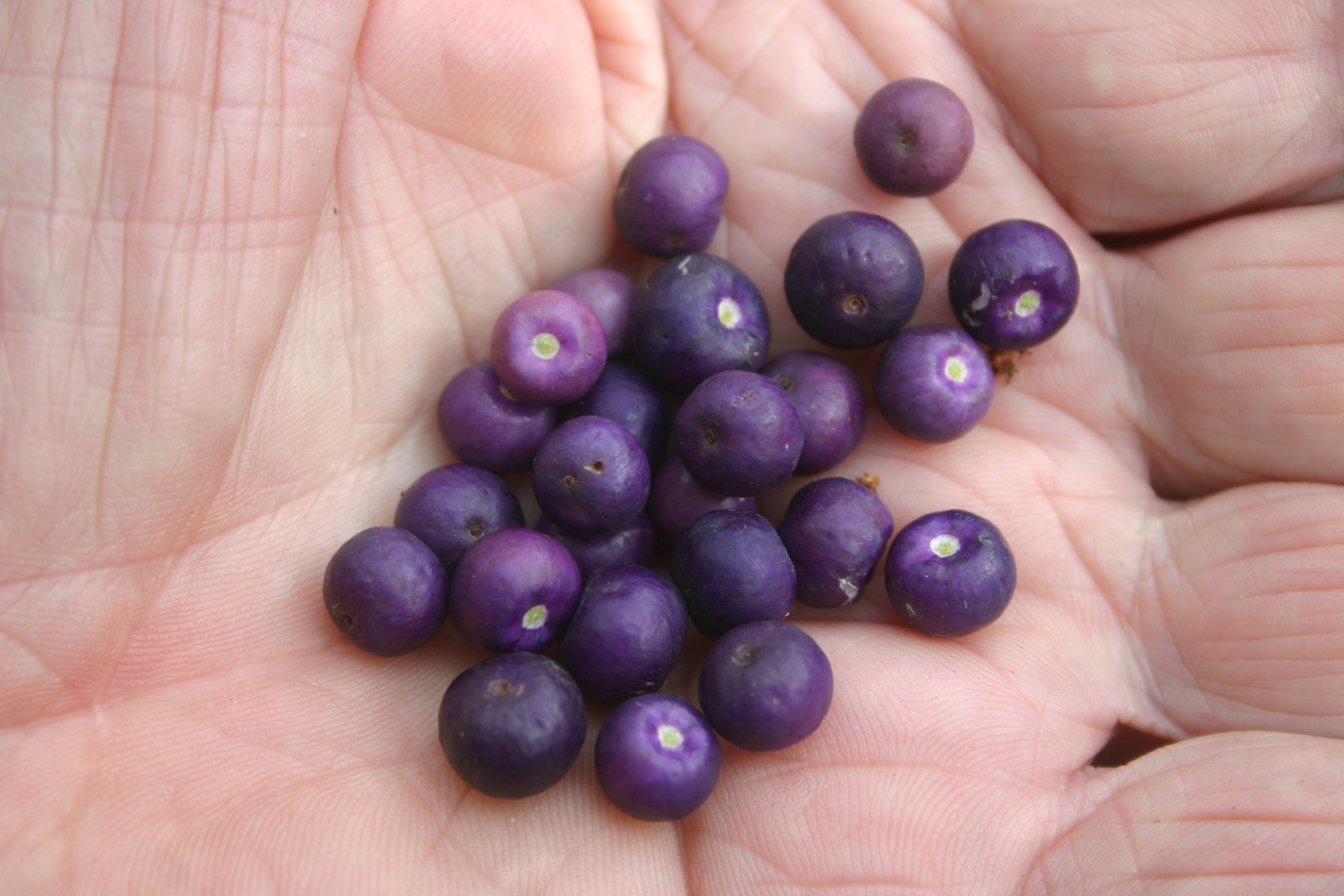
Fruits

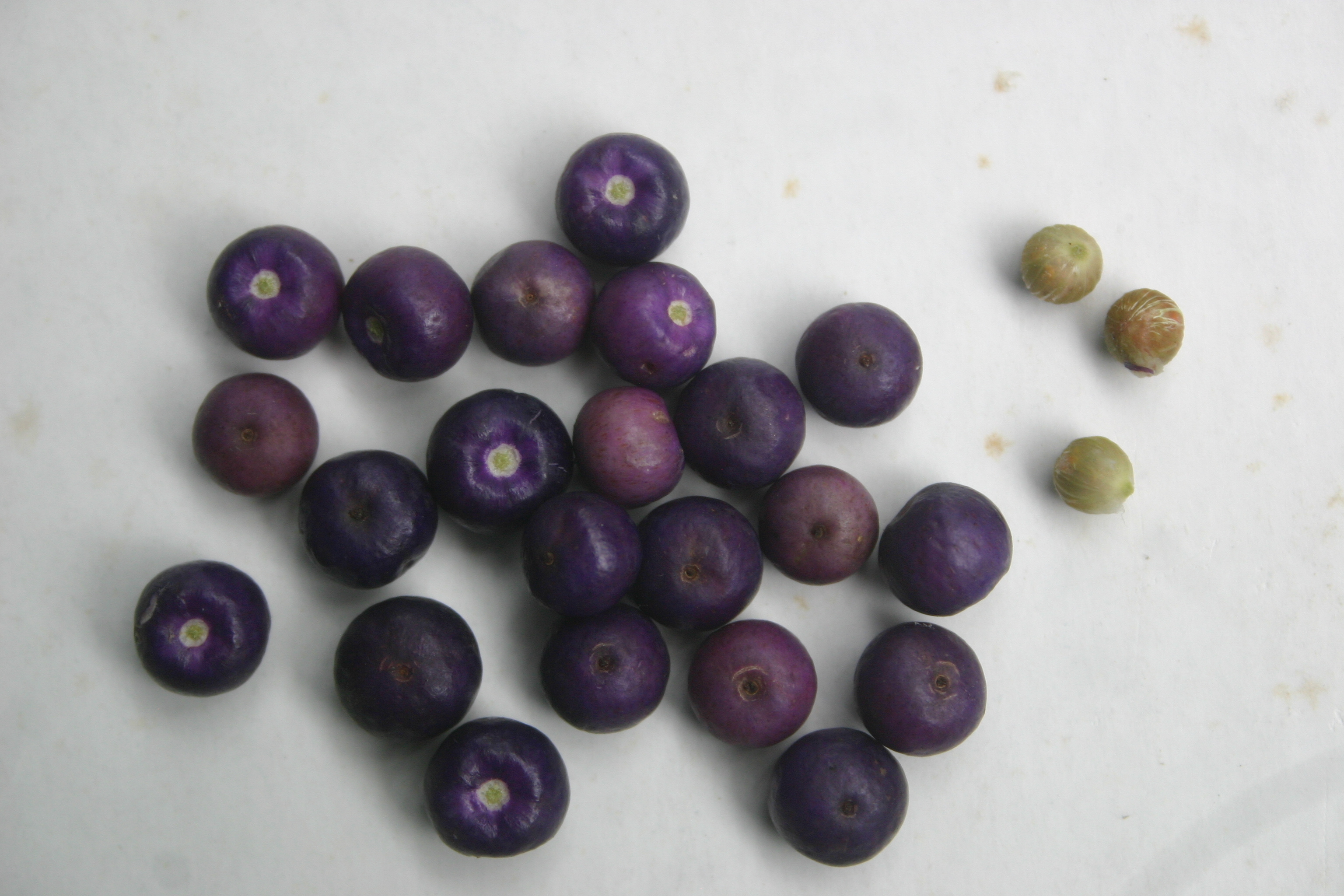
Fruits and seeds
