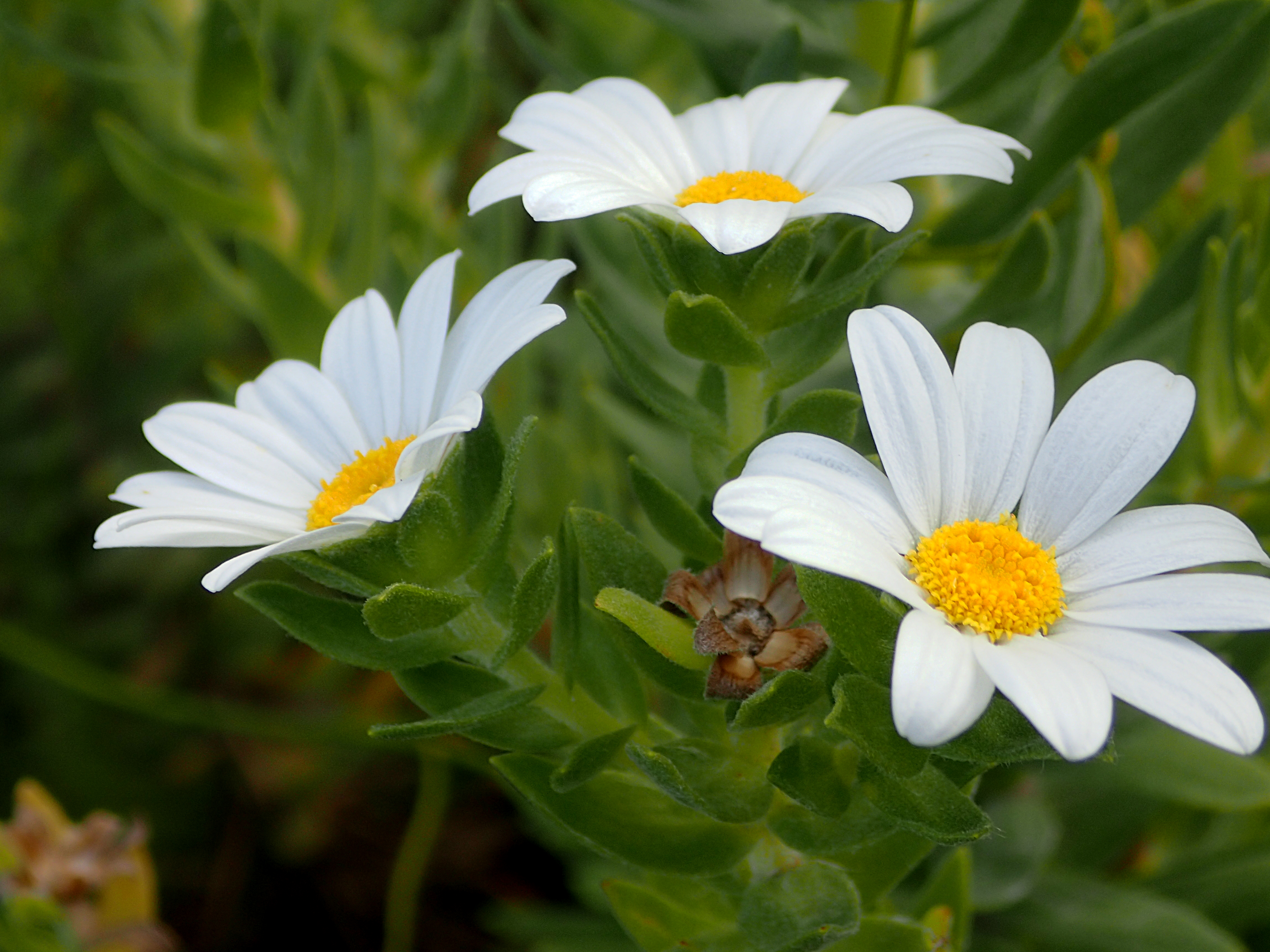
- Osmitopsis asteriscoides

Scientific classification
- Kingdom: Plantae
- Clade: Tracheophytes
- Clade: Angiosperms
- Clade: Eudicots
- Clade: Asterids
- Order: Asterales
- Family: Asteraceae
- Subfamily: Asteroideae
- Tribe: Anthemideae
- Genus: Osmitopsis; Cass.

Type species
- Osmites asteriscoides L.
- Osmitopsis is native to South Africa

Synonyms
- Bellidiastrum Less.; Bellidiopsis (DC.) Spach; Spanotrichum E.Mey. ex DC.

= Osmitopsis =

Swamp Daisies

Genus of flowering plants

Osmitopsis is a genus of African flowering plants in the chamomile tribe within the daisy family. The flowers in this genus are known as swamp daisies. It is endemic to the Cape Provinces of South Africa.

== Taxonomy ==
=== Species ===
Osmitopsis has nine accepted species:

- Osmitopsis afra (L.) K.Bremer
- Osmitopsis asteriscoides (L.) Less.
- Osmitopsis dentata (Thunb.) K.Bremer
- Osmitopsis glabra K.Bremer
- Osmitopsis nana Schltr.
- Osmitopsis osmitoides (Less.) K.Bremer
- Osmitopsis parvifolia (DC.) Hofmeyr
- Osmitopsis pinnatifida (DC.) K.Bremer
- Osmitopsis tenuis K.Bremer
