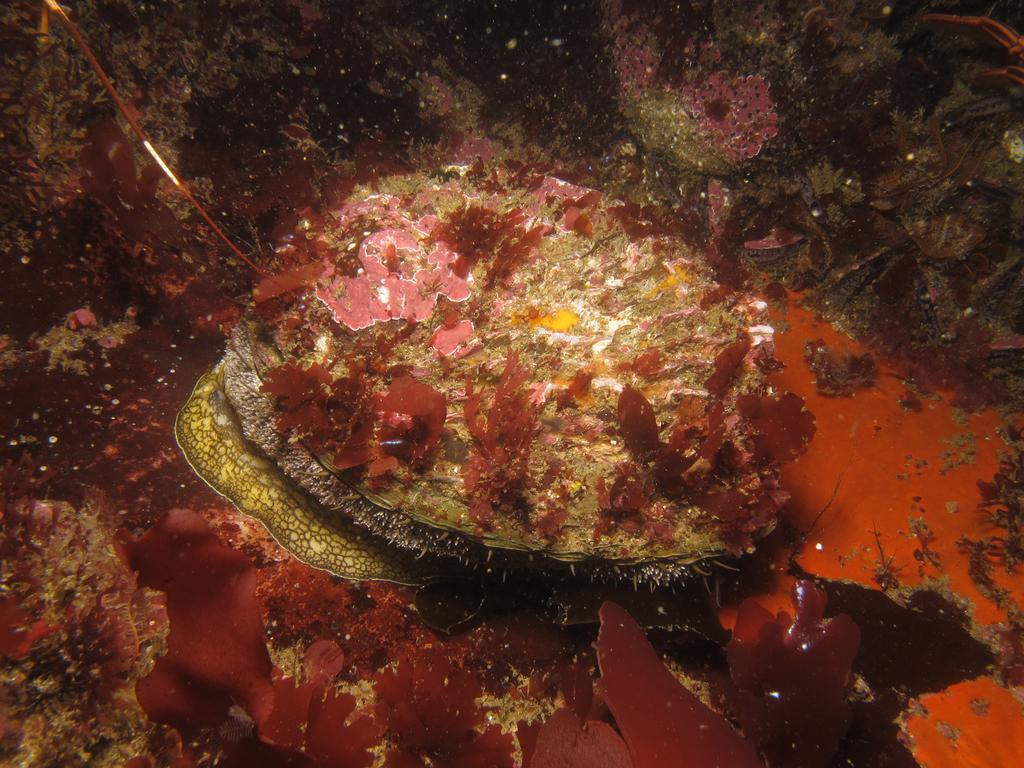
- Live individual of H. midae in situ
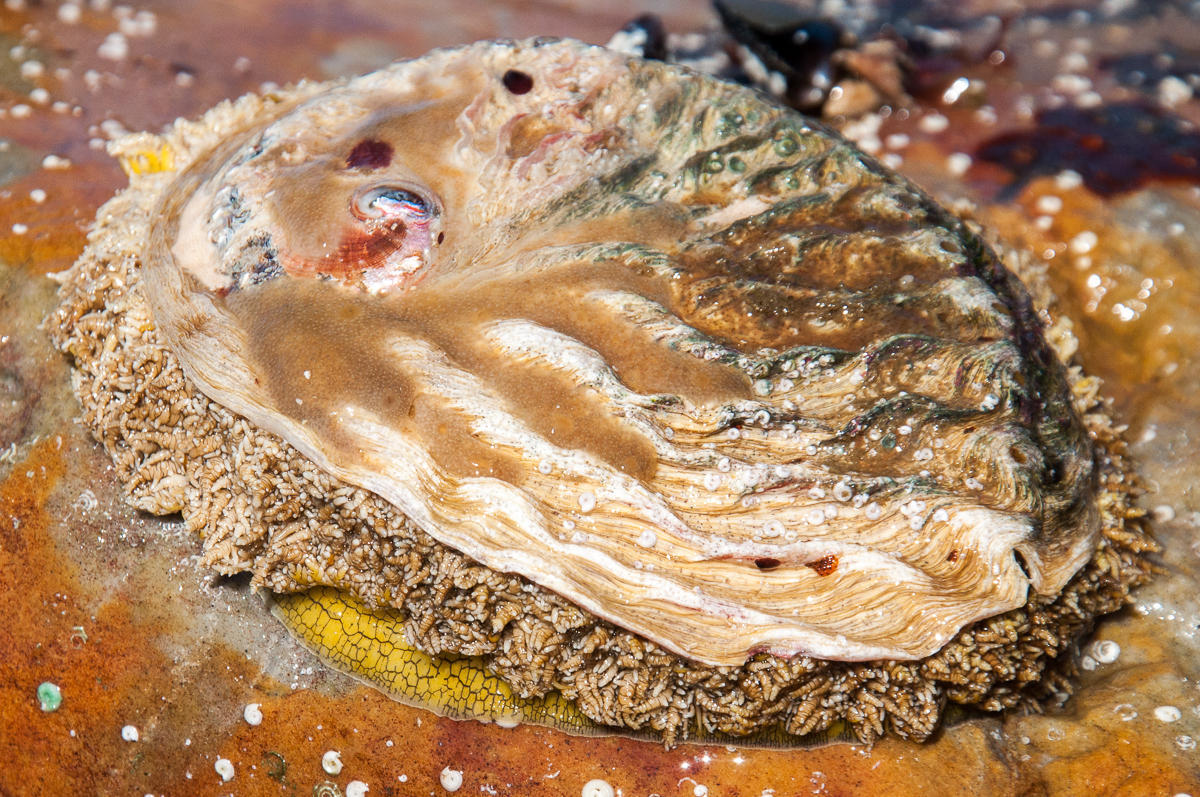

Conservation status
- Endangered (IUCN 3.1)

Scientific classification
- Kingdom: Animalia
- Phylum: Mollusca
- Class: Gastropoda
- Subclass: Vetigastropoda
- Order: Lepetellida
- Superfamily: Haliotoidea
- Family: Haliotidae
- Genus: Haliotis
- Species: H. midae

Binomial name
- Haliotis midae Linnaeus, 1758
- Extant (resident)

Synonyms
- Haliotis capensis Dunker, 1844; Haliotis elatior Pilsbry, 1890; Haliotis midas eliator Pilsbry, 1890

= Haliotis midae =

Species of gastropod endemic to South Africa

Haliotis midae, known commonly as the South African abalone or the perlemoen, is a species of large sea snail, a marine gastropod mollusk in the family Haliotidae, the abalone.

It is highly sought after by criminal organisations and a thriving black market exists for it, leading to a catastrophic decline in stocks.

== Subspecies ==
- Haliotis midae volcanius Patamakanthin & Eng, 2007

== Description ==
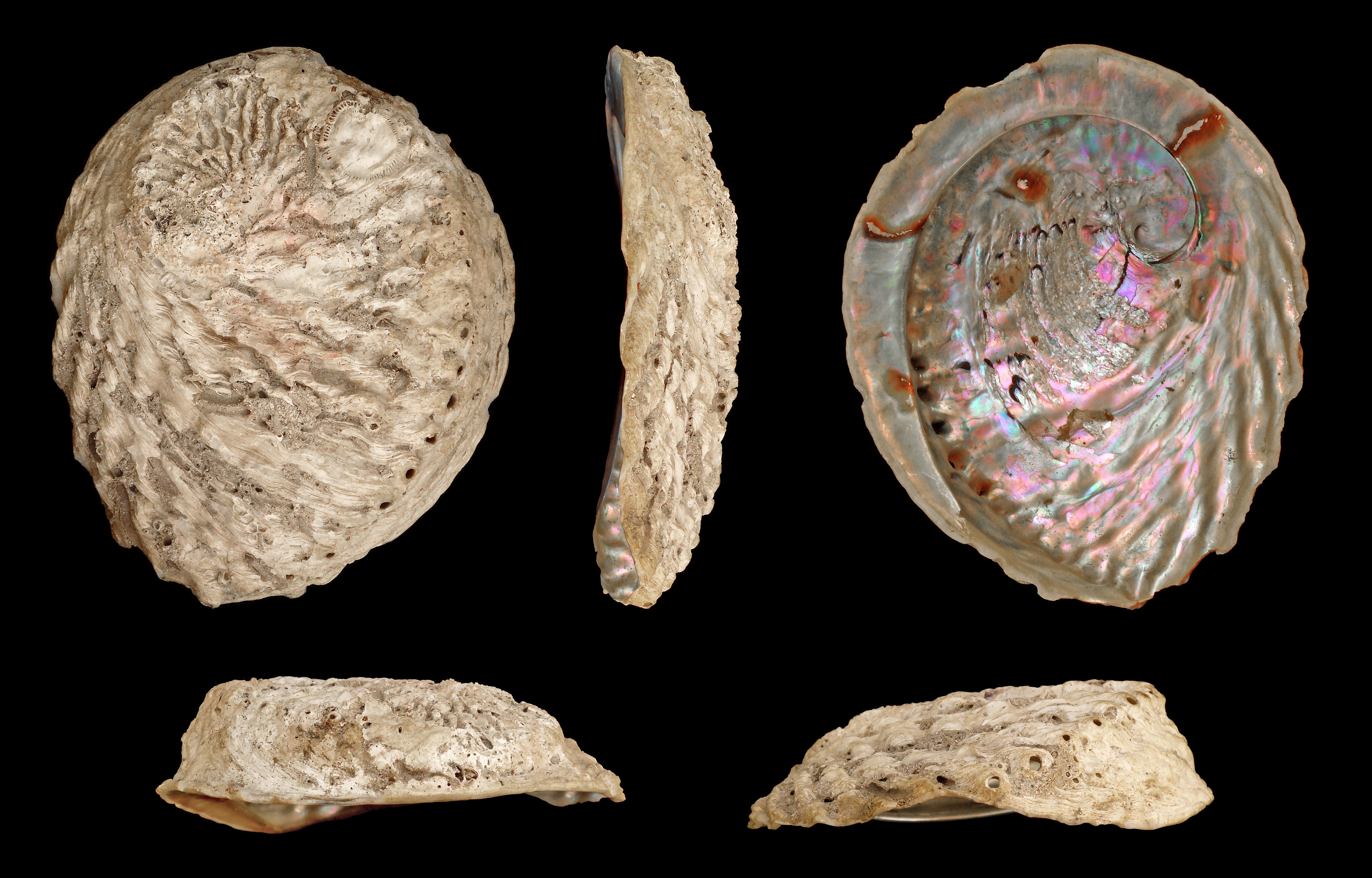
Five views of a shell of Haliotis midae

The size of the shell varies between 12 and 20 cm (4.7–7.9 in). "The large shell has a rounded-oval shape and is moderately convex. The distance of the apex from the margin about equals one-fifth the greatest length of the shell. The body whorl is strongly angled at the position of the perforations, perpendicularly descending from the angle to the columellar margin. The surface shows strong, elevated, radiating wrinkles or lamellae, but no spiral markings when adult. The 6 to 11 perforations are small, subcircular, and separated by spaces greater than their own diameter. The two sides are about equally curved. The convexity varies with age. The colour of the shell is yellowish-grey. The folds are usually stained with coral-red. The surface is dull, with fine oblique growth-wrinkles and coarse, prominent, less oblique elevated and wavy radiating lamellae. The low spire is composed of about 3 whorls. The body whorl is angulated at the row of perforations. The inner surface is pearly, many-coloured, red predominating in young specimens. The muscle-scar is large, rounded, very rough, especially in old shells, which often have coppery stains inside. The columellar plate is rather broad (one-seventh to one-tenth the width of the shell), sloping inward. Its face is a little concave and not at all truncated at the base. The cavity of the spire is large, showing about 1½ whorls from below."

== Behaviour ==
H. midae live in groups. Juveniles integrate with sea urchins for protection.

=== Feeding ===
H. midae are herbivores, feeding on kelp and red and green algae.

== Distribution ==
Haliotis midae is endemic to the waters off South Africa.

== Conservation status ==
H. midae is endangered due to severe overfishing from uncontrolled poaching driven by consumer demand in East Asia; 90% of exports go to Hong Kong. Numerous East Asian poaching gangs have created an organised criminal enterprise in conjunction with local criminals and fishers, leading to a catastrophic decline in the species. These organisations are closely linked to the international narcotics trade. In most areas of former abundance, evidence indicates that populations have not been able to keep up with the level of poaching, leading to recruitment failure.

From 2000 to 2016, 55 863 tonnes were exported, with 18 905 tonnes being legal exports and 36 958 tonnes in illegal exports.

The threat to the perlemoen led it to being banned from all types of harvesting and listed on CITES and the National Environmental Management: Biodiversity Act 10 of 2004 (NEMBA); it was later removed from both registers due to pressure from the fishing industry.

Permits are required to harvest and to export the perlemoen.

== Gallery ==
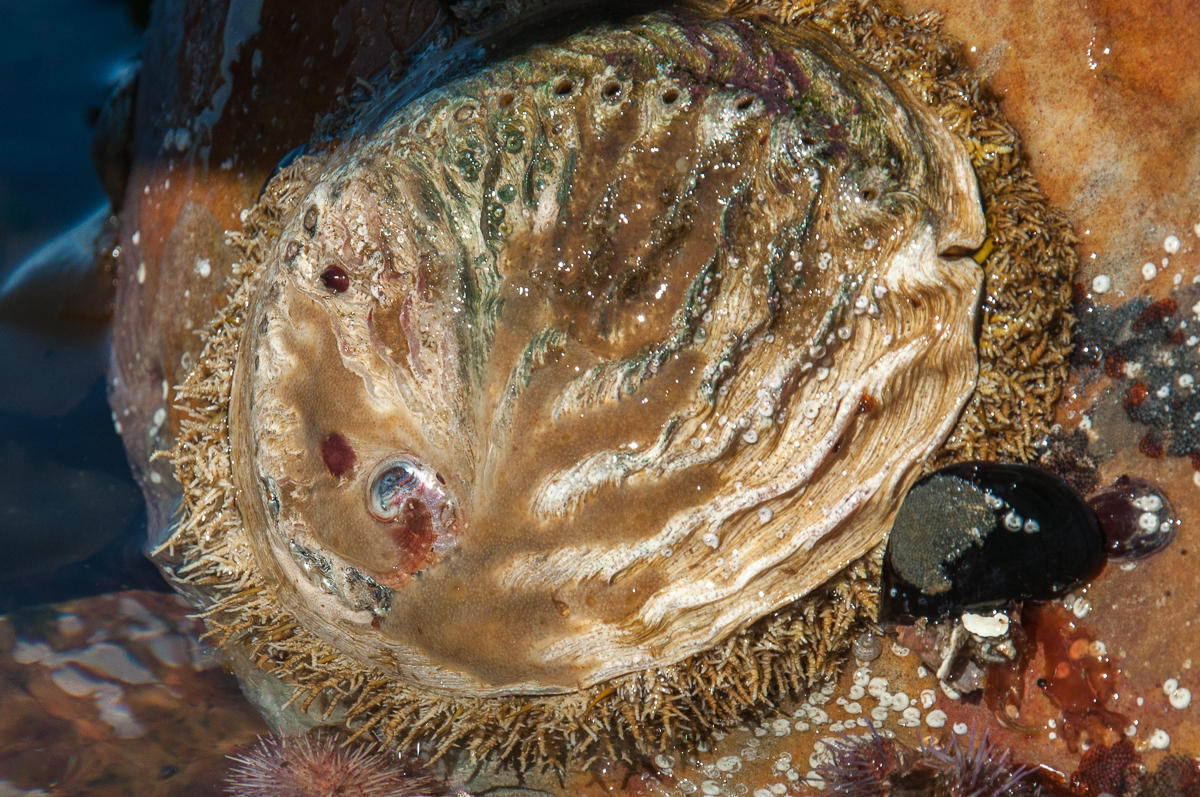

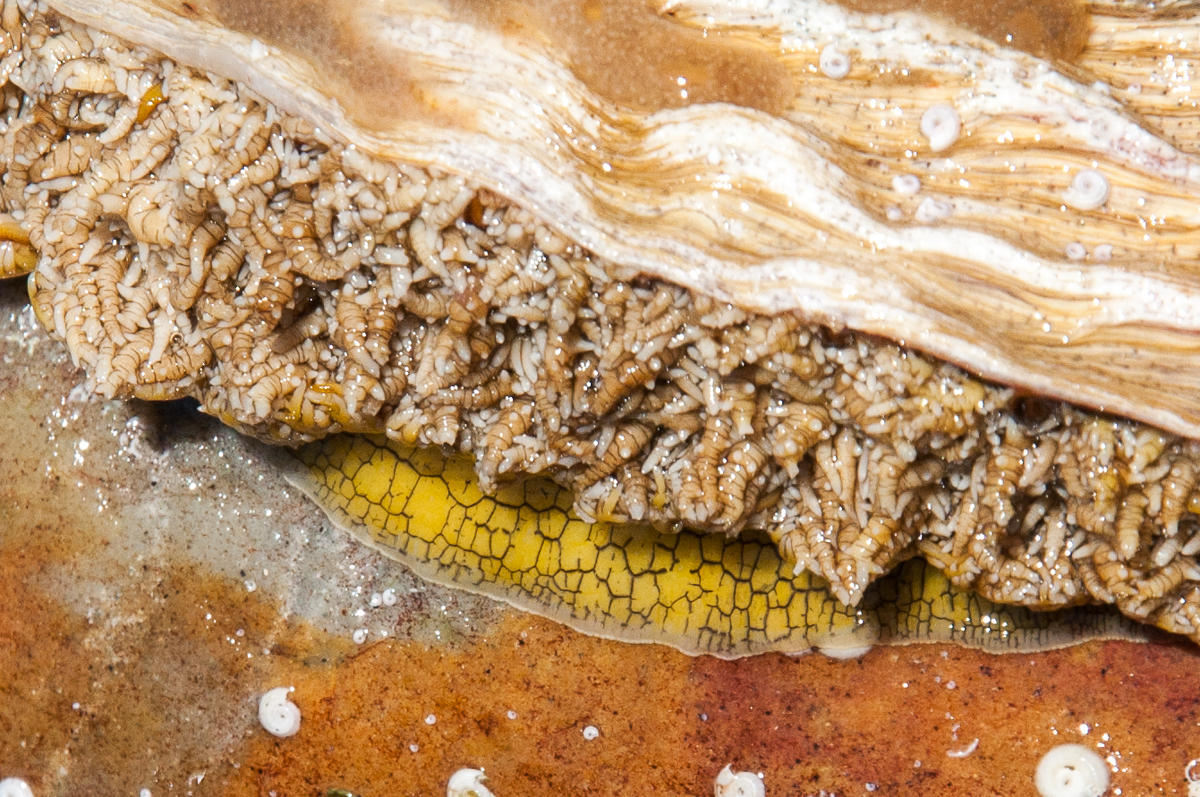

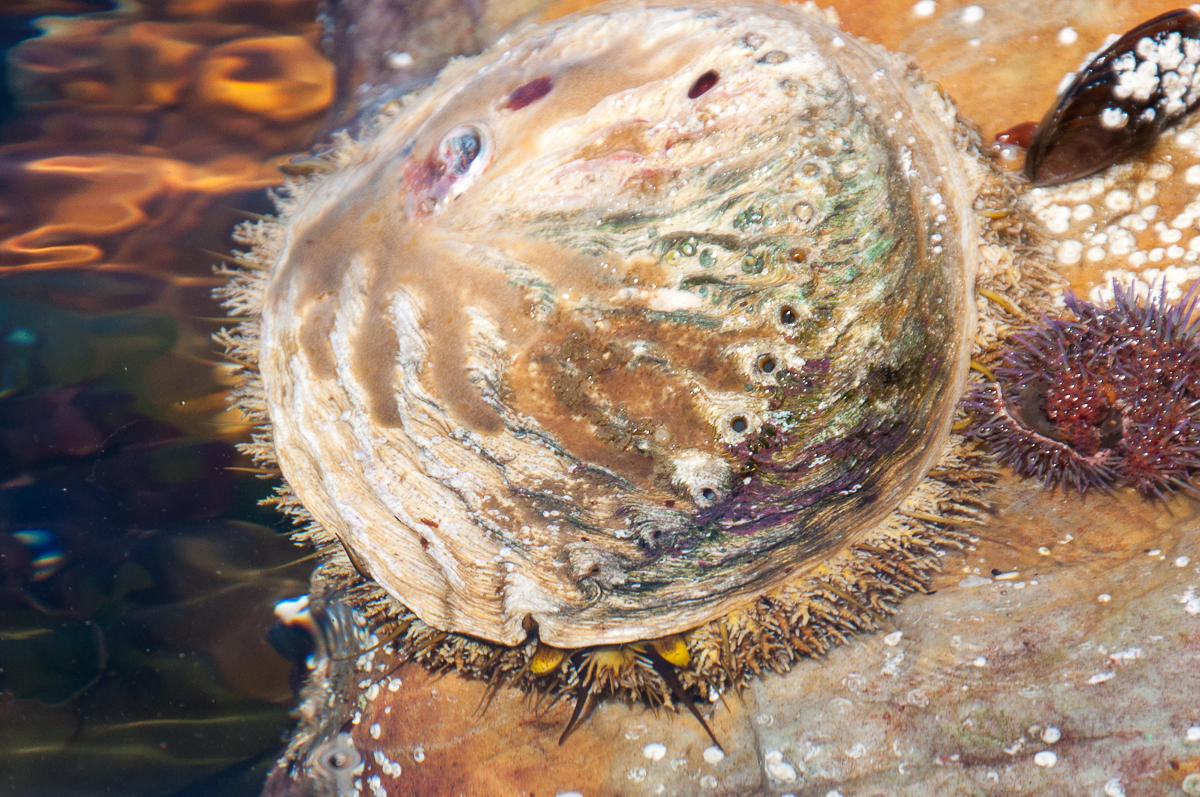
