= Pringle Bay =

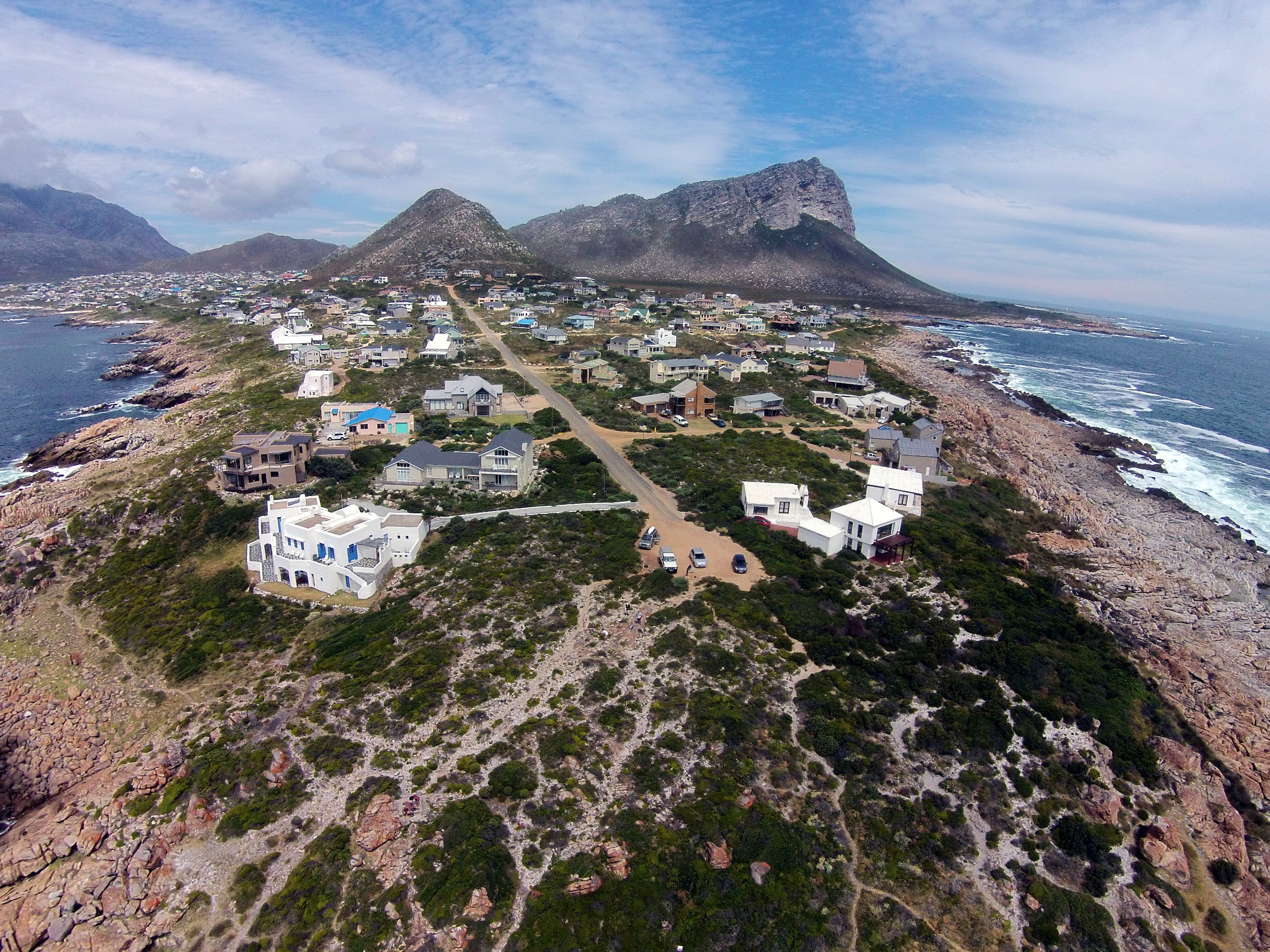
- Aerial view of Pringle Bay.

- Location within Western Cape Location within South Africa
- Coordinates: 34°21′S 18°49′E
- Country: South Africa
- Province: Western Cape
- District: Overberg
- Municipality: Overstrand

Area
  - Total: 3.26 km^{2} (1.26 sq mi)

Population (2011)
  - Total: 801
  - Density: 246/km^{2} (636/sq mi)

Racial makeup (2011)
  - Black African: 8.0%
  - Coloured: 5.5%
  - White: 84.0%
  - Other: 2.5%

First languages (2011)
  - English: 50.5%
  - Afrikaans: 44.3%
  - Other: 5.2%
- Time zone: UTC+2 (SAST)
- PO box: 7196
- Area code: 028

Pringle Bay (Afrikaans: Pringlebaai) is a small, coastal village in the Overberg region of the Western Cape, in South Africa. It is situated at the foot of Hangklip, on the opposite side of False Bay from Cape Point. The town and surroundings are part of the Kogelberg Biosphere Reserve, a UNESCO Heritage Site. The bay is named after Rear-Admiral Thomas Pringle, of the Royal Navy, who commanded the naval station at the Cape in the late 1790s.

Situated between Betty's Bay and Gordon's Bay, many of the houses in the small community are only used as holiday houses by their owners. It is accessed by the R44, which connects it to the N2.

Pringle Bay is well known for the Hangklip (hanging rock) that leans out to sea and marks the eastern end of False Bay. The Hangklip Mountain at 484m above sea level is packed with numerous natural caves, and was once a refuge for bandits and slaves escaping their Dutch masters, hence the mountain cave being named "Drostersgat" - Deserters Cave.
