= Betty's Bay =

Resort town in Western Cape, South Africa

Betty's Bay Bettysbaai
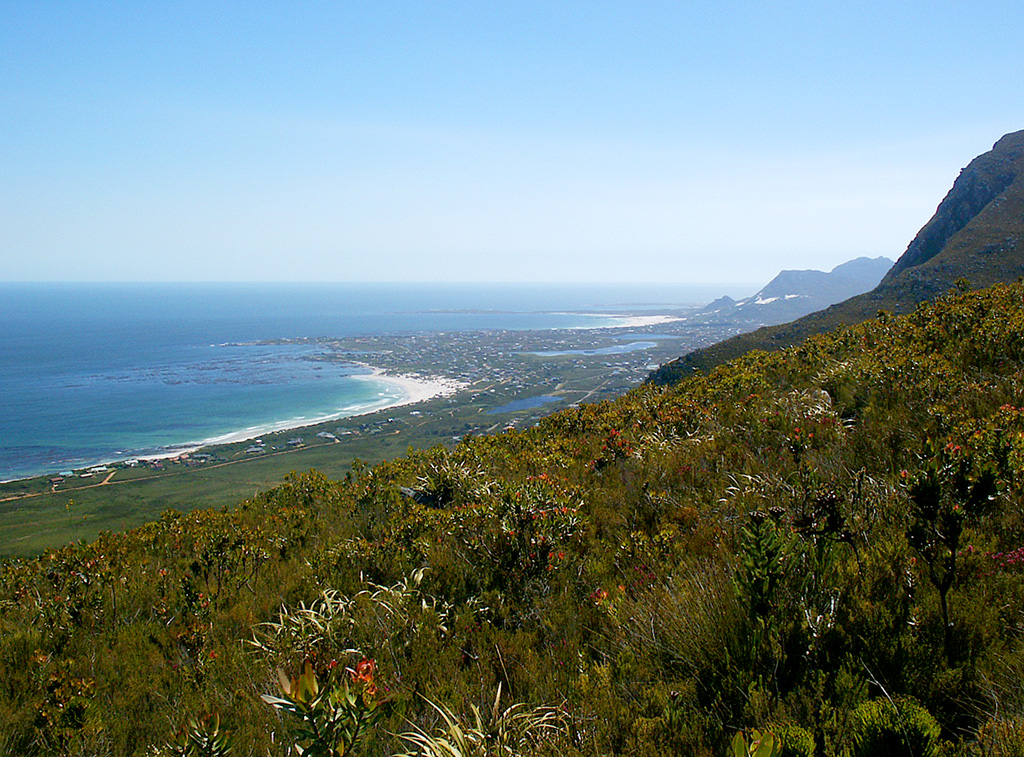
- Betty's Bay

- Location within Western Cape Location within South Africa
- Coordinates: 34.363°S 18.885°E
- Country: South Africa
- Province: Western Cape
- District: Overberg
- Municipality: Overstrand

Area
  - Total: 20.99 km^{2} (8.10 sq mi)

Population (2011)
  - Total: 1,381
  - Density: 65.79/km^{2} (170.4/sq mi)

Racial makeup (2011)
  - Black African: 3.7%
  - Coloured: 21.1%
  - Indian/Asian: 0.3%
  - White: 72.6%
  - Other: 2.3%

First languages (2011)
  - Afrikaans: 60.5%
  - English: 36.5%
  - Other: 3.0%
- Time zone: UTC+2 (SAST)
- PO box: 7141
- Area code: 028

Betty's Bay is a small holiday town situated on the Overberg coast of South Africa's Western Cape province. It is located 100 km from Cape Town beneath the Kogelberg Mountains on the scenic R44 ocean drive between Pringle Bay and Kleinmond. This village stretches over 13 km along the coast. Tourism plays a large role in the town's economy due to its popularity with holiday makers from across the Western Cape and Cape Town in particular.

During colonial times Betty's Bay was allegedly a favourite place for runaway slaves, and in 1912 Betty's Bay became a formal whaling station running up until the 1930s. Remains of the whaling station can still be seen at Stony Point.

Bettys Bay is named after Betty Youlden, daughter of the first developer of the area Arthur Youlden.

Betty's Bay contains the Harold Porter National Botanical Garden as well as an African penguin colony in the Betty's Bay Marine Protected Area, which is one of the two Penguin colonies in the area of the Western Cape. The colony is situated in the Kogelberg and Stony Point Nature Reserve. When the former whaling station was closed, the endemic and endangered Southern African penguins started breeding here.

Penguin Colony Betty's Bay

== Geography ==
Due to the town's location on the south-western coast and surrounding mountainous geography it receives near constant wind and ample rain throughout the year, With south-easterly winds bringing the occasional thunderstorm from the warmer eastern coast in summer, while winter brings persistent North-westerly to occasional Southerly frontal rain, sometimes hail, which can be very heavy at times.

Betty's Bay has a warm Mediterranean climate (Köppen: Csb) with relatively strong marine west coast oceanic climate (Köppen Cfb) influence for the region, which sees pleasant warm temperatures in summer, and mild to cool temperatures in winter with the threat of rain throughout the year.

Climate data for Betty's Bay
Month	Jan	Feb	Mar	Apr	May	Jun	Jul	Aug	Sep	Oct	Nov	Dec	Year
Mean daily maximum °C (°F)	23.1 (73.6)	23.3 (73.9)	22.1 (71.8)	20 (68)	17.7 (63.9)	15.7 (60.3)	15.2 (59.4)	15.2 (59.4)	16.3 (61.3)	18.4 (65.1)	19.8 (67.6)	21.9 (71.4)	19.1 (66.3)
Daily mean °C (°F)	20 (68)	20.1 (68.2)	18.9 (66.0)	16.9 (62.4)	15 (59)	13.1 (55.6)	12.5 (54.5)	12.6 (54.7)	13.5 (56.3)	15.4 (59.7)	16.8 (62.2)	18.9 (66.0)	16.1 (61.1)
Mean daily minimum °C (°F)	17.3 (63.1)	17.5 (63.5)	16.4 (61.5)	14.4 (57.9)	12.7 (54.9)	10.7 (51.3)	10.1 (50.2)	10.1 (50.2)	10.9 (51.6)	12.7 (54.9)	14.2 (57.6)	16.2 (61.2)	13.6 (56.5)
Average precipitation mm (inches)	24.7 (0.97)	39.3 (1.55)	91.7 (3.61)	79.7 (3.14)	112.5 (4.43)	218.5 (8.60)	145.8 (5.74)	159.2 (6.27)	95.5 (3.76)	48.7 (1.92)	68.2 (2.69)	46.5 (1.83)	1,130.3 (44.51)
Average precipitation days (≥ 0.1mm)	5	9	9.5	6.5	12	13	11.5	10.5	11.5	8.5	9	9.5	115.5
Source: https://www.bettysbay.info/awarenessheading/rainfall https://en.climate-data.org/africa/south-africa/western-cape/betty-s-bay-9162/

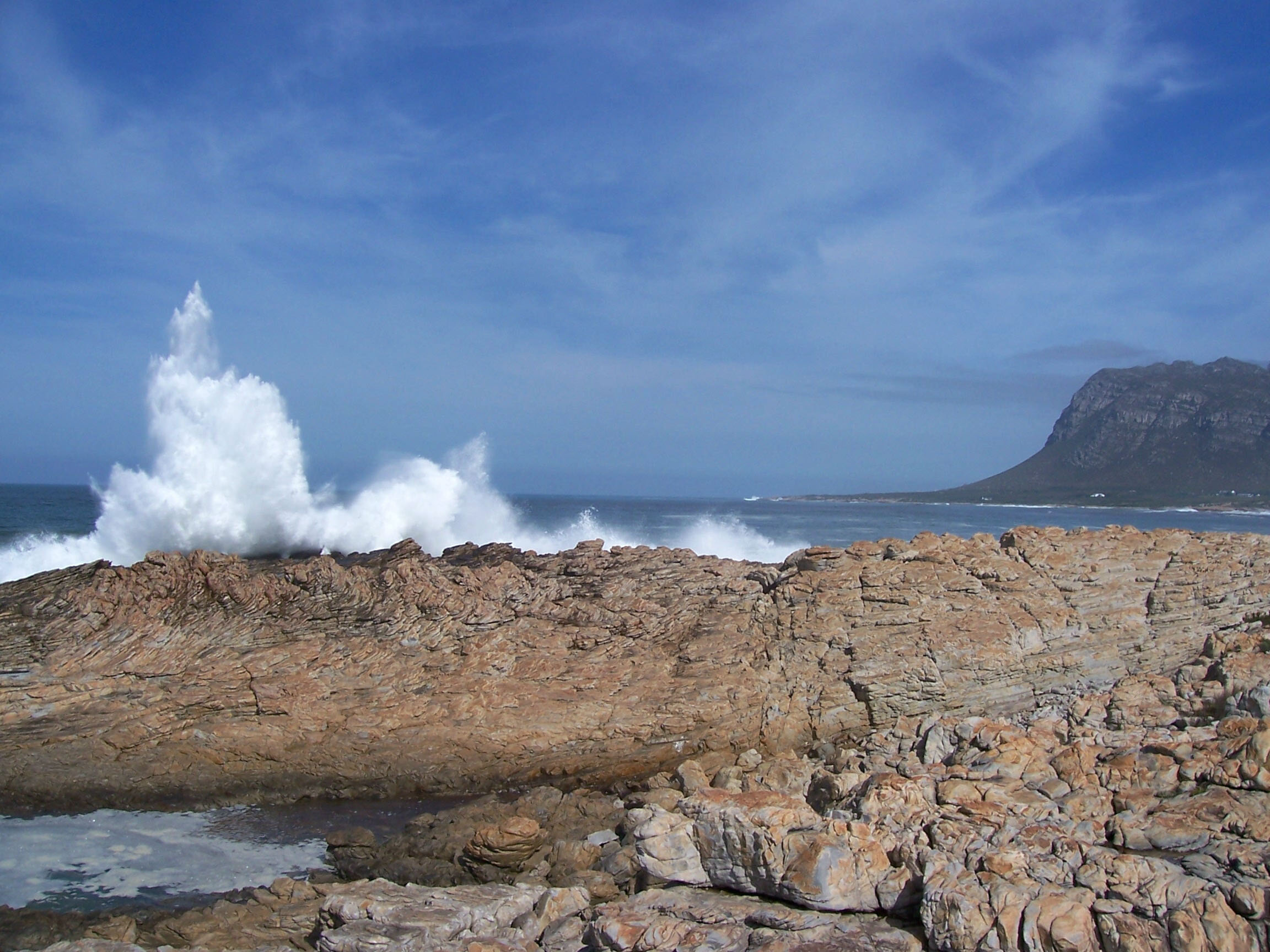
Betty's Bay coastline near the Palmiet River mouth
