= Trobriand Islands rain forests =

Rain forest area in Papua New Guinea

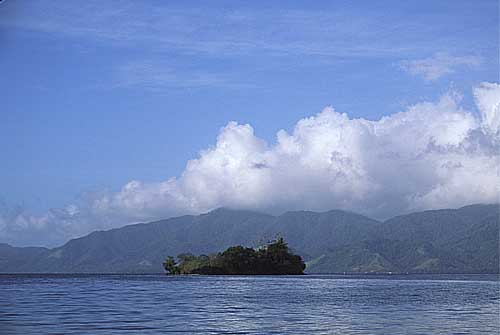
- Fergusson Island from the sea

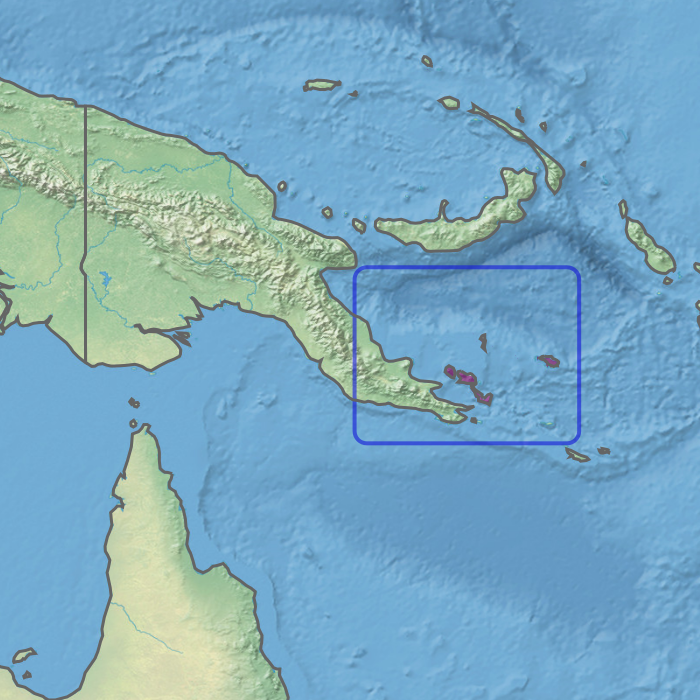
- Ecoregion territory (in purple)

Ecology
- Realm: Australasian
- Biome: tropical and subtropical moist broadleaf forests

Geography
- Area: 4,662 km^{2} (1,800 sq mi)
- Country: Papua New Guinea
- Province: Milne Bay Province
- Coordinates: 9.53°S 150.66°E

Conservation
- Conservation status: vulnerable
- Protected: 259 km² (6%)

The Trobriand Islands rain forests are a tropical moist broadleaf forest ecoregion of southeastern Papua New Guinea.

The islands of this ecoregion have been separated from mainland New Guinea since the Late Pleistocene, and much of the biota is unique, including four mammal species and two birds-of-paradise plant species. The ecoregion covers 1,600 square miles (4,100 km^{2}).

== Geography ==
The ecoregion includes several island groups lying east of the eastern peninsula of the island of New Guinea, within Milne Bay Province, including the d'Entrecasteaux Islands and Trobriand Islands archipelagoes, and Woodlark Island. The largest portion of the ecoregion and the nearest to the New Guinea mainland is made up of three principal islands of the d'Entrecasteaux group: Goodenough Island, Fergusson Island, and Normanby Island.

== Flora ==
The Trobriand Islands and Woodlark Island consist primarily of lowland rain forest on limestone substrates. Goodenough, Fergusson, and Normanby Islands consist mainly of lowland rain forest on acid soil.

The major rain forest tree genera include Pometia, Octomeles, Alstonia, Campnosperma, Canarium, Dracontomelon, Pterocymbium, Cryptocarya, Intsia, Ficus, and Terminalia.
Tree species include:

- Alstonia breviloba
- Alstonia rubiginosa
- Canarium vitiense
- Dracontomelon dao
- Intsia bijuga
- Octomeles sumatrana
- Pometia pinnata
- Terminalia catappa

== Fauna ==
Animal species native to the ecoregion include:

- Echymipera davidi
- Phalanger lullulae
- Dorcopsis atrata
- Dactylopsila tatei
- Nyctimene major
- Kerivoula agnella
- Pipistrellus collinus
- Chiruromys forbesi
- Greater tree mouse
- Island tube-nosed fruit bat
- Woodlark Cuscus

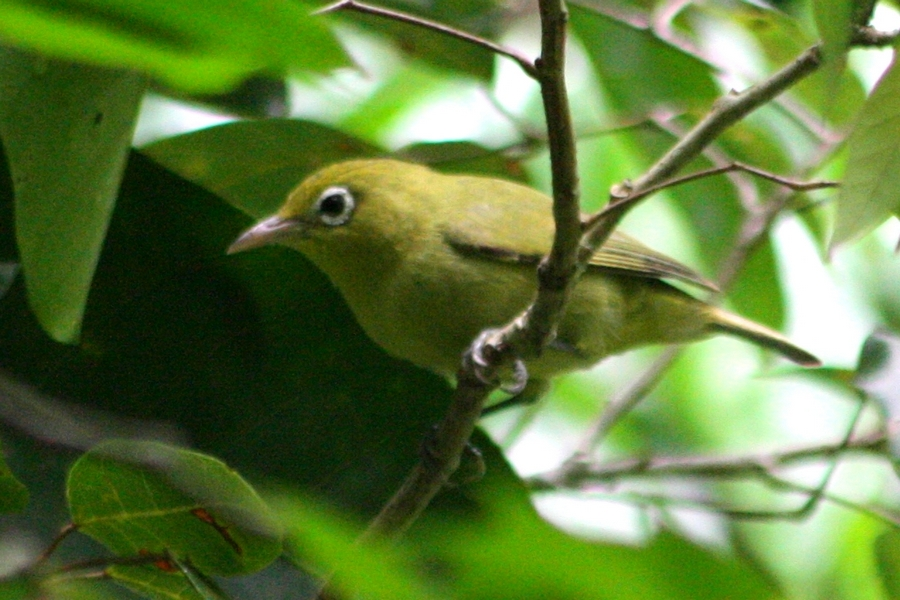
Louisiade white-eye (Zosterops griseotinctus) on Duchess Island, d'Entrecasteaux Islands

The ecoregion corresponds to the D'Entrecasteaux and Trobriand Islands endemic bird area. There are two endemic bird-of-paradise species, the curl-crested manucode (Manucodia comrii) and Goldie's bird-of-paradise (Paradisaea decora).

== Conservation and threats ==
The main threats to the ecoregion include logging by foreign companies and conversion of habitat into agricultural lands.
