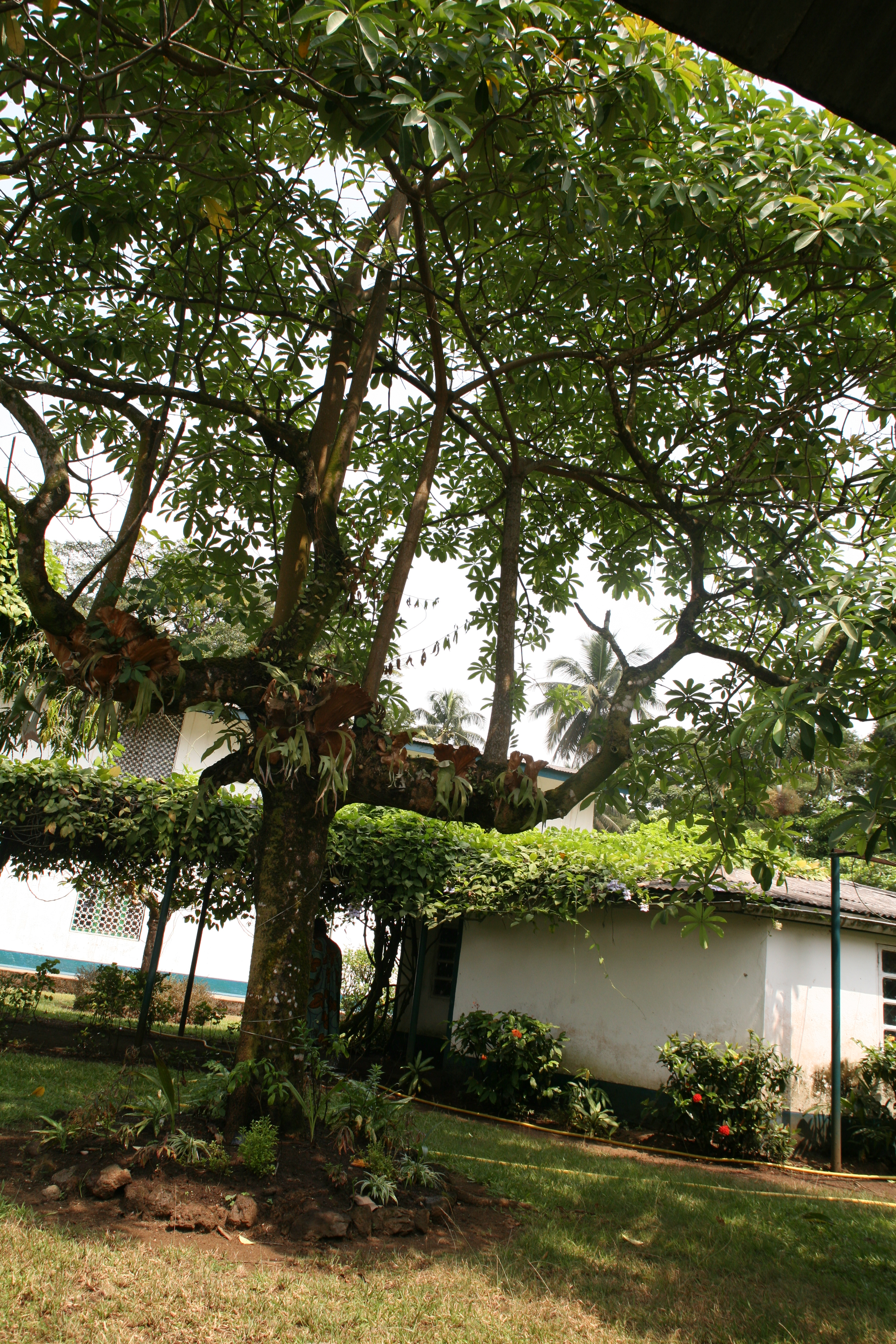

Conservation status
- Least Concern (IUCN 3.1)

Scientific classification
- Kingdom: Plantae
- Clade: Tracheophytes
- Clade: Angiosperms
- Clade: Eudicots
- Clade: Asterids
- Order: Gentianales
- Family: Apocynaceae
- Genus: Alstonia
- Species: A. congensis

Binomial name
- Alstonia congensis Engl.

Synonyms
- Alstonia congensis var. glabrata Hutch. & Dalziel; Alstonia gilletii De Wild. Alstonia pedicellata Pierre ex A.Chev.

= Alstonia congensis =

Species of plant

Alstonia congensis, is a tree within the Apocynaceae family and one of two African species within the Alstonia genus, the other being the Alstonia boonei De Wild. Both have similar morphological characteristics.

The root and stem bark contains the alkaloids echitamine and echitamidine.

== Description ==
The species can grow as high as 30 meters tall, trunk is cylindrical; bark, smooth or scaly, brown - yellow. Leaves, between 4 and 8 together in verticillate arrangement, petiole, 0-0.5 cm long; leaf-blade, obovate to narrowly obovate in outline, glaucous or coriaceous upper surface, duller beneath, acuminate at apex and decurrent into the base. Flower: sepals, glabrous or sparsely pubescent, pale green.

== Distribution ==
Occurs in West Tropical Africa and parts of Central Africa, particularly the Democratic Republic of Congo, grows in high forest and freshwater swamp forest.

== Uses ==
Leaf and root bark extracts used in the topical treatment of rheumatic pains, root extracts used in decoction to treat mild malaria fever.
