= A. penangiana =

A. penangiana may refer to:

- Abacopteris penangiana, a synonym for Menisciopsis penangiana, a fern species
- Acampe penangiana, a synonym for Acampe rigida, an orchid species
- Alstonia penangiana, a plant species endemic to Malaysia
- Atuna penangiana, a plant species endemic to Malaysia
