= Alstonia annamensis =

Conservation status
- Endangered (IUCN 3.1)

Scientific classification
- Kingdom: Plantae
- Clade: Tracheophytes
- Clade: Angiosperms
- Clade: Eudicots
- Clade: Asterids
- Order: Gentianales
- Family: Apocynaceae
- Genus: Alstonia
- Species: A. annamensis

Binomial name
- Alstonia annamensis (Monach.) Sidiyasa

Synonyms
- Alstonia angustifolia var. annamensis Monach.

Species of tree

Alstonia annamensis is a species of flowering plant in the family Apocynaceae. It is a tree native to Cambodia and Vietnam. In Vietnam it native to Khánh Hòa and Ninh Thuận provinces, where it grows in tropical dry forest from 600 to 1,800 meters elevation.

It was first described as a variety of Alstonia angustifolia, Alstonia angustifolia var. annamensis, by Joseph Vincent Monachino in 1949. In 1998 Kade Sidiyasa described it as a full species, Alstonia annamensis.
