= Macrocarpamine =

Names
- IUPAC name Methyl (8R,13E,14S,16S,17S,18S)-17-[(E)-2-[(1S,12S,13R,18R)-3,20-dimethyl-15-oxa-3,20-diazapentacyclo[10.7.1.0^{2,10}.0^{4,9}.0^{13,18}]icosa-2(10),4,6,8,16-pentaen-17-yl]ethenyl]-13-ethylidene-1,11-diazapentacyclo[12.3.1.0^{2,7}.0^{8,17}.0^{11,16}]octadeca-2,4,6-triene-18-carboxylate

Identifiers
| CAS Number | 66408-46-6 |
| 3D model (JSmol) | Interactive image |
| ChEMBL | ChEMBL1979029 |
| ChemSpider | 28496174 |
| PubChem CID | 5472477 |
- InChI: InChI=1S/C41H46N4O3/c1-5-24-21-44-17-15-32-27-11-7-9-13-34(27)45-39(40(46)47-4)29(24)20-37(44)41(32,45)16-14-25-22-48-23-31-28(25)18-36-38-30(19-35(31)42(36)2)26-10-6-8-12-33(26)43(38)3/h5-14,16,22,28-29,31-32,35-37,39H,15,17-21,23H2,1-4H3/b16-14+,24-5-/t28-,29-,31+,32+,35-,36-,37-,39-,41-/m0/s1 Key: NOKYQXVIWFQLED-HXCLOJFDSA-N
- SMILES: C/C=C\1/CN2CC[C@@H]3C4=CC=CC=C4N5[C@@]3([C@@H]2C[C@@H]1[C@H]5C(=O)OC)/C=C/C6=COC[C@@H]7[C@H]6C[C@H]8C9=C(C[C@@H]7N8C)C1=CC=CC=C1N9C

Properties
| Chemical formula | C_{41}H_{46}N_{4}O_{3} |
| Molar mass | 642.844 g·mol^{−1} |
- Except where otherwise noted, data are given for materials in their standard state (at 25 °C [77 °F], 100 kPa). Infobox references

Macrocarpamine is an Alstonia alkaloid with antiplasmodial activity.
