= Venenatine =

Names
- IUPAC name methyl (1R,15S,18R,19S,20S)-18-hydroxy-8-methoxy-1,3,11,12,14,15,16,17,18,19,20,21-dodecahydroyohimban-19-carboxylate

Identifiers
CAS Number	1055-75-0
3D model (JSmol)	Interactive image
ChEMBL	ChEMBL4752387
ChemSpider	65856
PubChem CID	73061
- InChI: InChI=1S/C22H28N2O4/c1-27-18-5-3-4-15-19(18)13-8-9-24-11-12-6-7-17(25)20(22(26)28-2)14(12)10-16(24)21(13)23-15/h3-5,12,14,16-17,20,23,25H,6-11H2,1-2H3/t12-,14+,16-,17-,20+/m1/s1 Key: WMMZYEBFJWWUJX-YCSGKXEJSA-N
- SMILES: COC1=CC=CC2=C1C3=C(N2)[C@H]4C[C@H]5[C@H](CC[C@H]([C@H]5C(=O)OC)O)CN4CC3

Properties
Chemical formula	C_{22}H_{28}N_{2}O_{4}
Molar mass	384.5

Hazards
- Lethal dose or concentration (LD, LC)
LD_{50} (median dose)	176 mg/kg (mouse, intraperitoneal)
- Except where otherwise noted, data are given for materials in their standard state (at 25 °C [77 °F], 100 kPa). Infobox references

Venenatine is an indole alkaloid that was first isolated from Alstonia venenata in 1964. It is also found in A. macrophylla and A. scholaris. It appears to have antifungal properties and has been synthesized. Venenatine inhibits the p300 histone acetyltransferase enzyme.
