= Boonein =

Names
- Preferred IUPAC name (4aS,6S,7R,7aS)-6-Hydroxy-7-methylhexahydrocyclopenta[c]pyran-1(3H)-one

Identifiers
CAS Number	85502-19-8
3D model (JSmol)	Interactive image
ChemSpider	10310759
PubChem CID	17747980
UNII	WC2BAD993T
CompTox Dashboard (EPA)	DTXSID601045528
- InChI: InChI=1S/C9H14O3/c1-5-7(10)4-6-2-3-12-9(11)8(5)6/h5-8,10H,2-4H2,1H3/t5-,6-,7-,8+/m0/s1 Key: WJMOFJJTTHNUOH-DKXJUACHSA-N
- SMILES: O=C1OCC[C@H]2C[C@H](O)[C@H](C)[C@@H]12

Properties
Chemical formula	C_{9}H_{14}O_{3}
Molar mass	170.208 g·mol^{−1}
- Except where otherwise noted, data are given for materials in their standard state (at 25 °C [77 °F], 100 kPa). Infobox references

Boonein is an iridoid isolated from Alstonia boonei, a medicinal tree of West Africa.
