= Alstonia spatulata =

Conservation status
- Least Concern (IUCN 3.1)

Scientific classification
- Kingdom: Plantae
- Clade: Tracheophytes
- Clade: Angiosperms
- Clade: Eudicots
- Clade: Asterids
- Order: Gentianales
- Family: Apocynaceae
- Genus: Alstonia
- Species: A. spatulata

Binomial name
- Alstonia spatulata Blume

Synonyms
- Alstonia cochinchensis Pierre ex Pit.; Alstonia cuneata Wall. ex G.Don

Species of tree

Alstonia spatulata is a species of tree in the family Apocynaceae. It is commonly known as hard milkwood or Siamese balsa, and Deum Chias (ដើមជាស), Deum Satba (ដើមស័ត្បា), or Deum Chamrong Preah Ream (ដើមចំរុងព្រះរាម) in Cambodian. It is native to Indochina (Cambodia, Myanmar, Thailand, and Vietnam), western Malesia (Peninsular Malaysia, Singapore, Borneo, Sumatra, and Java), and New Guinea.

The species was described by Carl Ludwig Blume in 1826.
