= Alstonia iwahigensis =

Scientific classification
- Kingdom: Plantae
- Clade: Tracheophytes
- Clade: Angiosperms
- Clade: Eudicots
- Clade: Asterids
- Order: Gentianales
- Family: Apocynaceae
- Genus: Alstonia
- Species: A. iwahigensis

Binomial name
- Alstonia iwahigensis Elmer

Species of tree

Alstonia iwahigensis is a tree in the dogbane family Apocynaceae.

== Description ==
Alstonia iwahigensis grows as a medium to large-sized tree up to 45 metres (150 ft) tall, with a trunk diameter of up to 100 centimetres (40 in). The bark is greyish, yellowish or dark brown. Its fragrant flowers feature a yellow or pinkish corolla.

== Distribution and habitat ==
Alstonia iwahigensis is native to Borneo and Palawan. The species is found in forests and on hillsides from sea level to 500 metres (1,600 ft) altitude.
