= Alstonia beatricis =

Conservation status
- Vulnerable (IUCN 2.3)

Scientific classification
- Kingdom: Plantae
- Clade: Tracheophytes
- Clade: Angiosperms
- Clade: Eudicots
- Clade: Asterids
- Order: Gentianales
- Family: Apocynaceae
- Genus: Alstonia
- Species: A. beatricis

Binomial name
- Alstonia beatricis Sidiyasa

Species of flowering plant

Alstonia beatricis is a species of plant in the family Apocynaceae. It is endemic to West Papua (Indonesia).
