= Alstonia pneumatophora =

Conservation status
- Least Concern (IUCN 3.1)

Scientific classification
- Kingdom: Plantae
- Clade: Tracheophytes
- Clade: Angiosperms
- Clade: Eudicots
- Clade: Asterids
- Order: Gentianales
- Family: Apocynaceae
- Genus: Alstonia
- Species: A. pneumatophora

Binomial name
- Alstonia pneumatophora Backer ex Den Berger

Synonyms
- Alstonia pneumatophora var. petiolata Monach.

Species of flowering plant

Alstonia pneumatophora is a species of flowering plant in the family Apocynaceae. It is a tree native to Borneo, Peninsular Malaysia, Sulawesi, and Sumatra in Indonesia and Malaysia.
