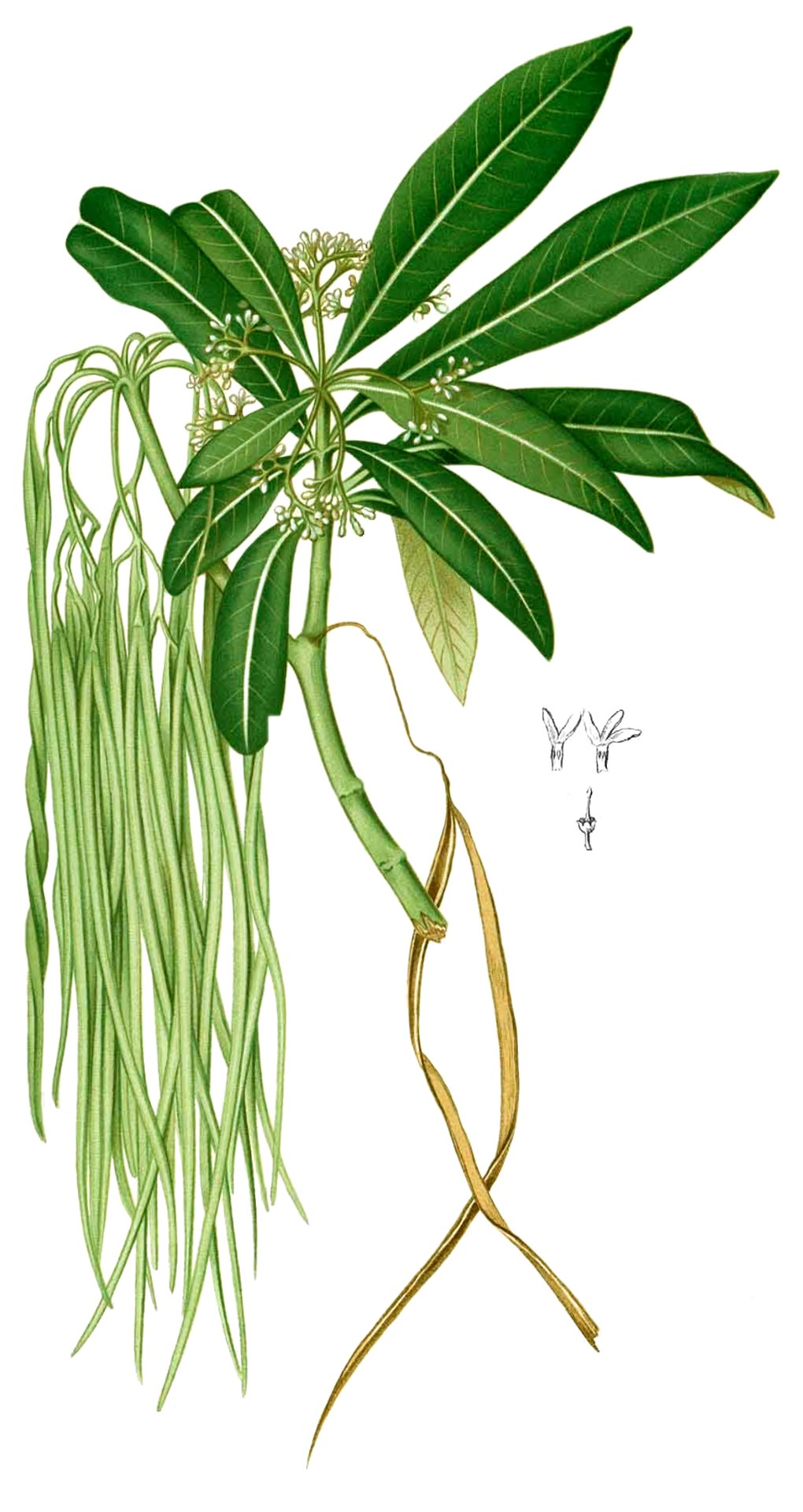

Scientific classification
- Kingdom: Plantae
- Clade: Tracheophytes
- Clade: Angiosperms
- Clade: Eudicots
- Clade: Asterids
- Order: Gentianales
- Family: Apocynaceae
- Genus: Alstonia
- Species: A. spectabilis

Binomial name
- Alstonia spectabilis R.Br.

Synonyms
- Alstonia linearis Benth.; Alstonia longissima F.Muell.; Alstonia ophioxyloides F.Muell.; Alstonia somersetensis F.M.Bailey; Alstonia spectabilis subsp. ophioxyloides (F.Muell.) P.I.Forst.; Alstonia villosa Blume; Alstonia villosa f. calvescens Markgr.; Alstonia villosa var. glabra Koord. & Valeton; Blaberopus villosa var. petiolata Miq.; Blaberopus villosus (Blume) Miq.

= Alstonia spectabilis =

Species of tree

Alstonia spectabilis, commonly known as bitterbark, yellowjacket, milky yellowwood, leatherjacket, jackapple, hard milkwood or hard cheesewood, is a medium-sized species of tree in the dogbane family. It is native to eastern Malesia, Melanesia and northern Australia.

== Description ==
The species grows as a tree to 20 m in height. The white flowers are 3.5–5 mm in diameter. The leaves are up to 36 cm long and 12.5 cm wide. The fruits are 20–40 cm long.

== Distribution and habitat ==
The species is distributed from the Philippines, Java, the Moluccas and Lesser Sunda Islands, through New Guinea, the Bismarck Archipelago and the Solomon Islands, to northern Australia, in tropical forest habitats. It is commonly found on lateritic loam and sandstone soils.

=== Subspecies ===
- Alstonia spectabilis subsp. spectabilis, Malesia to Melanesia and north Queensland
- Alstonia spectabilis subsp. ophioxyloides, Western Australia and Northern Territory
