= Hopea cordata =

Conservation status
- Critically Endangered (IUCN 3.1)

Scientific classification
- Kingdom: Plantae
- Clade: Tracheophytes
- Clade: Angiosperms
- Clade: Eudicots
- Clade: Rosids
- Order: Malvales
- Family: Dipterocarpaceae
- Genus: Hopea
- Species: H. cordata

Binomial name
- Hopea cordata J.E.Vidal

Species of tree

Hopea cordata is a species of flowering plant in the family Dipterocarpaceae. It is a tree endemic to Vietnam.

It is a small tree which grows up to 10 meters tall, and coppices after it has been cut. It is known only from a small area of southern coastal Vietnam around Cam Ranh in Khánh Hòa province, where it grows in lowland tropical dry forest. There are fewer than 250 individuals, and the species is threatened by declining area, extent, and quality of habitat. The IUCN Red List assesses the species as Critically Endangered.

The species was first described by Jules Eugène Vidal in 1962.
