= Picrinine =

Names
- IUPAC name methyl (14E)-14-ethylidene-18-oxa-2,12-diazahexacyclo[9.6.1.1^{9,15}.0^{1,9}.0^{3,8}.0^{12,17}]nonadeca-3,5,7-triene-19-carboxylate

Identifiers
CAS Number	4684-32-6
3D model (JSmol)	Interactive image
ChemSpider	24534089
PubChem CID	5320580
UNII	5N79P8889U
CompTox Dashboard (EPA)	DTXSID30425161
- InChI: InChI=1S/C20H22N2O3/c1-3-11-10-22-15-8-12(11)17(18(23)24-2)19-9-16(22)25-20(15,19)21-14-7-5-4-6-13(14)19/h3-7,12,15-17,21H,8-10H2,1-2H3/b11-3- Key: BDXYPHKGNUGUFG-JYOAFUTRSA-N
- SMILES: C/C=C\1/CN2C3CC1C(C45C3(NC6=CC=CC=C64)OC2C5)C(=O)OC

Properties
Chemical formula	C_{20}H_{22}N_{2}O_{3}
Molar mass	338.40 g/mol
- Except where otherwise noted, data are given for materials in their standard state (at 25 °C [77 °F], 100 kPa). Infobox references

Picrinine is a bio-active alkaloid from Alstonia boonei, a medicinal tree of West Africa.
