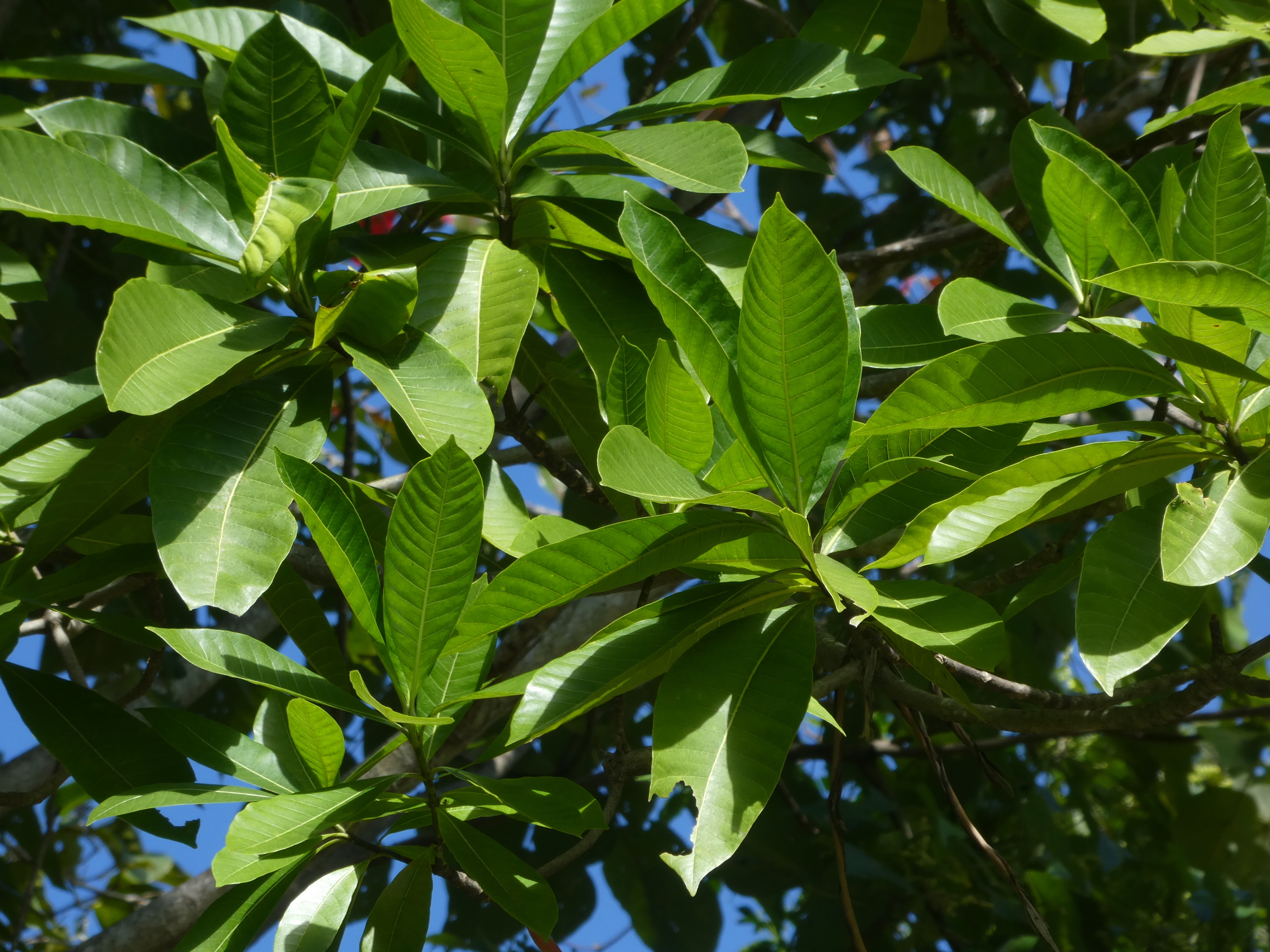
- Foliage

Conservation status
- Least Concern (NCA)
- Least Concern (IUCN 3.1)

Scientific classification
- Kingdom: Plantae
- Clade: Tracheophytes
- Clade: Angiosperms
- Clade: Eudicots
- Clade: Asterids
- Order: Gentianales
- Family: Apocynaceae
- Genus: Alstonia
- Species: A. muelleriana

Binomial name
- Alstonia muelleriana Domin
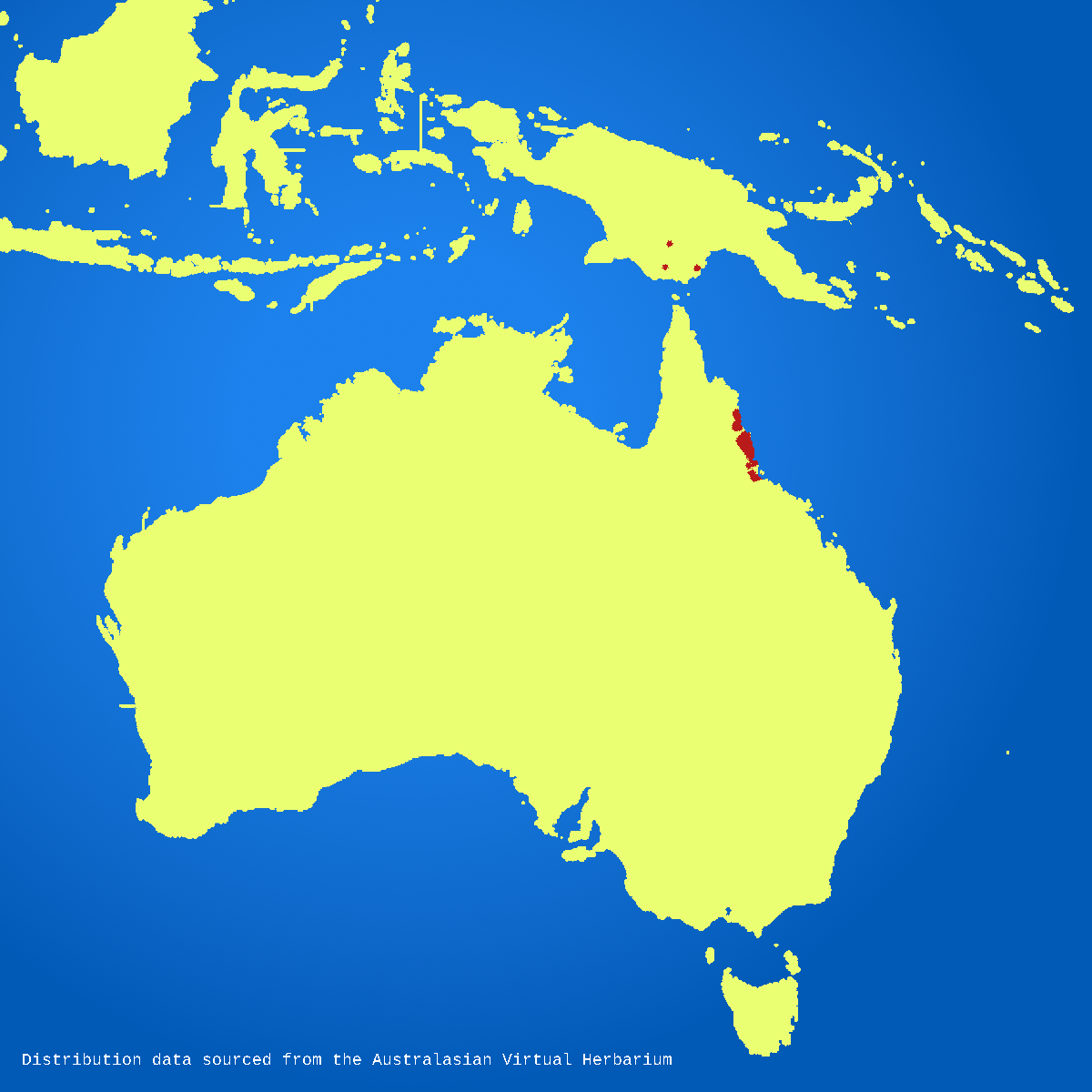

Synonyms
- Alstonia villosa Benth.; Alstonia muelleriana var. parvifolia Domin

= Alstonia muelleriana =

Hard milkwood

Species of flowering plant

Alstonia muelleriana is a tree in the dogbane family Apocynaceae which is native to southern Papua New Guinea and northeastern Queensland.

== Description ==
Alstonia muelleriana is an evergreen tree growing to between 15 and 25 m (49 and 82 ft) in height. The leaves are simple and produced in whorls of three or four. They measure up to 19 by 7 cm (7.5 by 2.8 in) and are attached to the twigs by a petiole about 8 mm (0.3 in) long. They are softly hairy on both sides (less so on the top) and have up to 18 lateral veins either side of the midrib.

The inflorescences are terminal or axillary panicles up to 10 cm (3.9 in) long. The small flowers are about 5 mm (0.2 in) diameter and are 5-merous, with five green sepals and five white/cream petals.

The fruit is a green dehiscent follicle, measuring around 40 cm (16 in) or more in length and 6–9 mm (0.2–0.4 in) diameter. At maturity they turn brown and split longitudinally, releasing numerous small, hairy seeds that are dispersed by the wind.

== Taxonomy ==
This species was first described in 1928 by the Czech botanist Karel Domin, who published his description in the book Bibliotheca Botanica.

=== Etymology ===
The genus name Alstonia was raised by the Scottish botanist Robert Brown in 1811, in honour of his countryman Charles Alston. The species epithet muelleriana is in honour of the German-born Australian botanist Ferdinand von Mueller.

== Distribution and habitat ==
The range of the hard milkwood is restricted to a small part of northeastern Queensland, from near Rossville to the Paluma Range N.P. north of Townsville, and also the southwestern parts of Papua New Guinea.

It grows in rainforests, but is also found in drier forests and is common in regrowth or disturbed areas.

== Conservation ==
This species is listed by both the Queensland Department of Environment and Science and the IUCN as least concern. The IUCN states in its assessment that the population is stable and that no current or future threats have been identified.

== Gallery ==
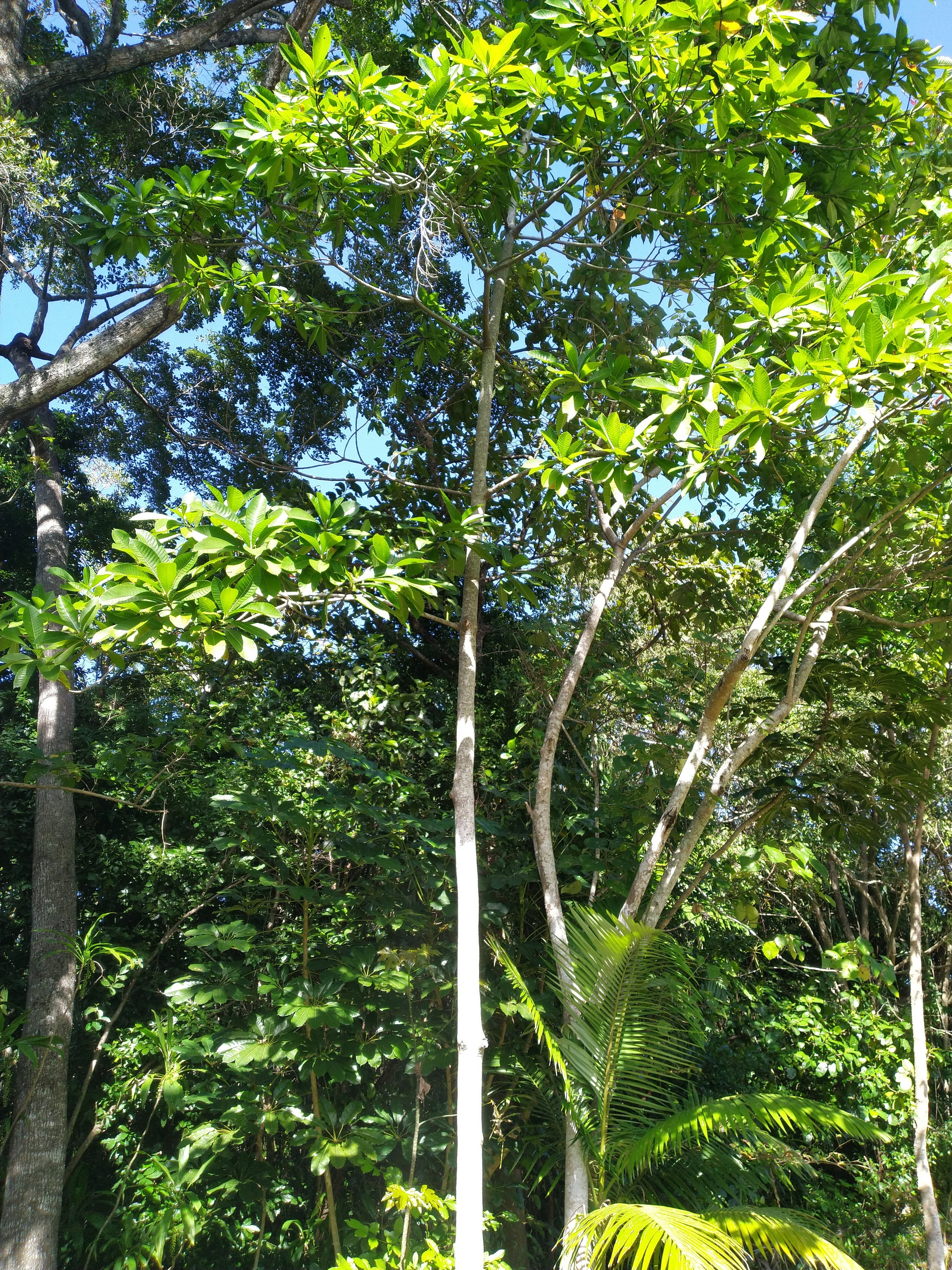
Small tree

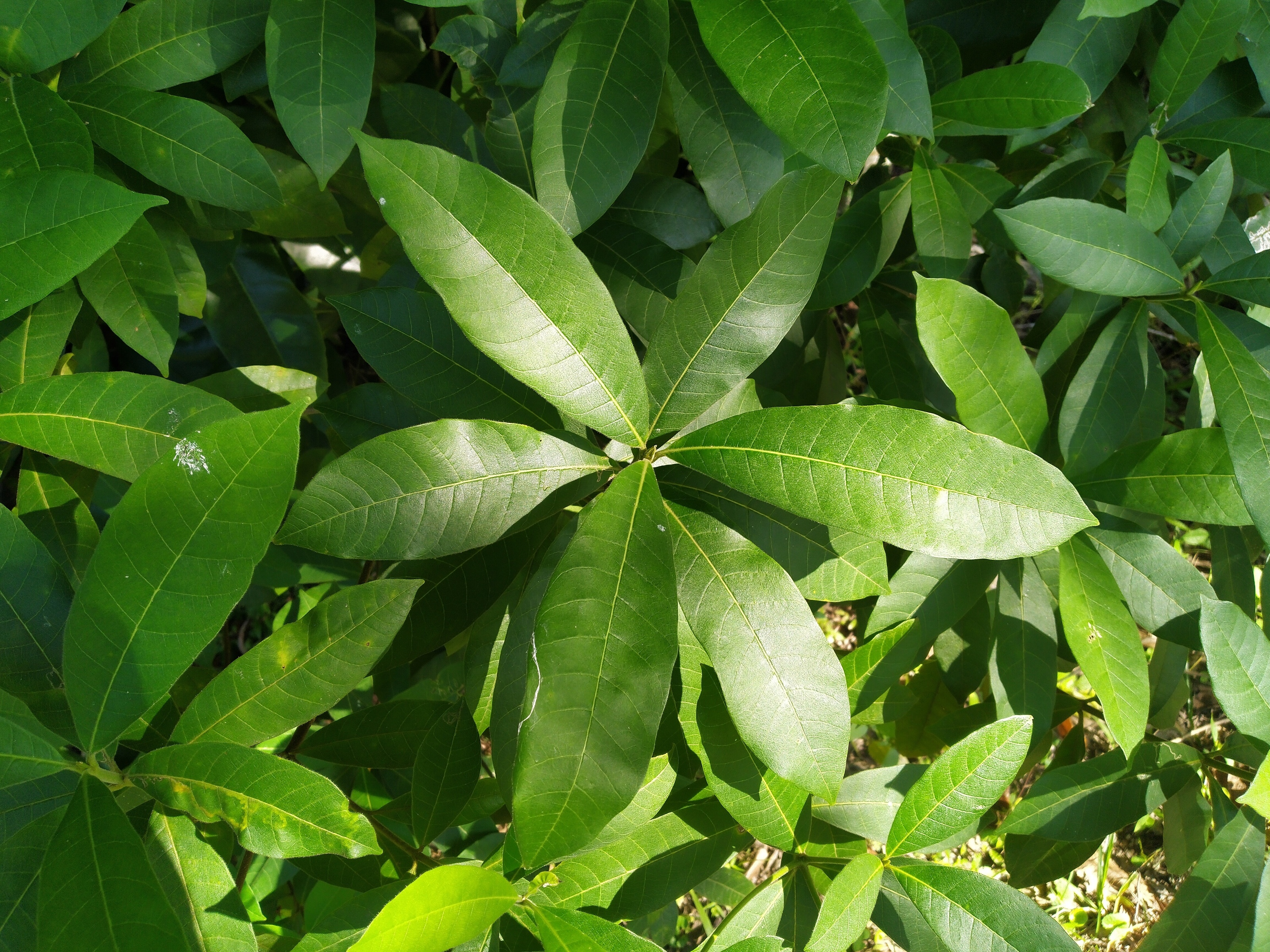
Foliage

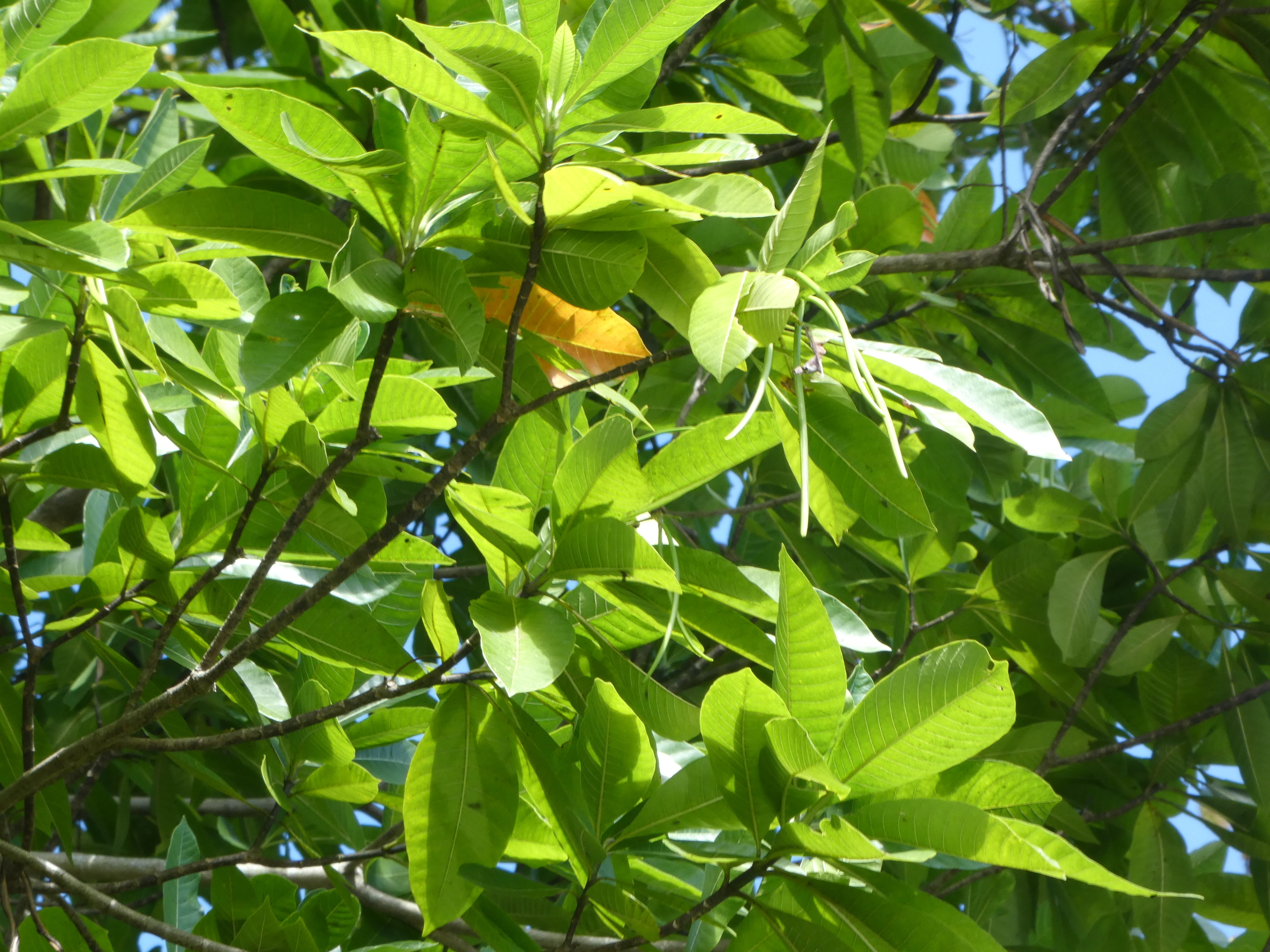
Foliage and unripe fruit
