= Alstonia venenata =

Scientific classification
- Kingdom: Plantae
- Clade: Tracheophytes
- Clade: Angiosperms
- Clade: Eudicots
- Clade: Asterids
- Order: Gentianales
- Family: Apocynaceae
- Genus: Alstonia
- Species: A. venenata

Binomial name
- Alstonia venenata R.Br.

Species of flowering plant

Alstonia venenata is a plant of the family Apocynaceae. It grows as a shrub or small tree in low to mid elevation deciduous forests of India. The bark of the plant and, sometimes, the fruit, are used for medicinal purposes.

== Alkaloids ==
Venenatine [1055-75-0]

Stigmasterol, reserpine, and two new indole alkaloids, venenatine and isovenenatine, were isolated from the bark.

A pair of alkaloids were discovered in the fruits of this plant called echitovenidine and (+)-minovincinine:

Echitoserpidine is another alkaloid discovered in the fruits of this plant.
