= Alstonia sebusii =

Scientific classification
- Kingdom: Plantae
- Clade: Tracheophytes
- Clade: Angiosperms
- Clade: Eudicots
- Clade: Asterids
- Order: Gentianales
- Family: Apocynaceae
- Genus: Alstonia
- Species: A. sebusii

Binomial name
- Alstonia sebusii (Van Heurck & Müll.Arg.) Monach.

Synonyms
- Alstonia henryi Tsiang; Alstonia sebusii var. szemaoensis Monach.; Blaberopus sebusii Van Heurck & Müll.Arg.

Species of plant

Alstonia sebusii, synonym Alstonia henryi, is a species of flowering plant in the family Apocynaceae, native to the region of Assam, south-central China, the east Himalayas and Myanmar. It was first described in 1871 as Blaberopus sebusii.

== Conservation ==
Alstonia henryi was assessed as "vulnerable" in the 2004 IUCN Red List, where it is said to be native only to Yunnan, China. As of February 2023, A. henryi was regarded as a synonym of Alstonia sebusii, which has a wider distribution.
