= Alstonia rupestris =

Conservation status
- Critically Endangered (IUCN 3.1)

Scientific classification
- Kingdom: Plantae
- Clade: Tracheophytes
- Clade: Angiosperms
- Clade: Eudicots
- Clade: Asterids
- Order: Gentianales
- Family: Apocynaceae
- Genus: Alstonia
- Species: A. rupestris

Binomial name
- Alstonia rupestris Kerr

Synonyms
- Blaberopus rupester (Kerr) Pichon

Species of flowering plant

Alstonia rupestris is a species of flowering plant in the family Apocynaceae. It is a shrub native to western Guangxi in southern China and to northern Thailand. It grows up to about four metres tall. It is native to open subalpine scrub on limestone rocks from 1,900 to 2,200 metres elevation. The Thai population is threatened by frequent fires. The IUCN Red List assesses the species as Critically Endangered.
