= Alstonia actinophylla =

Scientific classification
- Kingdom: Plantae
- Clade: Tracheophytes
- Clade: Angiosperms
- Clade: Eudicots
- Clade: Asterids
- Order: Gentianales
- Family: Apocynaceae
- Genus: Alstonia
- Species: A. actinophylla

Binomial name
- Alstonia actinophylla (A.Cunn.) K.Schum.

Synonyms
- Alyxia actinophylla A.Cunn.; Alstonia verticillosa F.Muell.

Species of tree

Alstonia actinophylla, commonly known as northern milkwood, cape milkwood, cape cheesewood or white cheesewood, is a medium-sized species of tree in the dogbane family. It is native to northern Australia and New Guinea.

== Description ==
The species grows as a tree to 3–25 m in height. The greenish-white 1 cm flowers occur in bunches at the ends of the branches, with flowering occurring mainly from August to October. The shiny green leaves occur in clusters on the outer branches; they are 5–10 cm long and 2–4 cm wide. The stringy 15 cm long fruits are paired pods containing hairy black seeds.

== Distribution and habitat ==
As well as in southern New Guinea, the species is found across tropical northern Australia in dry woodland habitats, rocky country, on the banks of watercourses and on the fringes of rainforest.
