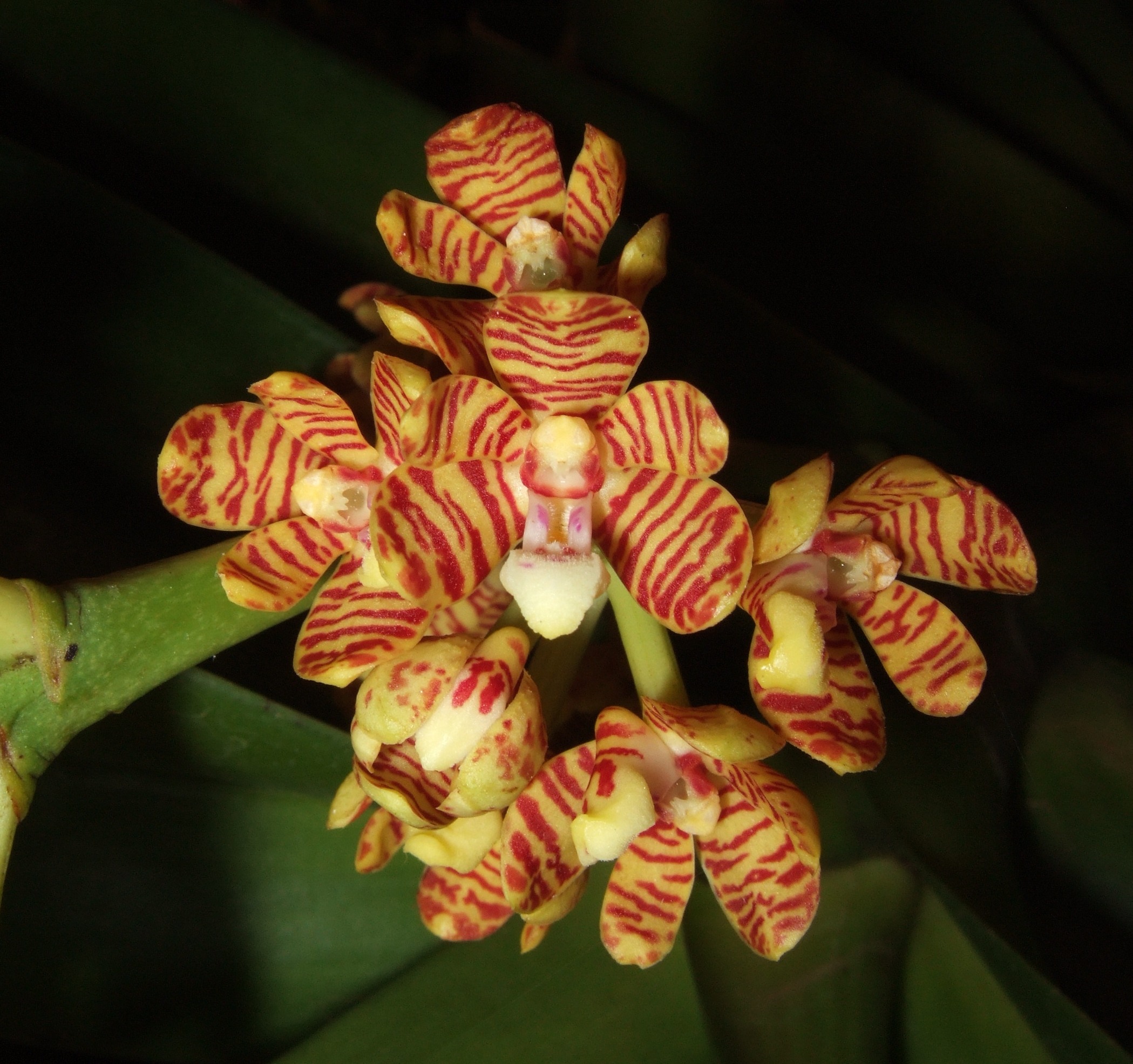
- Acampe rigida

Scientific classification
- Kingdom: Plantae
- Clade: Tracheophytes
- Clade: Angiosperms
- Clade: Monocots
- Order: Asparagales
- Family: Orchidaceae
- Subfamily: Epidendroideae
- Tribe: Vandeae
- Subtribe: Aeridinae
- Genus: Acampe; Lindl.

Type species
- Acampe multiflora (syn of A. rigida) (Lindl.) Lindl.

Synonyms
- Sarcanthus Lindl.

= Acampe =

Genus of epiphytes

Acampe, abbreviated as Acp in horticultural trade, is a genus of monopodial, epiphytic vandaceous species of orchids, distributed from tropical Asia from India, eastwards to China and southwards to Malaysia, and the Philippines as well as from tropical Africa, Madagascar and islands of the Indian Ocean. The name Acampe was derived from the Greek word akampas, meaning "rigid", referring to the small, brittle, inflexible flowers.

Acampe produce slow-growing, medium-sized vines that form very large vegetative masses in nature. They are noted for their thick, leathery, distichous leaves. They produce fragrant small to medium-sized yellow flowers, barred with orange or red stripes, in a few to many-flowered racemose inflorescence. The brittle sepals and petals look alike. The ear-shaped, fringed, white labellum (lip) is saccate (sac-shaped) or has a spur, and has red markings at its base. The fleshy column is short and has two waxy pollinia.

Due to their large size and small flowers, they are rarely cultivated.

== Species ==
Eight species are recognized as of May 2014:

1. Acampe carinata (Griff.) Panigrahi - China, India, Assam, Bangladesh, Nepal, Cambodia, Laos, Myanmar, Thailand, Vietnam
2. Acampe cephalotes Lindl. - Assam, Bangladesh
3. Acampe hulae Telepova - Laos, Cambodia
4. Acampe joiceyana (J.J.Sm.) Seidenf. - Myanmar, Thailand, Vietnam
5. Acampe ochracea (Lindl.) Hochr. - Yunnan, Assam, Bangladesh, India, Sri Lanka, Cambodia, Laos, Myanmar, Malaysia, Thailand, Vietnam
6. Acampe pachyglossa Rchb.f. - Africa from Somalia to South Africa; Madagascar, Comoros, Mauritius, Seychelles, Réunion, Aldabra
7. Acampe praemorsa (Roxb.) Blatt. & McCann - India, Sri Lanka, Myanmar
8. Acampe rigida (Buch.-Ham. ex Sm.) P.F.Hunt - China, India, Assam, Bangladesh, Nepal, Sri Lanka, Andaman Islands, Cambodia, Laos, Myanmar, Thailand, Vietnam, Malaya, Philippines

Acampe forms a few intergeneric hybrids :

- × Aracampe (Acampe × Arachnis)
- × Vancampe (Acampe × Vanda)
