= Echitamidine =

Names
- Other names Methyl (19S)-19-hydroxy-2,16-didehydrocuran-17-oate

Identifiers
CAS Number	38681-90-2
3D model (JSmol)	Interactive image
ChemSpider	9166637
PubChem CID	190982
UNII	8V48NUF3JX
- InChI: InChI=1S/C20H24N2O3/c1-11(23)13-10-22-8-7-20-14-5-3-4-6-15(14)21-18(20)17(19(24)25-2)12(13)9-16(20)22/h3-6,11-13,16,21,23H,7-10H2,1-2H3/t11-,12-,13-,16-,20?/m0/s1 Key: DWLJVOJBWLYMJO-CZGIKHJPSA-N
- SMILES: C[C@@H]([C@@H]1CN2CCC34[C@@H]2C[C@@H]1C(=C3NC5=CC=CC=C45)C(=O)OC)O

Properties
Chemical formula	C_{20}H_{24}N_{2}O_{3}
Molar mass	340.423 g·mol^{−1}
- Except where otherwise noted, data are given for materials in their standard state (at 25 °C [77 °F], 100 kPa). Infobox references

Echitamidine is an indole alkaloid isolated from Alstonia boonei. Its laboratory synthesis has been reported.
