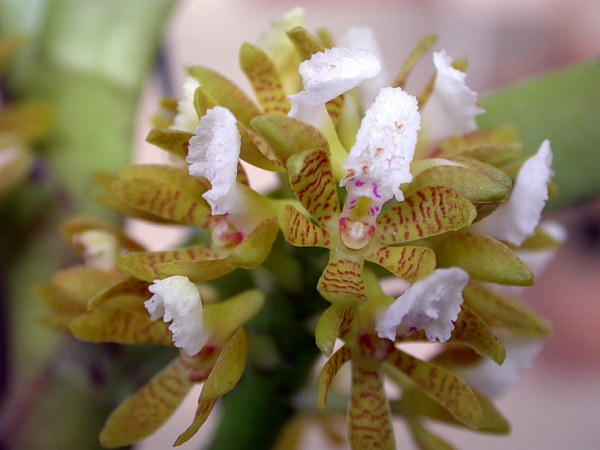

Scientific classification
- Kingdom: Plantae
- Clade: Tracheophytes
- Clade: Angiosperms
- Clade: Monocots
- Order: Asparagales
- Family: Orchidaceae
- Subfamily: Epidendroideae
- Genus: Acampe
- Species: A. praemorsa

Binomial name
- Acampe praemorsa (Roxb.) Blatt. & McCann (1932)

Synonyms
- Cymbidium praemorsum (Roxb.) Sw. (1799); Sarcanthus praemorsus (Roxb.) Lindl. ex Spreng. (1826); Sarcochilus praemorsus (Roxb.) Spreng. (1826); Saccolabium papillosum Lindl. (1833); Rhynchostylis papillosa Heynh. (1847); Vanda wightiana Lindl. ex Wight (1851); Acampe excavata Lindl. (1853); Acampe wightiana (Lindl. ex Wight) Lindl. (1853); Acampe papillosa Lindl. (1853); Vanda fasciata Gardner ex Lindl. (1853); Saccolabium papillosum Dalzell & Gibson (1861); Saccolabium praemorsum (Roxb.) Hook.f. (1890); Saccolabium wightianum (Lindl. ex Wight) Hook.f. (1890); Gastrochilus papillosus Kuntze (1891)

= Acampe praemorsa =

Species of orchid

Acampe praemorsa is a species of monopodial orchid. It distributed in India, Sri Lanka, Thailand and Burma.
