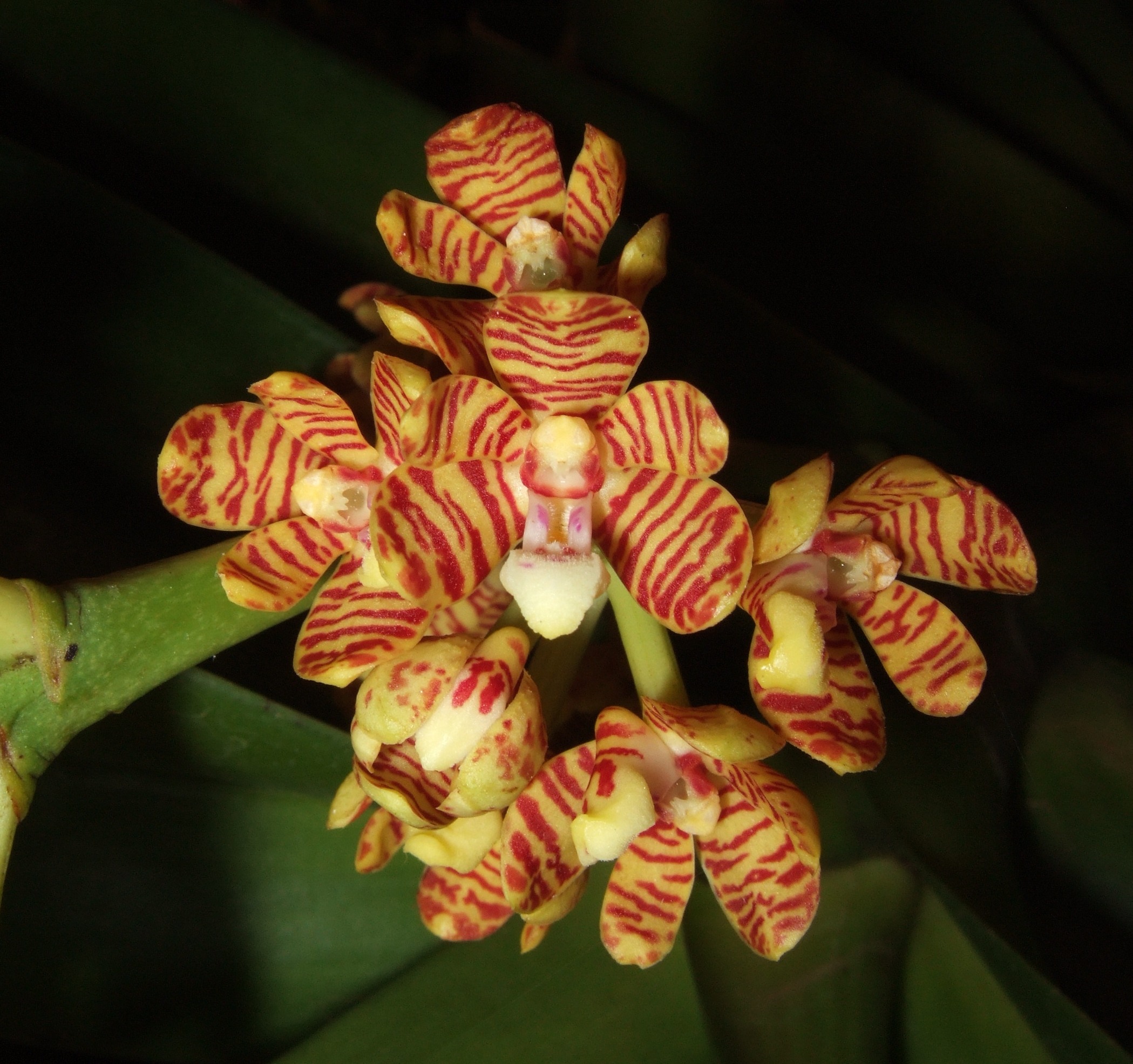
- Flowers

Scientific classification
- Kingdom: Plantae
- Clade: Tracheophytes
- Clade: Angiosperms
- Clade: Monocots
- Order: Asparagales
- Family: Orchidaceae
- Subfamily: Epidendroideae
- Genus: Acampe
- Species: A. rigida

Binomial name
- Acampe rigida (Buch.- Ham. ex Sm.) P.F. Hunt (1970)

Synonyms
- List: Aerides rigidum Buch.-Ham. ex Sm. (1818) (Basionym); Vanda multiflora Lindl. (1826); Vanda longifolia Lindl. 1833; Acampe longifolia (Lindl.) Lindl. (1853); Acampe multiflora (Lindl.) Lindl. (1853); Acampe intermedia Rchb.f. (1856); Acampe wightiana var. longipedunculata Trimen (1885); Saccolabium longifolium (Lindl.) Hook.f. (1890); Gastrochilus longifolius (Lindl.) Kuntze (1891); Acampe penangiana Ridl. (1896); Vanda viminea Guillaumin (1930); Acampe taiwaniana S.S. Ying (1974)

= Acampe rigida =

Species of orchid native to Asia

Acampe rigida is a species of orchid native to the forests of tropical southern Asia where it grows on trees and rocks at altitudes of up to 1,800 m (6,000 ft).

== Description ==
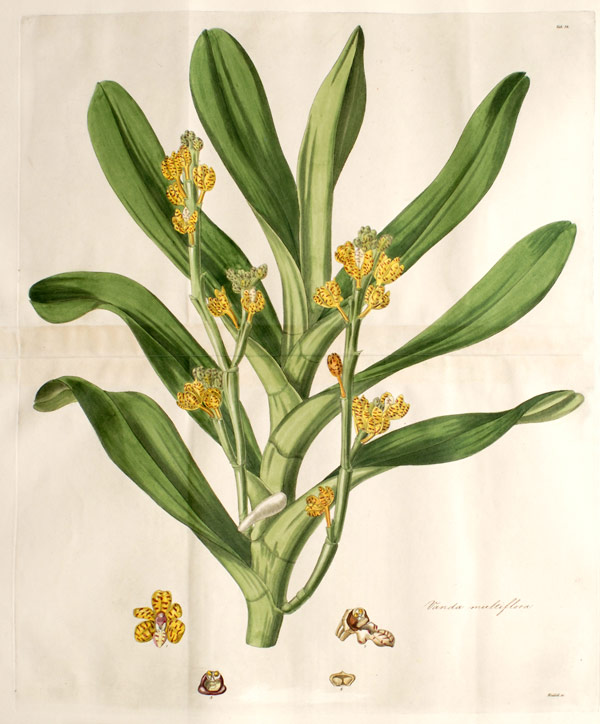
Illustration of Acampe rigida as Vanda multiflora from Lindley, John: Collectanea Botanica (1821)

Acampe rigida is a robust species with an unbranched stem up to 1 m (40 in) in length and 20 mm (0.8 in) in diameter. The leaves are distichous. The stem nodes are about 25 mm (1 in) apart and each bears a somewhat fleshy, upright leaf with sheathing base. The apices of the leaves are obtuse and unequally bilobed. The inflorescence is unbranched or sparsely branched, with many slightly fragrant, upturned, cup-shaped flowers less than 25 mm (1 in) in diameter. The petals are fleshy, and are yellow with purplish-brown stripes; they have a thick, white, three-lobed lower lip, and a short spur. They are followed by cylindrical or fusiform capsules.

== Distribution and habitat ==
Acampe rigida is native to the Andaman Islands, Assam, Bangladesh, Bhutan, Cambodia, China, India, Laos, Malaysia, Myanmar, Nepal, the Philippines, Sri Lanka, Thailand and Vietnam. It occurs in forests, either growing epiphytically on the branches and trunks of trees, or growing on rocks, and often forming dense clumps. Its altitudinal range is from 300 to 1,800 m (1,000 to 6,000 ft).

== Ecology ==
Acampe rigida is a deceptive orchid in that it produces a fragrance that may attract insects but does not then offer them any reward. It is self-compatible, but has not evolved any particular mechanism to enable self-pollination. In Guangxi province in southwestern China, it flowers in late August and September, at a time of year when rain falls almost daily and insect pollinators are scarce. In a research study, after many hours of observation, a single insect was observed to visit a flower, but pollination did not occur. Instead, the plant exhibited ombrophily; rain drops falling on the tips of the stamens knocked the caps off the anthers, and further drops caused the pollinia to be ejected upwards, after which strap-like stipes arrested their movement and caused them to land in the stigma cavity, resulting in self-pollination. A high rate of fruit set occurred, but without the action of the raindrops, self-pollination did not occur and fruit did not set.
