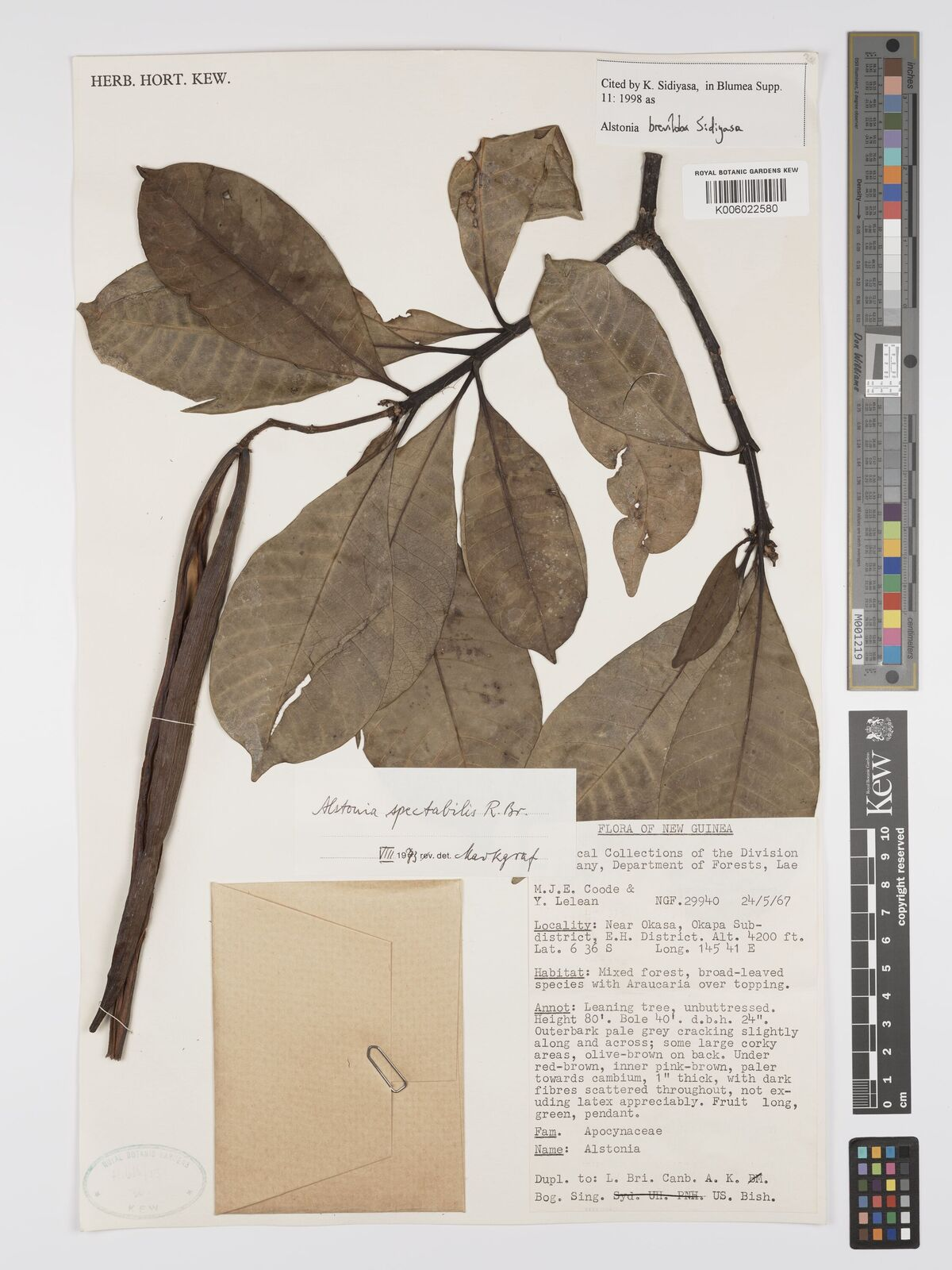

Conservation status
- Endangered (IUCN 3.1)

Scientific classification
- Kingdom: Plantae
- Clade: Tracheophytes
- Clade: Angiosperms
- Clade: Eudicots
- Clade: Asterids
- Order: Gentianales
- Family: Apocynaceae
- Genus: Alstonia
- Species: A. breviloba

Binomial name
- Alstonia breviloba Sidiyasa

= Alstonia breviloba =

Species of tree

Alstonia breviloba is a species of flowering plant in the family Apocynaceae. It is a tree endemic to eastern New Guinea in Papua New Guinea.
