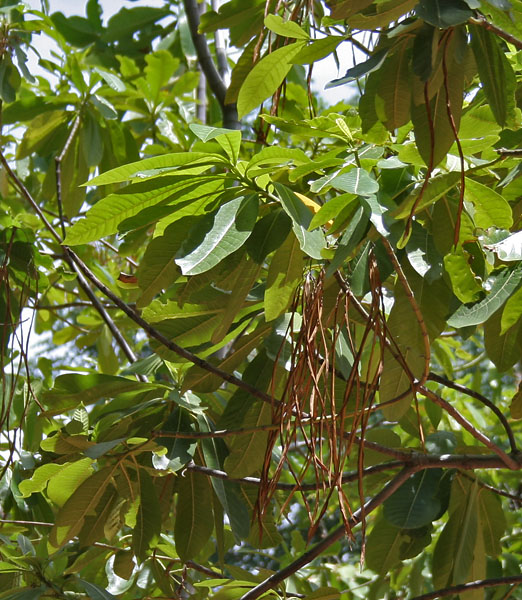
- leaves & fruit in Hyderabad, India.

Conservation status
- Least Concern (IUCN 3.1)

Scientific classification
- Kingdom: Plantae
- Clade: Tracheophytes
- Clade: Angiosperms
- Clade: Eudicots
- Clade: Asterids
- Order: Gentianales
- Family: Apocynaceae
- Genus: Alstonia
- Species: A. macrophylla

Binomial name
- Alstonia macrophylla Wall.

Synonyms
- Alstonia acuminata Miq.; Alstonia batino Blanco.; Alstonia brassii Monach.; Alstonia costata Wall. ex Miq.; Alstonia glabriflora Markgr.; Alstonia oblongifolia Merr.; Alstonia pangkorensis King & Gamble; Alstonia paucinervia Merr.; Alstonia subsessilis Miq.

= Alstonia macrophylla =

Species of flowering plant

Alstonia macrophylla, the hard alstonia, hard milkwood or big-leaved macrophyllum, is a species of plant in the family Apocynaceae.

== Distribution ==
It is native to Indonesia (Kalimantan and Sulawesi), Malaysia, the Philippines (Tagalog: batino), Thailand, and Vietnam. It was introduced to Sri Lanka, where it is known as hawari nuga by local Sinhalese people.

== Description ==
Alstonia macrophylla is a tree with a straight trunk and a high, narrow crown. It can grow up to 30 meters tall. The trunk and branches contain a white latex. The bark is smooth and has a light grey color. Leaves are in whorls of three to four, simple, penni-veined, membranous, and glabrous above. Leaf-blades are 10 to 50 centimeters long, 5 to 15 cm wide, widest in or above the middle, and cuneate at the base. Flowers are about 7 mm in diameter, white, with narrow corolla tube, placed terminal on twigs. Fruits are about 30 centimeters long, green and filled with many small hairy seeds that are dispersed far and wide by the wind. The heartwood is yellowish, with a straight and shallowly interlocked grain with a moderately fine to rather coarse texture.

== Natural habitat ==
Grows in a wide range of habits. Undisturbed and disturbed areas from sea-level up to 2900 meters elevation. Grows near the coast behind mangrove forests and in mixed dipterocarp forests. Usually grows on ridges and hillsides with sandy to clayey soils. It also grows in ultrabasic and limestone soils.

== Uses ==
The timber is of superior quality to that of Alstonia scholaris and less liable to attack by boring insects. It is used for making roof beams, frames, poles and toys. Being a quick growing tree that grows in a wide range of habitats and soils, it has been used for reforestation in Sri Lanka.

== Invasive species ==
In Sri Lanka, where it is called "havari nuga", it has been used for reforestation due to its fast growth rate and is now a widely spread invasive species in the wet zone. It mostly grows as a pioneer tree in disturbed forest areas.

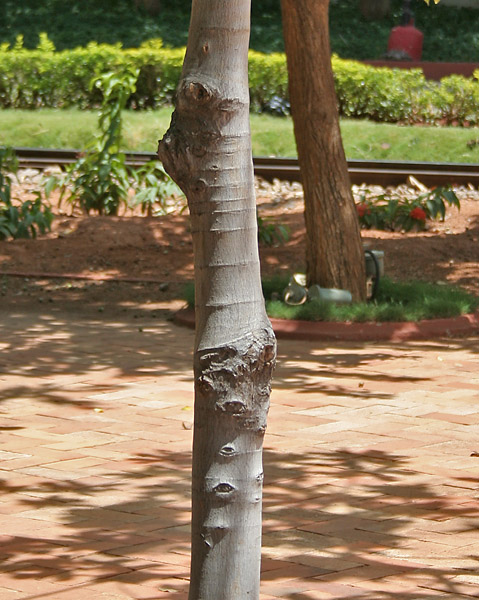
Trunk in Hyderabad, India.

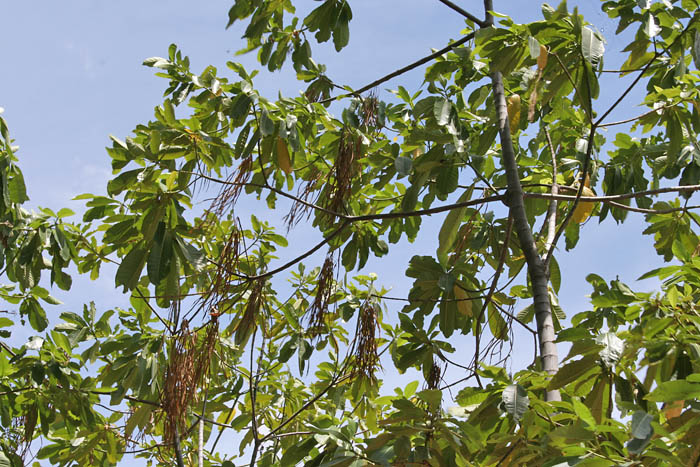
Tree with fruits in Hyderabad, India.

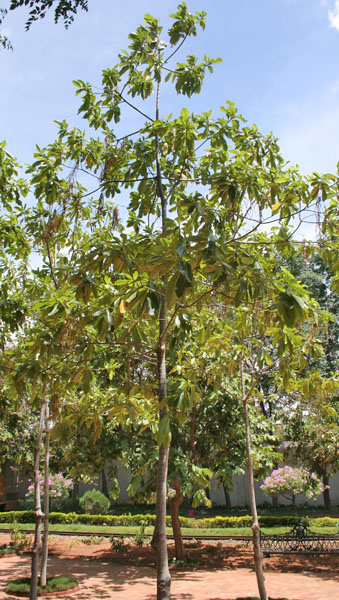
Tree in Hyderabad, India.

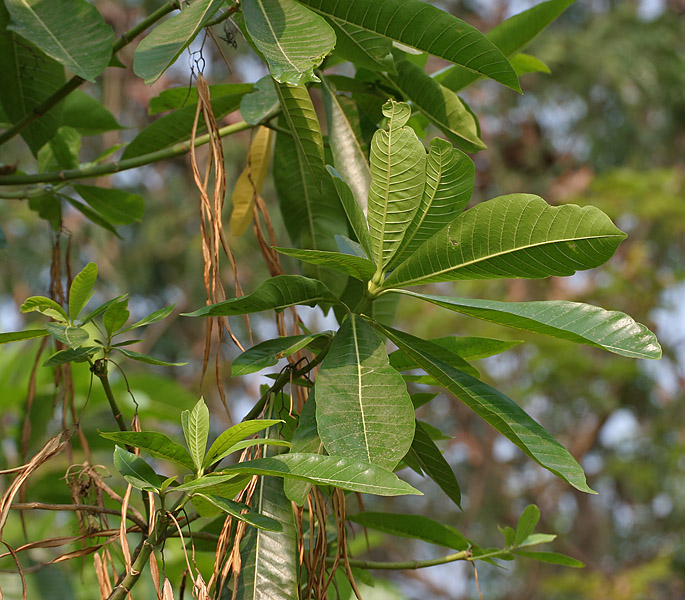
Leaves in Hyderabad, India.

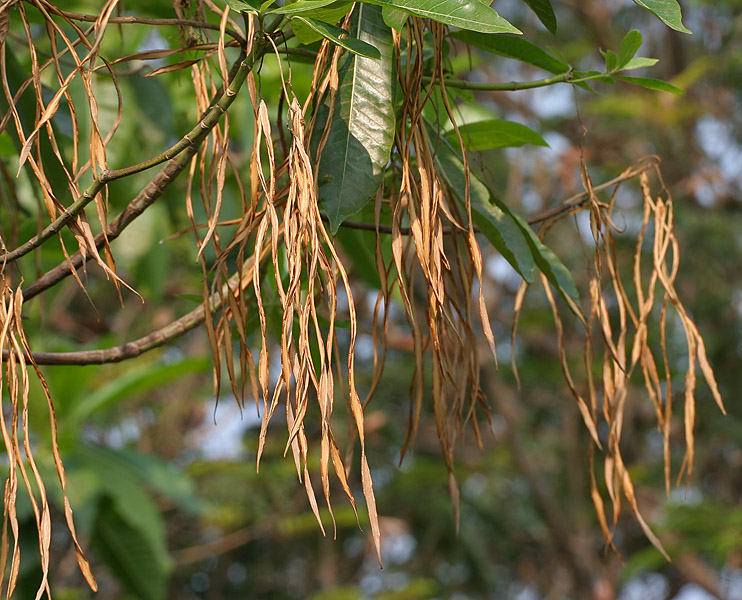
Fruit in Hyderabad, India.

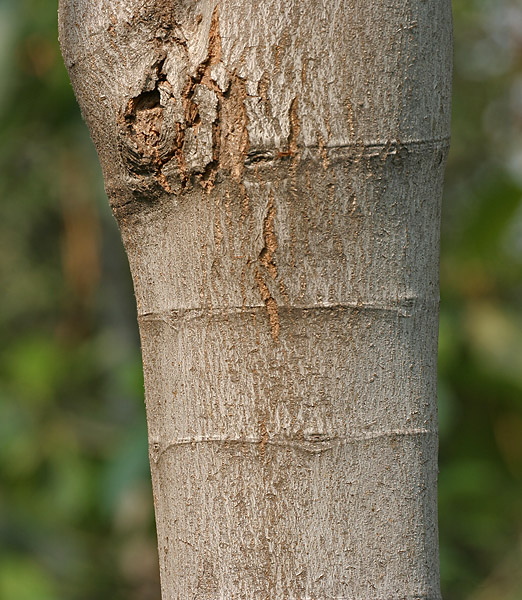
Trunk in Hyderabad, India.

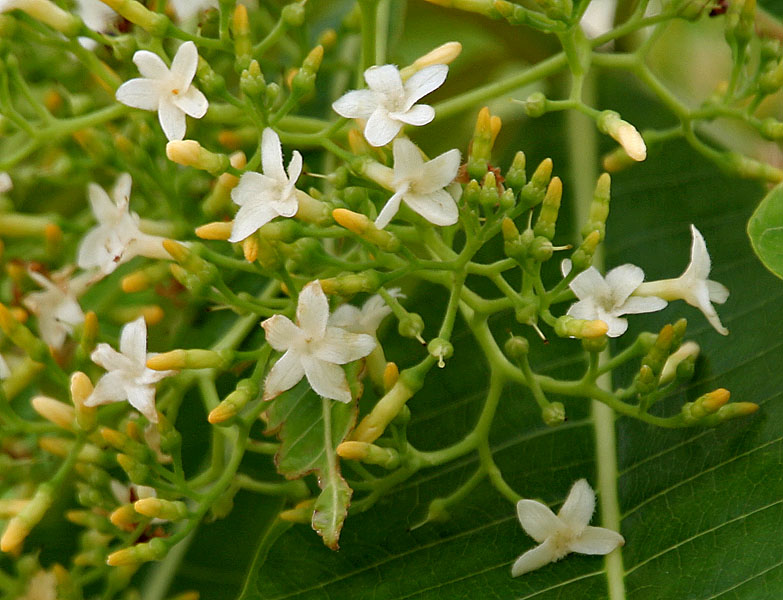
Flowers in Hyderabad, India.

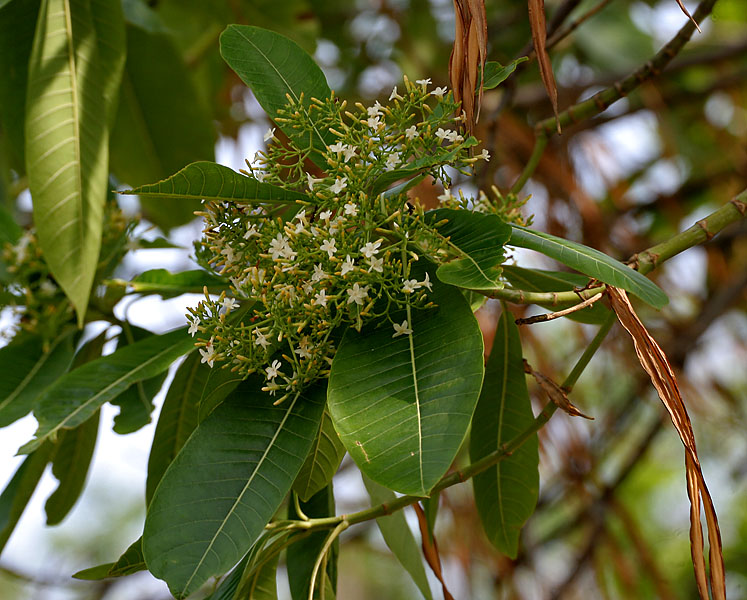
Flowers in Hyderabad, India.

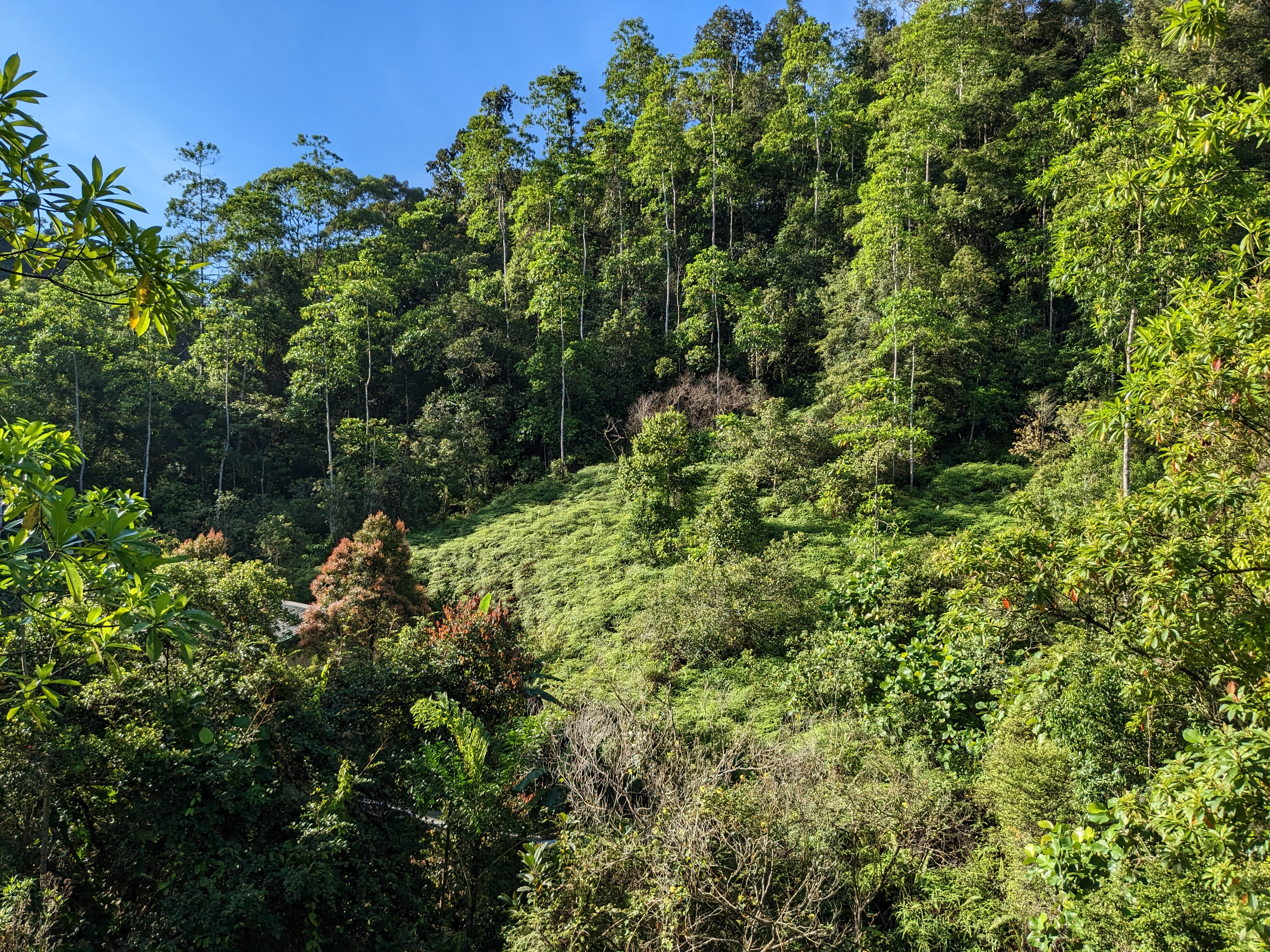
Alstonia macrophylla take over abandoned landscapes like these in Sri Lanka's wet zone - photo from Sinharaja rainforest, Sri Lanka
