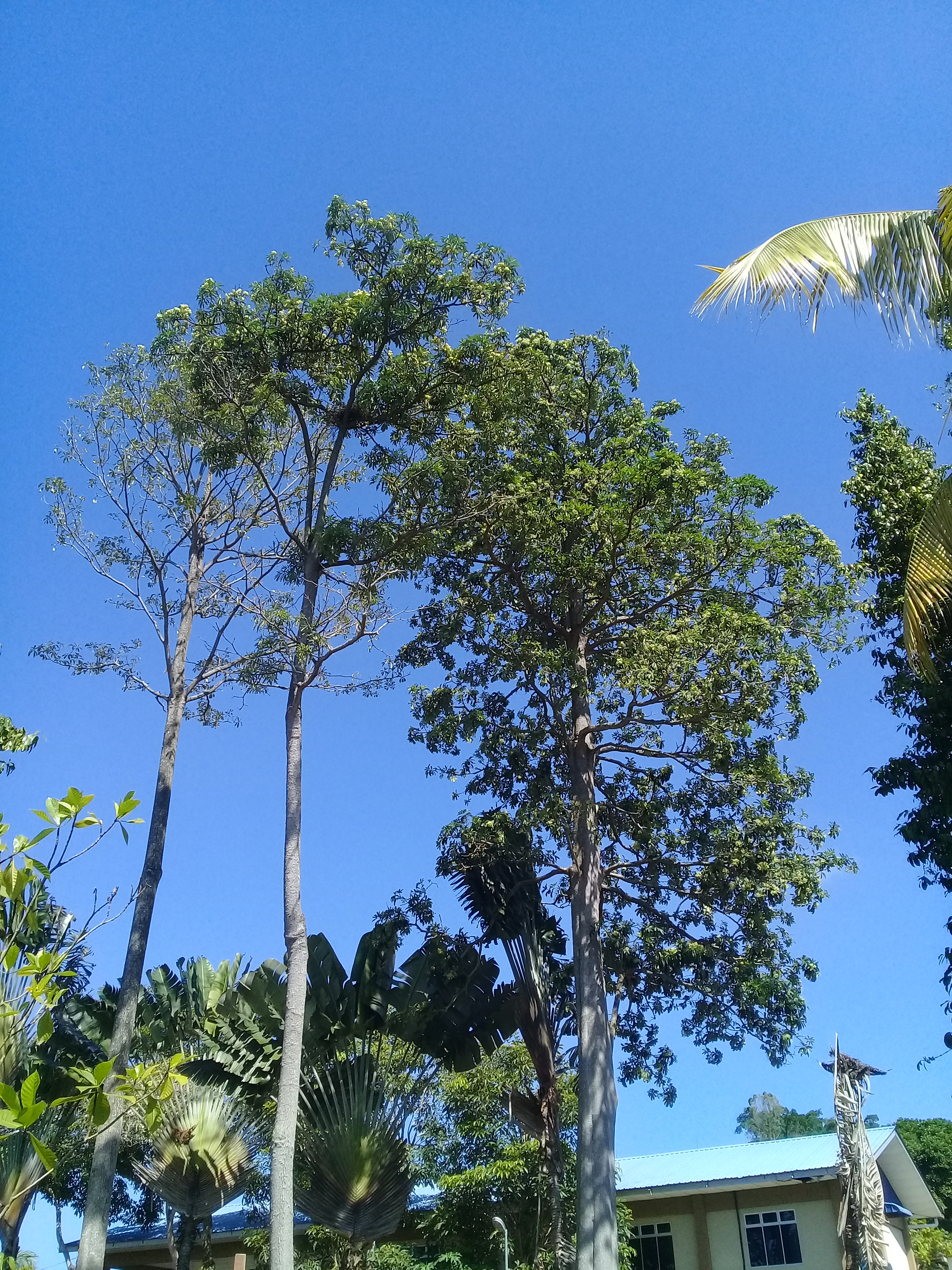

Conservation status
- Least Concern (IUCN 3.1)

Scientific classification
- Kingdom: Plantae
- Clade: Tracheophytes
- Clade: Angiosperms
- Clade: Eudicots
- Clade: Asterids
- Order: Gentianales
- Family: Apocynaceae
- Genus: Alstonia
- Species: A. angustifolia

Binomial name
- Alstonia angustifolia Wall. ex A.DC.

Synonyms
- Alstonia angustifolia var. elliptica King & Gamble; Alstonia angustifolia var. latifolia King & Gamble; Alstonia beccarii (Benth.) Pichon; Alstonia latifolia (King & Gamble) Ridl.; Amblyocalyx beccarii Benth.

= Alstonia angustifolia =

Species of flowering plant

Alstonia angustifolia is a species of flowering plant in the family Apocynaceae. It is a tree native to Borneo, Peninsular Malaysia, and Sumatra in Brunei, Indonesia, and Malaysia. It can be used to relieve headache.
