= Alstonia penangiana =

Conservation status
- Vulnerable (IUCN 2.3)

Scientific classification
- Kingdom: Plantae
- Clade: Tracheophytes
- Clade: Angiosperms
- Clade: Eudicots
- Clade: Asterids
- Order: Gentianales
- Family: Apocynaceae
- Genus: Alstonia
- Species: A. penangiana

Binomial name
- Alstonia penangiana Sidiyasa

Species of tree

Alstonia penangiana is a species of plant in the family Apocynaceae. It is a tree endemic to Peninsular Malaysia.
