= Southern Vietnam lowland dry forests =

Ecoregion (WWF)

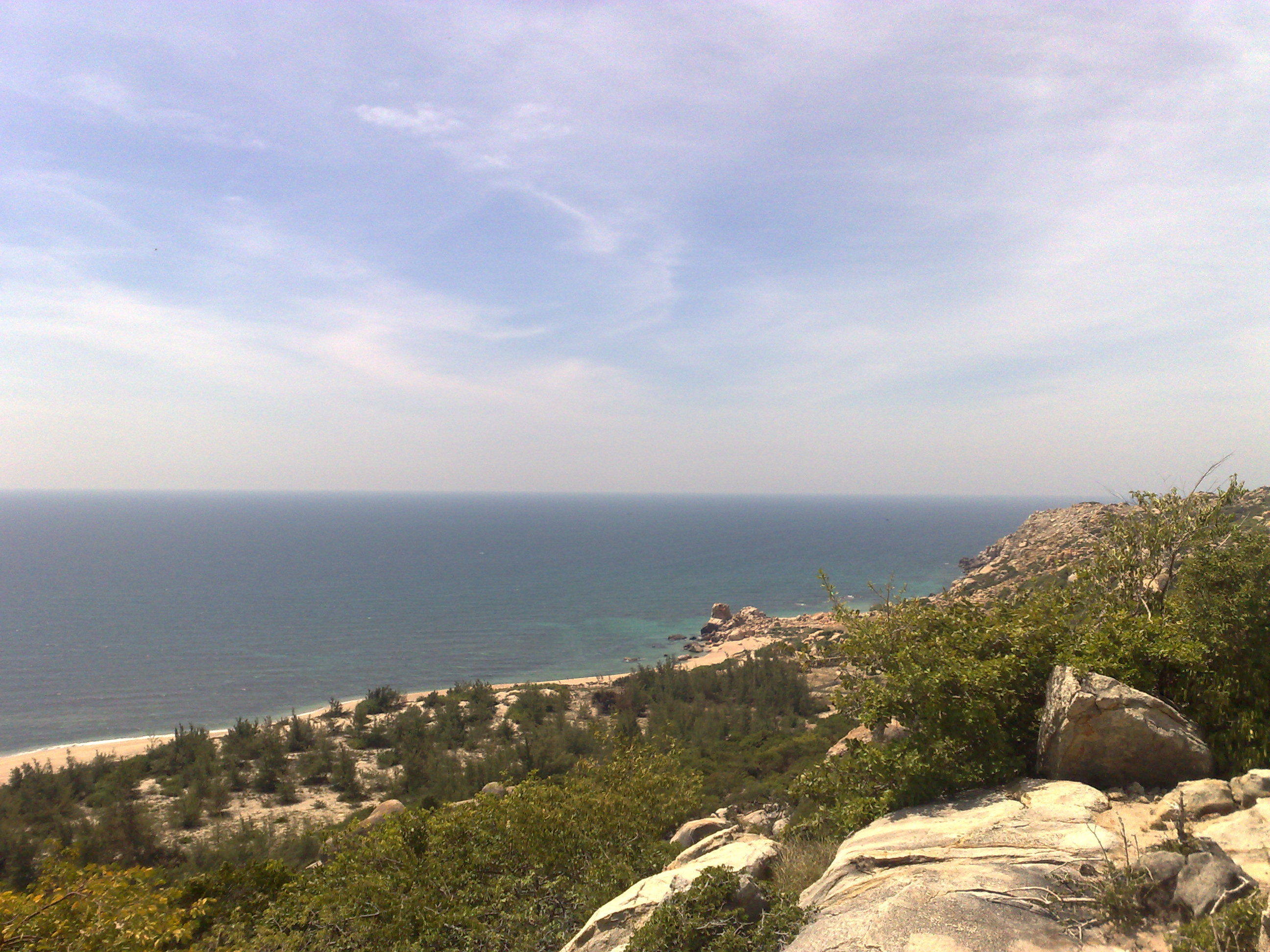
- Turtle Nesting Beach, Nui Chua National Park

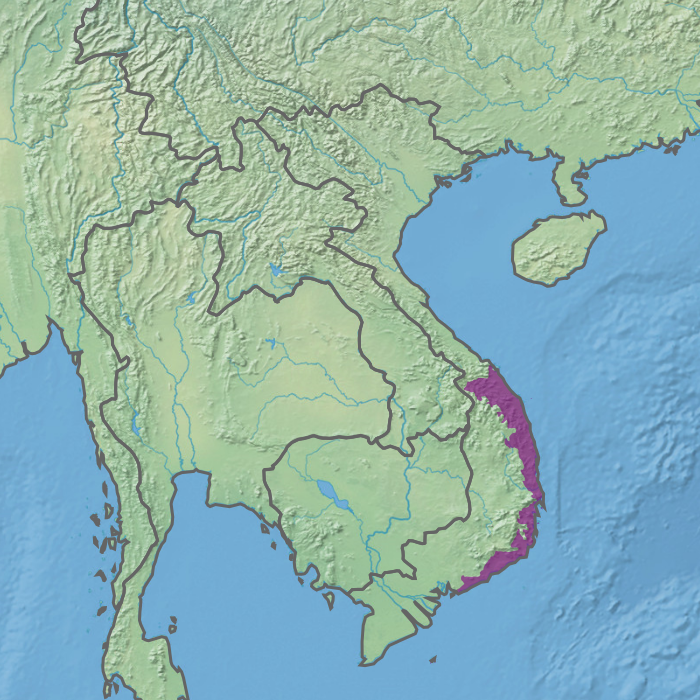
- Ecoregion territory (in purple)

Ecology
- Realm: Indomalayan
- Biome: Tropical and subtropical dry broadleaf forests

Geography
- Area: 35,000 km^{2} (14,000 sq mi)
- Country: Vietnam
- Coordinates: 13.25°N 109.1°E

The Southern Vietnam lowland dry forests ecoregion (WWF ID: IM0211) covers the low, relatively arid coastal strip of southern Vietnam on the South China Sea. The region is in the rain shadow of the Southern Annamite Range, which blocks humid air from the west. Although approximately half of the ecoregion is forested to some degree, most has at some point been cleared for agriculture or degraded by extraction of hardwoods. There are few protected areas.

== Location and description ==
The coast in this ecoregion is a series of alluvial plains separated by ridges extending down from the Annamite Range on the west. The separating hills rise to 1,000 meters, and are typically granite or rhyolite. The region stretches for 750 km from Da Nang in the north to the edge of the Mekong River delta in the south, and averages about 50 km wide. Mean elevation is 200 meters.

== Climate ==
The climate of ecoregion is Tropical savanna climate - dry winter (Köppen climate classification (Aw)). This climate is characterized by relatively even temperatures throughout the year, and a pronounced dry season. The driest month has less than 60 mm of precipitation, and is drier than the average month. Annual rainfall is less than 1,500 mm in most of the region, and as low as 800 mm.

== Flora and fauna ==
Nearest the beach are extensive dunes of red sand, with woody thickets giving way to evergreen forest cover on coastal hills and higher elevations. Two endemic species of trees on these dunes are the critically endangered Hopea cordata and Shorea falcata.

Where freshwater gathers at the base of the dunes there are communities of Phreatophytes (plants that maintain constant contact with ground water) that create forest cover up to 12 meters in height. At semi-arid higher elevations of the coastal slopes are forest and thicket stands that support other endemic species but are under human pressure.
