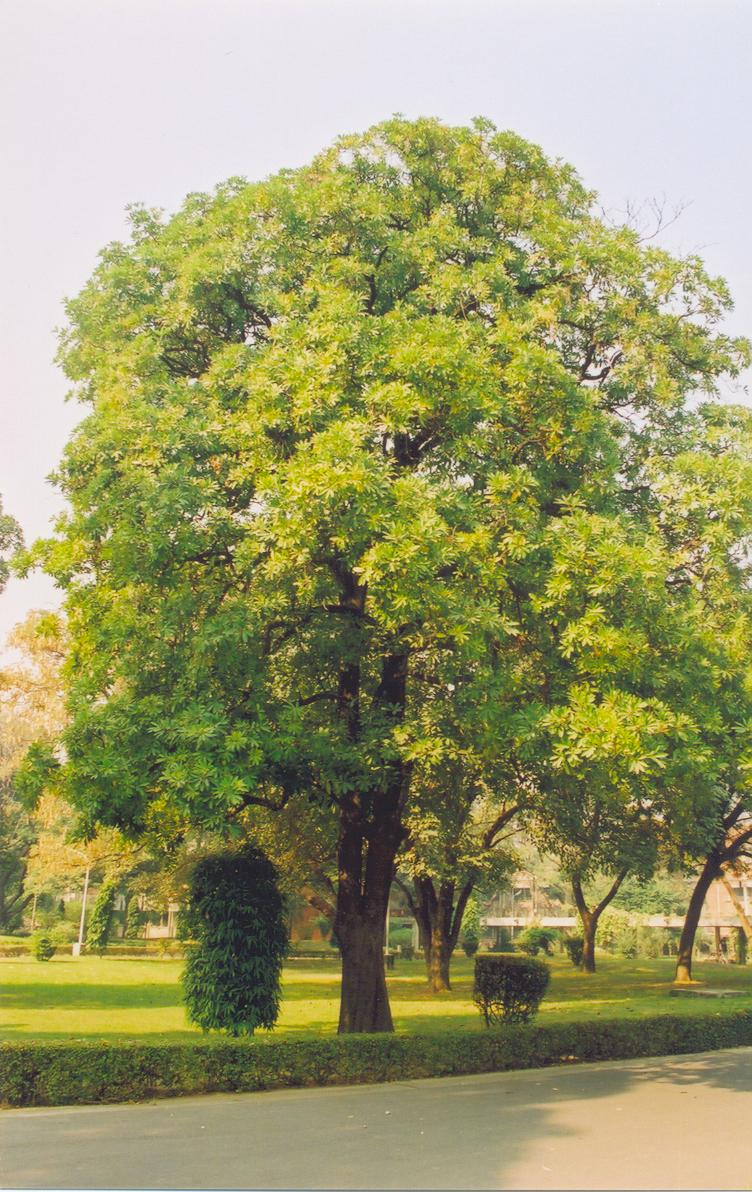
- Alstonia scholaris, habit (above), details (below)
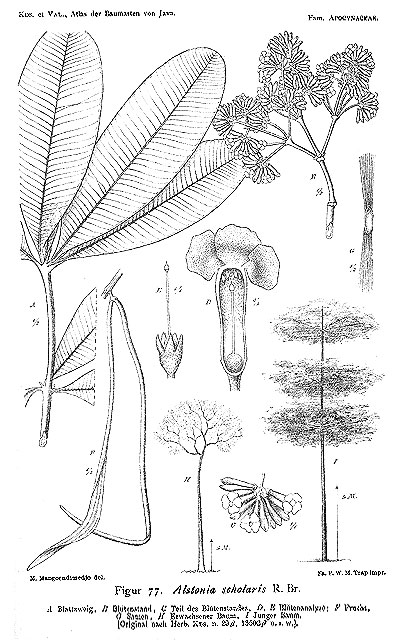

Scientific classification
- Kingdom: Plantae
- Clade: Embryophytes
- Clade: Tracheophytes
- Clade: Angiosperms
- Clade: Eudicots
- Clade: Asterids
- Order: Gentianales
- Family: Apocynaceae
- Subfamily: Rauvolfioideae
- Tribe: Alstonieae
- Genus: Alstonia; R.Br.

Type species
- Alstonia scholaris typ. cons. R.Br.

Synonyms
- Amblyocalyx Benth.; Blaberopus A.DC.; Pala Juss.; Paladelpha Pichon; Tonduzia Pittier; Winchia A.DC.

= Alstonia =

Genus of flowering plants

Alstonia is a widespread genus of evergreen trees and shrubs, of the family Apocynaceae. It was named by Robert Brown in 1811, after Charles Alston (1685–1760), professor of botany at Edinburgh from 1716 to 1760.

The type species Alstonia scholaris (L.) R.Br. was originally named Echites scholaris by Linnaeus in 1767.

== Description ==
Alstonia consists of about 40–60 species (according to different authors) native to tropical and subtropical Africa, Central America, Southeast Asia, Polynesia and Australia, with most species in the Malesian region.

These trees can grow very large, such as Alstonia pneumatophora, recorded with a height of 60 m and a diameter of more than 2 m. Alstonia longifolia is the only species growing in Central America (mainly shrubs, but also trees 20 m high).

The leathery, sessile, simple leaves are elliptical, ovate, linear or lanceolate and wedge-shaped at the base. The leaf blade is dorsiventral, medium-sized to large and disposed oppositely or in a whorl and with entire margin. The leaf venation is pinnate, with numerous veins ending in a marginal vein. Phyllotaxy is whorled i.e. two or more leaves arises at a node and form a whorl .

The inflorescence is terminal or axillary, consisting of thyrsiform cymes or compound umbels. The small, more or less fragrant flowers are white, yellow, pink or green and funnel-shaped, growing on a pedicel and subtended by bracts. They consist of 5 petals and 5 sepals, arranged in four whorls. The fertile flowers are hermaphrodite. The gamosepalous green sepals consist of ovate lobes, and are distributed in one whorl. The annular disk is hypogynous. The five gamesepalous petals have oblong or ovate lobes and are disposed in one whorl. The corolla lobes overlapping to the left (such as A. rostrata) or to the right (such as A. macrophylla) in the bud. The ovary has 2 separate follicles with glabrous or ciliate, oblong seeds that develop into deep blue podlike, schizocarp fruit, between 7–40 cm long. The plants contain a milky latex, rich in poisonous alkaloids. Fijians use the latex of A. costata (saurua, sorua) as a form of chewing gum. The Alstonia macrophylla is commonly known in Sri Lanka as 'Havari nuga' or the 'wig banyan' because of its distinct flower that looks like a woman's long wig.

Alstonia trees are used in traditional medicine.

Many Alstonia species are harvested for timber, called pule or pulai in Indonesia and Malaysia. Trees from the section Alstonia produce lightweight timber, while those from the sections Monuraspermum and Dissuraspermum produce heavy timber.

Alstonia trees are widespread and mostly not endangered. However a few species are very rare, such as A. annamensis, A. beatricis, A. breviloba, A. stenophylla and A. guangxiensis.

== Species ==
Alstonia has five distinct sections, each a monophyletic group; Alstonia, Blaberopus, Tonduzia, Monuraspermum, Dissuraspermum.

As of April 2025, Plants of the World Online accepts the following 44 species:

- Alstonia actinophylla (A.Cunn.) K.Schum. – milkwood - New Guinea, N Australia
- Alstonia angustifolia A.DC. - Borneo, W Malaysia, Sumatra
- Alstonia angustiloba Miq. - Borneo, W Malaysia, Sumatra, Thailand, Java
- Alstonia annamensis (Monach.) K.Sidiyasa - Cambodia, Vietnam
- Alstonia balansae Guillaumin - New Caledonia
- Alstonia beatricis K.Sidiyasa - Waigeo I in E Indonesia
- Alstonia boonei De Wild. - W + C + E Africa
- Alstonia boulindaensis Boiteau - New Caledonia
- Alstonia breviloba K.Sidiyasa - Papua New Guinea
- Alstonia congensis Engl. - W + C Africa
- Alstonia constricta F.Muell. – bitterbark, quinine tree, Australian fever bark - E Australia
- Alstonia coriacea Pancher & S.Moore - New Caledonia
- Alstonia costata R.Br. - S Pacific
- Alstonia curtisii King & Gamble - Thailand
- Alstonia deplanchei Van Heurck & Müll.Arg. - New Caledonia
- Alstonia guangxiensis D.Fang & X.X.Chen - Guangxi in China
- Alstonia iwahigensis Elmer - Borneo, Palawan
- Alstonia lanceolata Van Heurck & Müll.Arg. - New Caledonia
- Alstonia lanceolifera S.Moore - New Caledonia
- Alstonia legouixiae Van Heurck & Müll.Arg. - New Caledonia
- Alstonia lenormandii Van Heurck & Müll.Arg. - New Caledonia
- Alstonia longifolia (A.DC.) Pichon - Mexico, Central America
- Alstonia macrophylla Wall. ex G.Don – batino, devil tree - S China, Sri Lanka, SE Asia, New Guinea
- Alstonia mairei H. Léveillé - S China, N Vietnam
- Alstonia muelleriana Domin – jackapple, leatherjacket, milky yellowwood - New Guinea, Queensland
- Alstonia neriifolia D.Don - Nepal, Sikkim, Bhutan
- Alstonia odontophora Boiteau - New Caledonia
- Alstonia parkinsonii (M.Gangop. & Chakrab.) Lakra & Chakrab. - Andaman Is.
- Alstonia parvifolia Merr. - Philippines
- Alstonia penangiana K.Sidiyasa - Penang Hill in Malaysia
- Alstonia pneumatophora Backer ex L.G.Den Berger - W Malaysia, Borneo, Sulawesi, Sumatra
- Alstonia quaternata Van Heurck & Müll.Arg. - New Caledonia
- Alstonia rostrata C.E.C.Fischer - Yunnan, Indochina, W Malaysia, Sumatra
- Alstonia rubiginosa K.Sidiyasa - Papua New Guinea
- Alstonia rupestris Kerr - Thailand
- Alstonia scholaris (L.) R.Br. – pali-mari, dita bark, bitter bark, milkwood, milky bean, milky pine, white cheesewood, scholar tree, blackboard tree - E + S + SE Asia, Papuasia, N Australia
- Alstonia sebusii (Van Heurck & Müll.Arg.) Monach. - Yunnan, Bhutan, Assam, N Myanmar
- Alstonia spatulata Blume – hard milkwood, Siamese balsa - SE Asia, New Guinea
- Alstonia spectabilis R.Br. – poele bark, jackapple, leatherjacket, milky yellowwood - SE Asia, Papuasia, N Australia
- Alstonia sphaerocapitata Boiteau - New Caledonia
- Alstonia venenata R.Br. - S India
- Alstonia vieillardii Van Heurck & Müll.Arg. - New Caledonia
- Alstonia vietnamensis D.J.Middleton - Vietnam
- Alstonia yunnanensis Diels - Yunnan, Guizhou, Guangxi

== Gallery ==
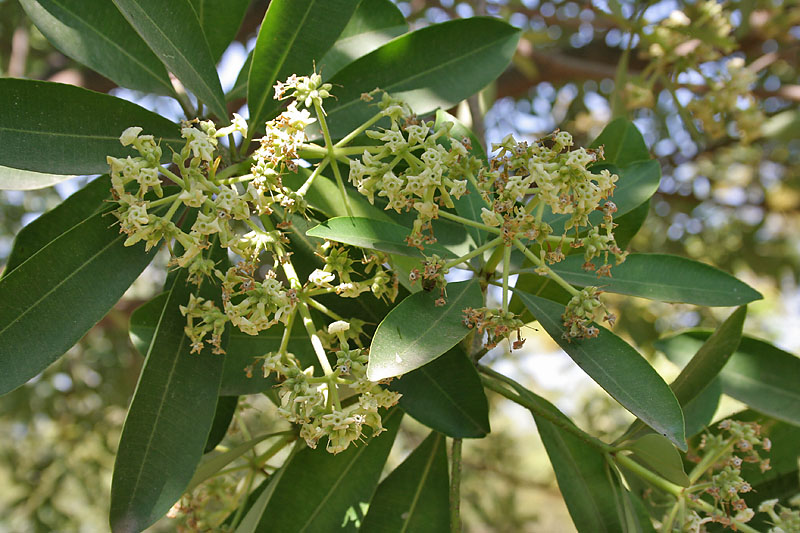
Alstonia scholaris

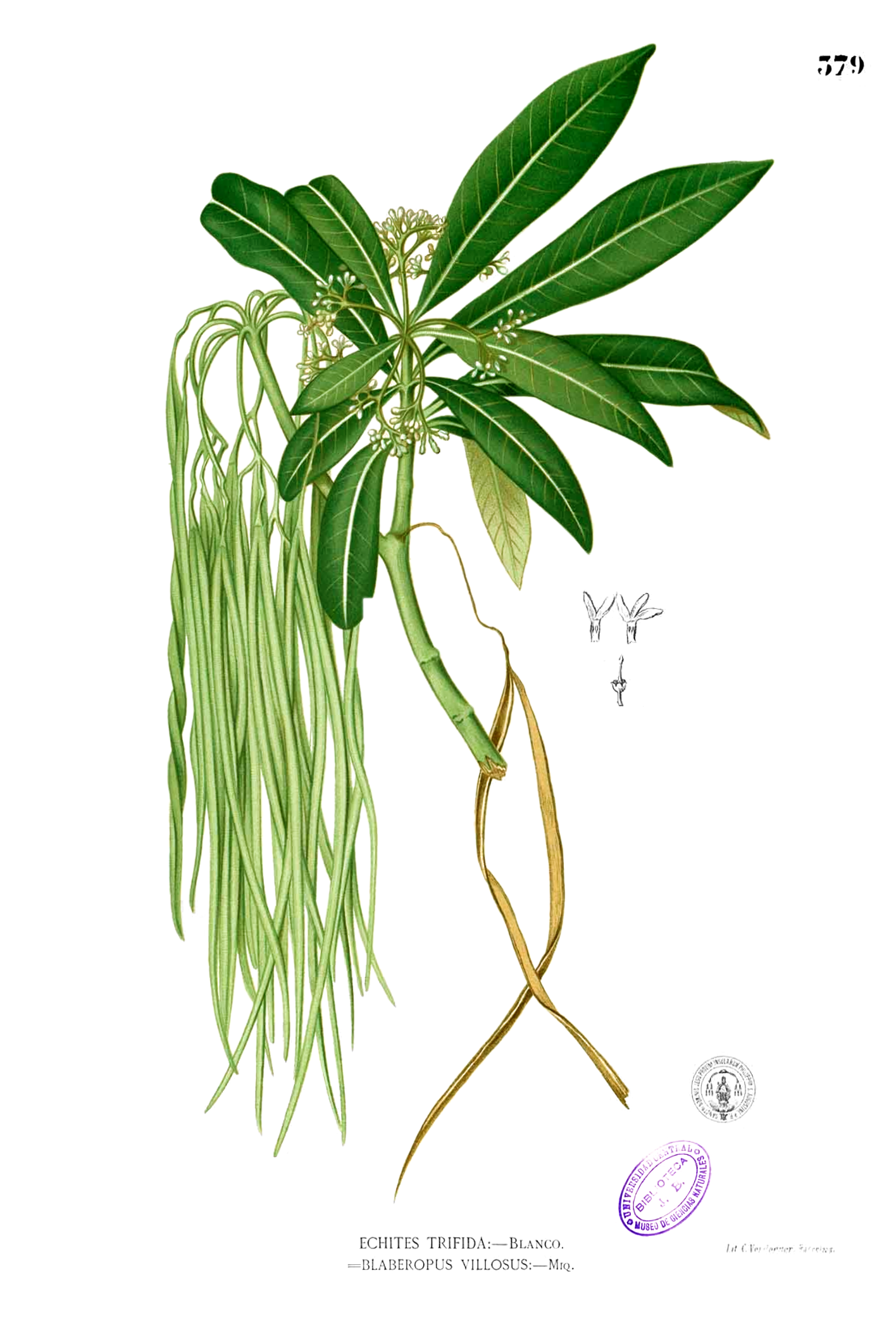
Alstonia spectabilis

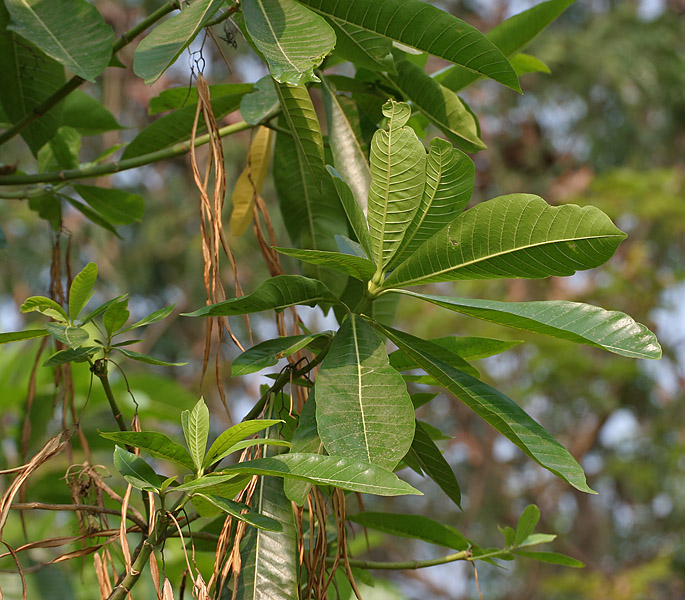
Alstonia macrophylla
