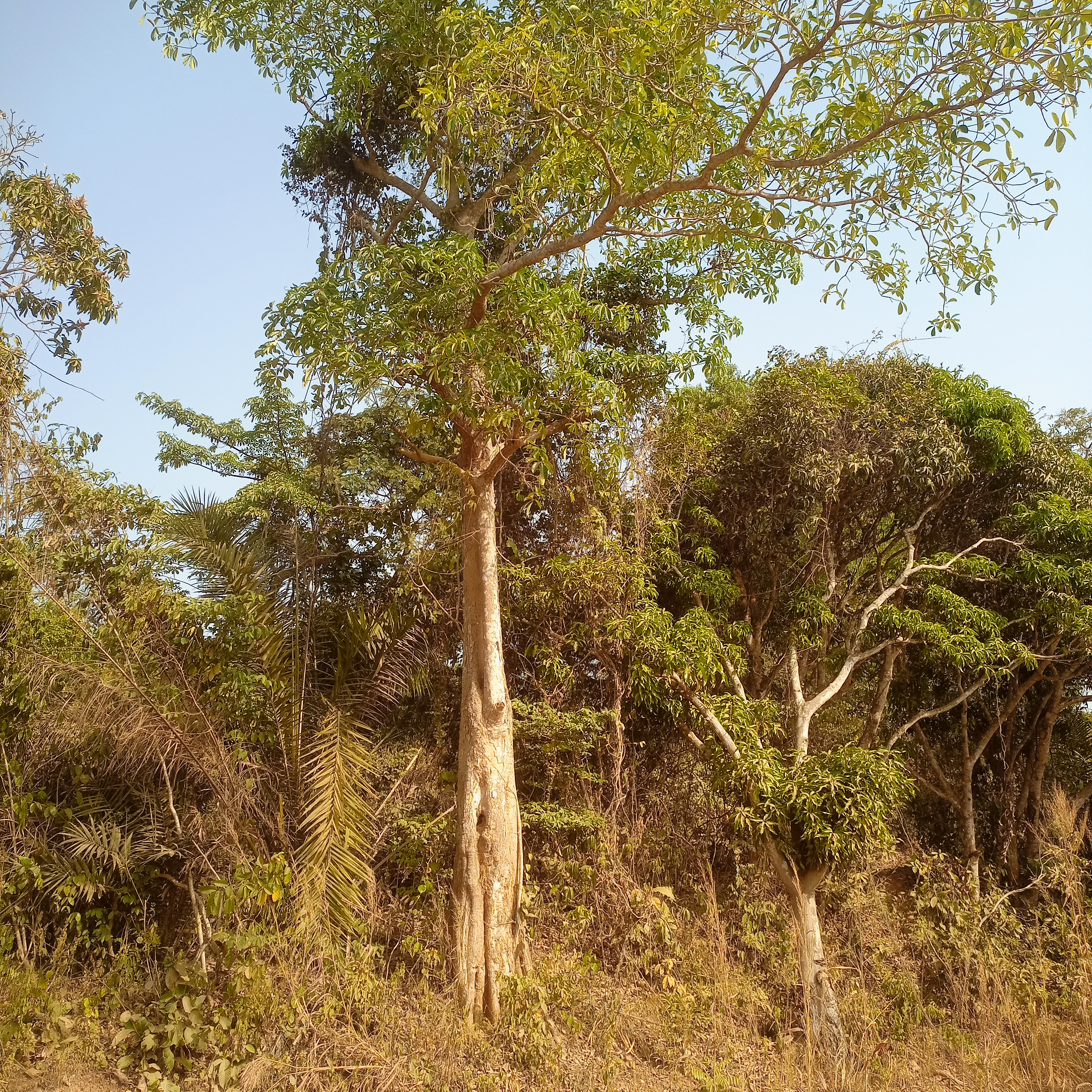

Conservation status
- Least Concern (IUCN 3.1)

Scientific classification
- Kingdom: Plantae
- Clade: Tracheophytes
- Clade: Angiosperms
- Clade: Eudicots
- Clade: Asterids
- Order: Gentianales
- Family: Apocynaceae
- Genus: Alstonia
- Species: A. boonei

Binomial name
- Alstonia boonei De Wild.

= Alstonia boonei =

Species of flowering plant

Alstonia boonei is a very large, deciduous, tropical-forest tree in the family Apocynaceae. It is native to tropical West Africa, with a range extending into Ethiopia and Tanzania. Its common name in the English timber trade is cheese wood, pattern wood or stool wood (see Ashanti Empire golden stool) while its common name in the French timber trade is emien (derived from the vernacular of the Ivory Coast).

The wood is fine-grained, lending itself to detailed carving. Like many other members of the Apocynaceae (a family rich in toxic and medicinal species), A. boonei contains alkaloids and yields latex.

== Description ==
Alstonia boonei is a tall forest tree, which can reach 45 metres (148 ft) in height and 3 m (9.8 ft) in girth, the bole being cylindrical and up to 27 m (89 ft) in height with high, narrow, deep-fluted buttresses. On the Plateaux Batekes in Congo (Kinshasa) these trees have greatly swollen bases like those of the bald cypress and water tupelo. The leaves are borne in whorls at the nodes, the leaf shape is oblanceolate, with the apex rounded to acuminate and the lateral veins (see Leaf#Venation) prominent and almost at right angles to the midrib. The flowers are yellowish-white and borne in lax terminal cymes. The fruits are pendulous, paired, slender follicles up to 16 centimetres (6.3 in) long, containing seeds bearing a tuft of silky, brown floss at either end to allow dispersal by the wind. The latex is white and abundant. The bark and leaves contain the bio-active alkaloid Picrinine.

== Ecology ==
Chimpanzees in the Budongo Forest, Uganda have been observed eating small amounts of bark or dead wood from Alstonia boonei. Individuals who travel to consume this tree have been observed to have diarrhea immediately before accessing it. This rare behavior is consistent with self-medication by the chimpanzees and both bark and dead wood show activity against gram-positive bacteria in laboritory settings.
