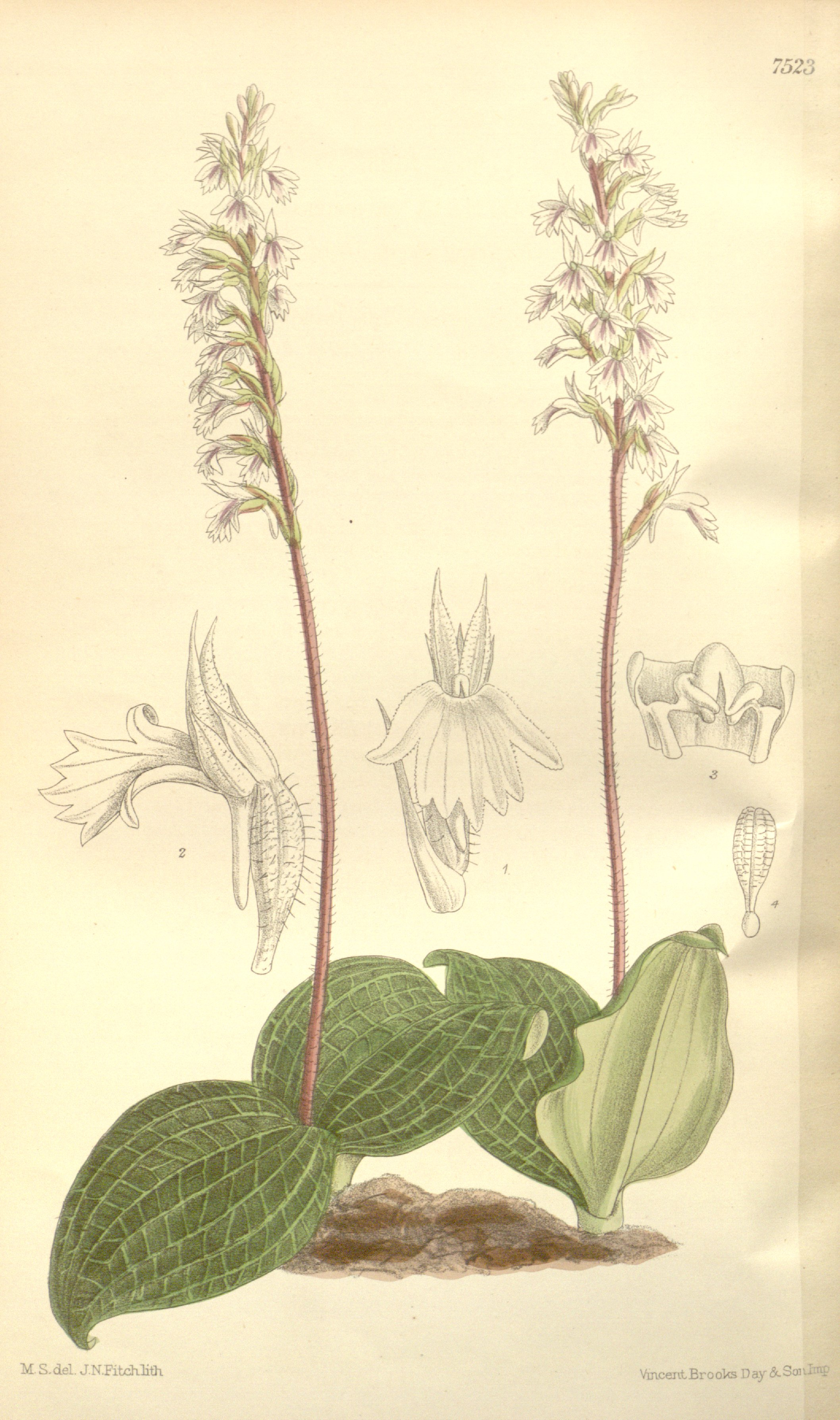
- Holothrix orthoceras, illustration

Scientific classification
- Kingdom: Plantae
- Clade: Tracheophytes
- Clade: Angiosperms
- Clade: Monocots
- Order: Asparagales
- Family: Orchidaceae
- Subfamily: Orchidoideae
- Tribe: Orchideae
- Subtribe: Orchidinae
- Genus: Holothrix; Rich. ex Lindl. (1835), nom. cons.

Synonyms
- Bartholina R.Br. (1813), nom. rej. prop.; Bucculina Lindl. (1837); Deroemera Rchb.f. (1852); Lathrisia Sw. (1829); Monotris Lindl. (1834); Saccidium Lindl. (1835); Scopularia Lindl. (1834); Tryphia Lindl. (1835)

= Holothrix =

Genus of flowering plants

Holothrix is a genus of flowering plants in family Orchidaceae. It includes 48 species native to sub-Saharan Africa and the southwestern Arabian Peninsula.

== Species ==
As of July 2024, Plants of the World Online accepts the following 48 species:.

- Holothrix aphylla (Forssk.) Rchb.f.
- Holothrix arachnoidea (A.Rich.) Rchb.f.
- Holothrix aspera (Lindl.) Rchb.f.
- Holothrix brevipetala Immelman & Schelpe
- Holothrix brongniartiana Rchb.f.
- Holothrix buchananii Schltr.
- Holothrix burchellii (Lindl.) Rchb.f.
- Holothrix burmanniana (L.) Le Péchon & Bytebier
- Holothrix cernua (Burm.f.) Schelpe
- Holothrix condensata Sond.
- Holothrix culveri Bolus
- Holothrix elgonensis Summerh.
- Holothrix etheliae (Bolus) Le Péchon & Bytebier
- Holothrix exilis Lindl.
- Holothrix filicornis Immelman & Schelpe
- Holothrix grandiflora (Sond.) Rchb.f.
- Holothrix hydra P.J.Cribb
- Holothrix incurva Lindl.
- Holothrix johnstonii Rolfe
- Holothrix klimkoana Szlach. & Marg.
- Holothrix longicornu G.J.Lewis
- Holothrix longiflora Rolfe
- Holothrix macowaniana Rchb.f.
- Holothrix majubensis C.Archer & R.H.Archer
- Holothrix micrantha Schltr.
- Holothrix montigena Ridl.
- Holothrix mundii Sond.
- Holothrix nyasae Rolfe
- Holothrix orthoceras (Harv.) Rchb.f.
- Holothrix papillosa Summerh.
- Holothrix parviflora (Lindl.) Rchb.f.
- Holothrix pentadactyla (Summerh.) Summerh.
- Holothrix pilosa (Burch. ex Lindl.) Rchb.f.
- Holothrix pleistodactyla Kraenzl.
- Holothrix praecox Rchb.f.
- Holothrix randii Rendle
- Holothrix schimperi Rchb.f.
- Holothrix schlechteriana Kraenzl. ex Schltr.
- Holothrix scopularia Rchb.f.
- Holothrix secunda (Thunb.) Rchb.f.
- Holothrix socotrana Rolfe
- Holothrix squammata (Hochst. ex A.Rich.) Rchb.f.
- Holothrix thodei Rolfe
- Holothrix tridactylites Summerh.
- Holothrix tridentata (Hook.f.) Rchb.f.
- Holothrix triloba (Rolfe) Kraenzl.
- Holothrix unifolia Rchb.f.
- Holothrix villosa Lindl.
