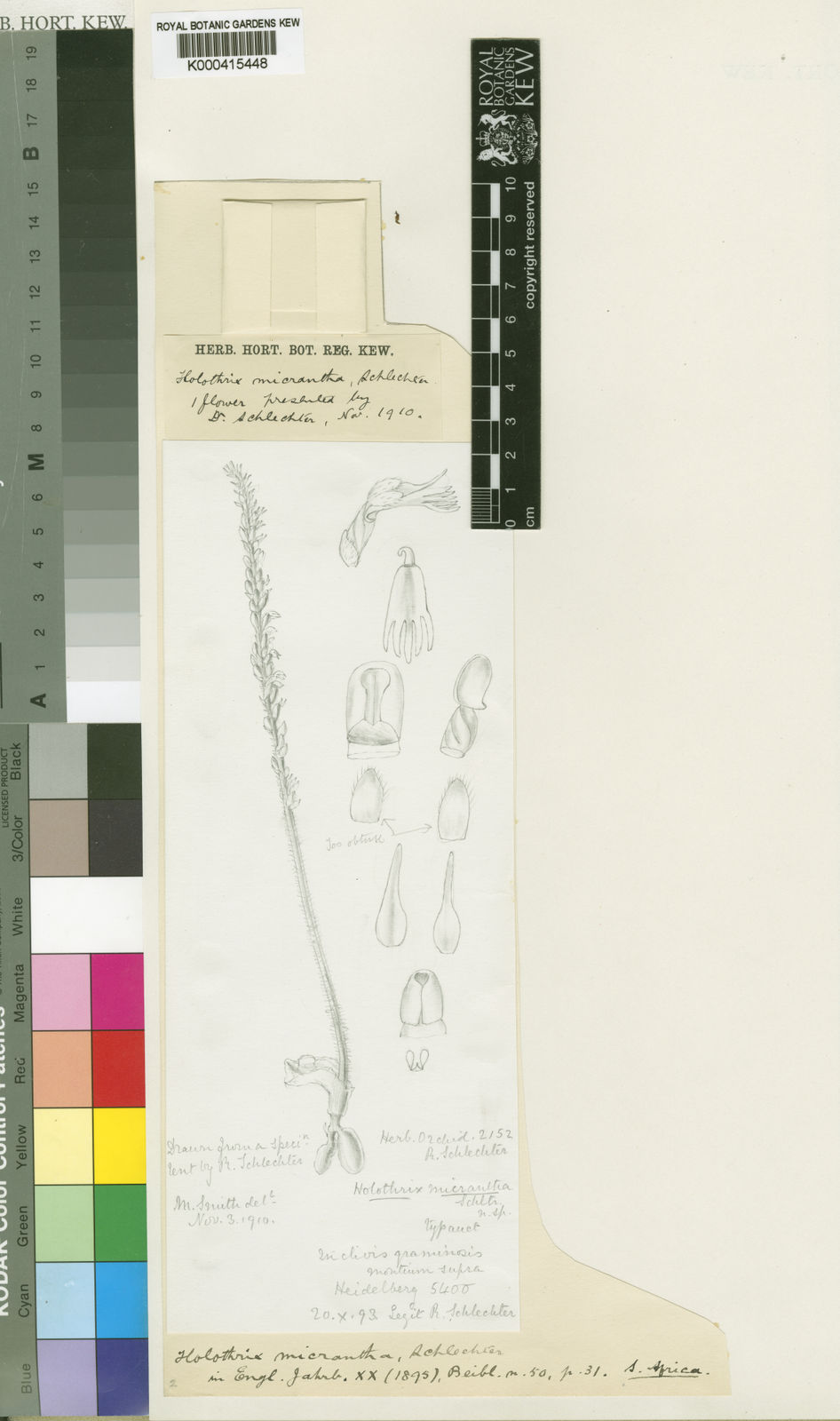
- Holothrix micrantha specimen

Conservation status
- Critically endangered (SANBI Red List)

Scientific classification
- Kingdom: Plantae
- Clade: Tracheophytes
- Clade: Angiosperms
- Clade: Monocots
- Order: Asparagales
- Family: Orchidaceae
- Subfamily: Orchidoideae
- Genus: Holothrix
- Species: H. micrantha

Binomial name
- Holothrix micrantha Schltr.

= Holothrix micrantha =

Orchid endemic to Gauteng, last seen in 1925

Holothrix micrantha is an orchid endemic to Gauteng, South Africa which was last seen in 1925. It is listed on the Red List of South African Plants as "Critically Endangered" and is regarded as possibly extinct— a result of the long absence since it was last recorded given searches have been undertaken in suitable habitat.

== Description ==
It is described as closely resembling Holothrix incurva but smaller, having a denser spike and petals of less than 5mm. The scape has long, straight hairs without bracts; sepals with a few hairs at the tips; petals are undivided with carnose tips; leaves are pilose and withered at flowering; lips carnose divided into five linear, acute lobes; spur broadly conical, curved.

Holothrix micrantha flowers between September and October.

== Distribution ==
Rudolf Schlechter located this species in 1893 on grassy cliffs above Heidelberg at an altitude of around 1800m. Two other possible observations were located from Modderfontein and from a marsh in Killarney; although neither of these have been confirmed. Urban expansion is blamed for destroying subpopulations, however, intact habitat remains in the Suikerbosrand nature reserve; other threats include inappropriate fire management as well as alien invasive plants.
