= Holothrix socotrana =

Conservation status
- Vulnerable (IUCN 3.1)

Scientific classification
- Kingdom: Plantae
- Clade: Tracheophytes
- Clade: Angiosperms
- Clade: Monocots
- Order: Asparagales
- Family: Orchidaceae
- Subfamily: Orchidoideae
- Genus: Holothrix
- Species: H. socotrana

Binomial name
- Holothrix socotrana Rolfe

Species of flowering plant

Holothrix socotrana is a species of plant in the family Orchidaceae. It is endemic to the island of Socotra in Yemen, where it grows in the dense shade of thickets in semi-deciduous montane woodland in the Hajhir Mountains from 800 to 1000 metres elevation.

It is an herb up to 20 cm tall, with two broadly ovate leaves 6 by 4 cm growing flat to the ground, and 10 to 20 flower spikes. Flowers are about 6 mm in diameter, green in color with five subequale lobes growing from a cup-shaped base, and a spur 2 mm in length.
