= Holothrix filicornis =

Conservation status
- Least Concern (IUCN 3.1)

Scientific classification
- Kingdom: Plantae
- Clade: Tracheophytes
- Clade: Angiosperms
- Clade: Monocots
- Order: Asparagales
- Family: Orchidaceae
- Subfamily: Orchidoideae
- Genus: Holothrix
- Species: H. filicornis

Binomial name
- Holothrix filicornis Immelman & Schelpe

Species of flowering plant

Holothrix filicornis is a species of plant in the family Orchidaceae. It is endemic to Namibia. Its natural habitats are subtropical or tropical dry shrubland and rocky areas. It is threatened by habitat loss.
