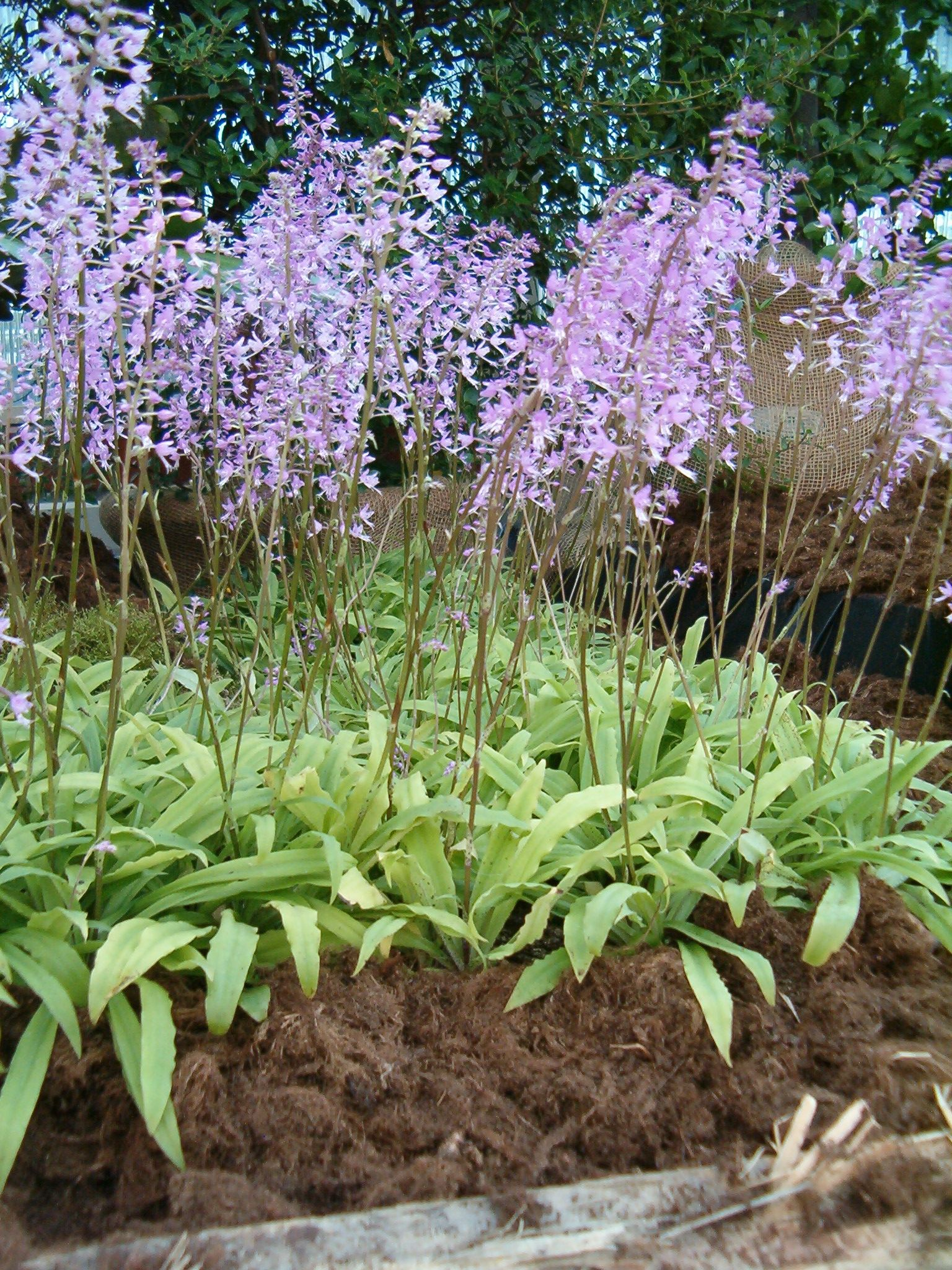
- Massed
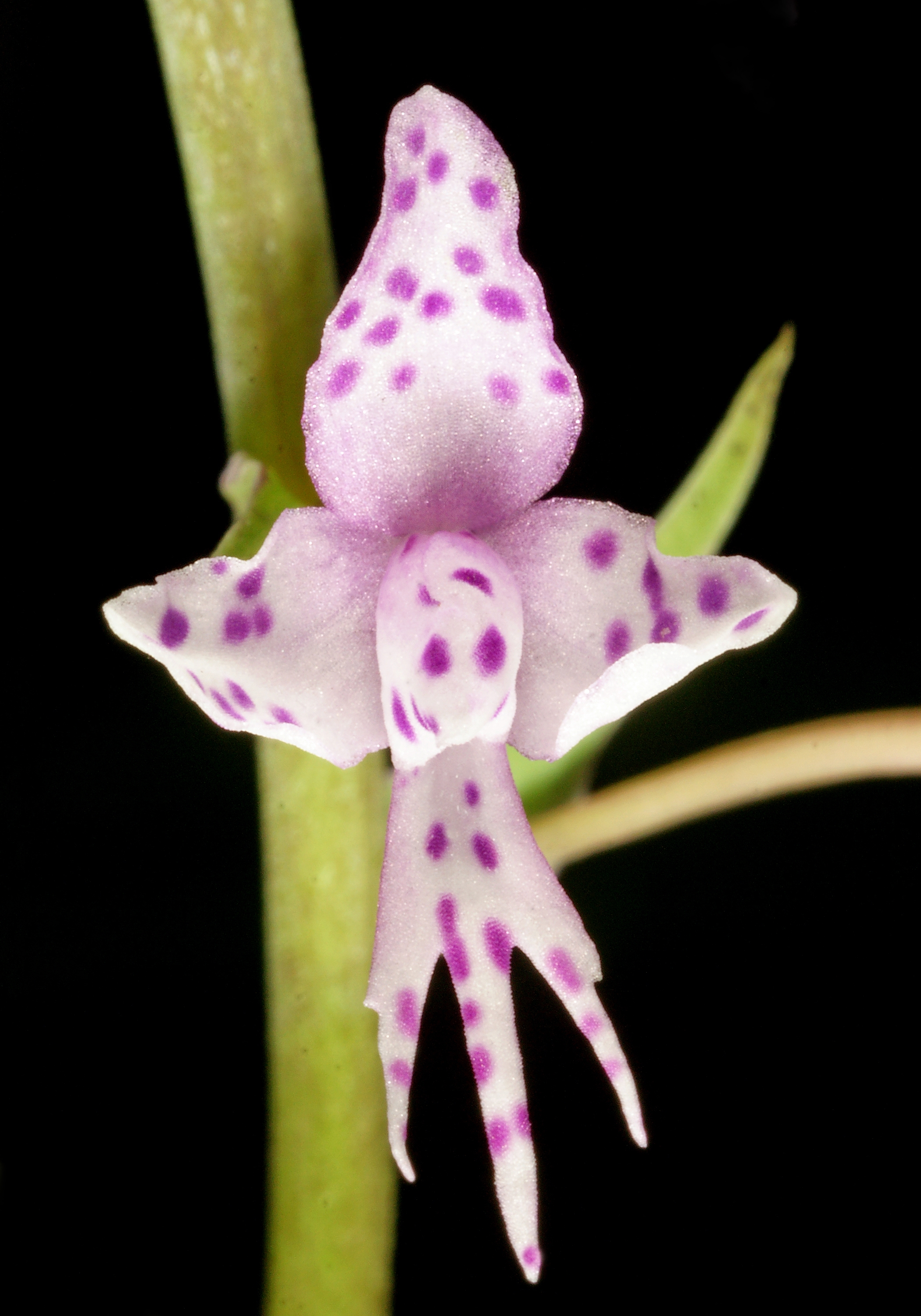
- Close-up of flower

Scientific classification
- Kingdom: Plantae
- Clade: Embryophytes
- Clade: Tracheophytes
- Clade: Angiosperms
- Clade: Monocots
- Order: Asparagales
- Family: Orchidaceae
- Subfamily: Orchidoideae
- Genus: Stenoglottis
- Species: S. longifolia

Binomial name
- Stenoglottis longifolia Hook.f.

Synonyms
- Stenoglottis molweniensis G.McDonald ex J.M.H.Shaw; Stenoglottis molweniensis G.McDonald

= Stenoglottis longifolia =

Species of flowering plant

Stenoglottis longifolia, called the long-leaved stenoglottis, is a species of orchid in the genus Stenoglottis, native to Mozambique, Eswatini, and KwaZulu-Natal in South Africa. It has gained the Royal Horticultural Society's Award of Garden Merit.
