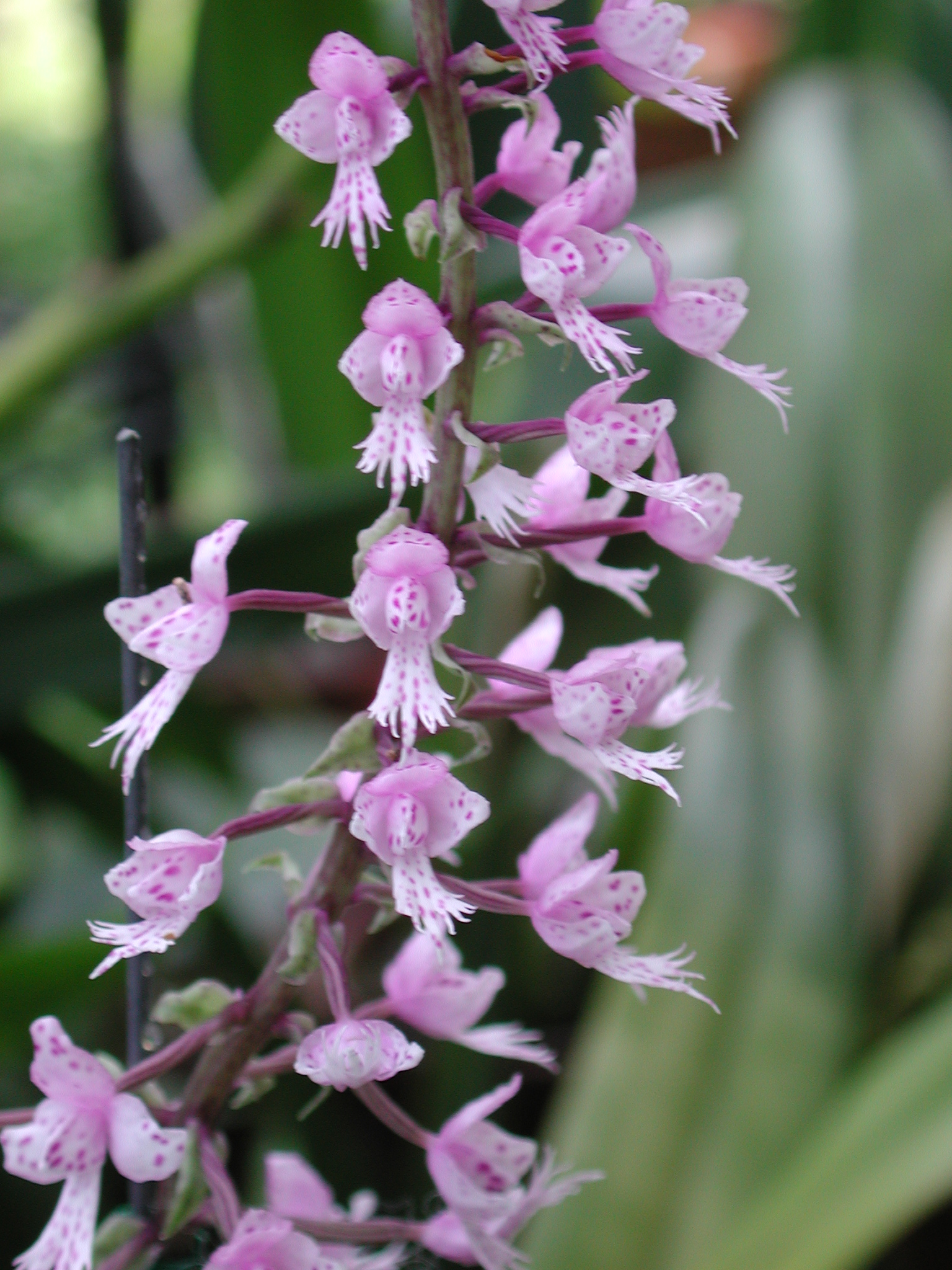
- Stenoglottis fimbriata

Scientific classification
- Kingdom: Plantae
- Clade: Tracheophytes
- Clade: Angiosperms
- Clade: Monocots
- Order: Asparagales
- Family: Orchidaceae
- Subfamily: Orchidoideae
- Tribe: Orchideae
- Subtribe: Orchidinae
- Genus: Stenoglottis; Lindl.

= Stenoglottis =

Genus of flowering plants

Stenoglottis is a genus of flowering plants from the orchid family, Orchidaceae native to southern and eastern Africa. Six of the 8 known species are endemic to South Africa.

- Stenoglottis fimbriata Lindl. – Swaziland, South Africa
- Stenoglottis inandensis G.McDonald & D.G.A.Styles – KwaZulu-Natal
- Stenoglottis longifolia Hook.f . – South Africa
- Stenoglottis macloughlinii (L.Bolus) G.McDonald ex J.M.H.Shaw – South Africa
- Stenoglottis modestus Truter & Joliffe – KwaZulu-Natal
- Stenoglottis molweniensis G.McDonald ex J.M.H.Shaw – KwaZulu-Natal
- Stenoglottis woodii Schltr. – KwaZulu-Natal
- Stenoglottis zambesiaca Rolfe in D.Oliver & auct. suc. – Tanzania, Malawi, Mozambique, Zimbabwe, northeastern South Africa

== See also ==
- List of Orchidaceae genera
