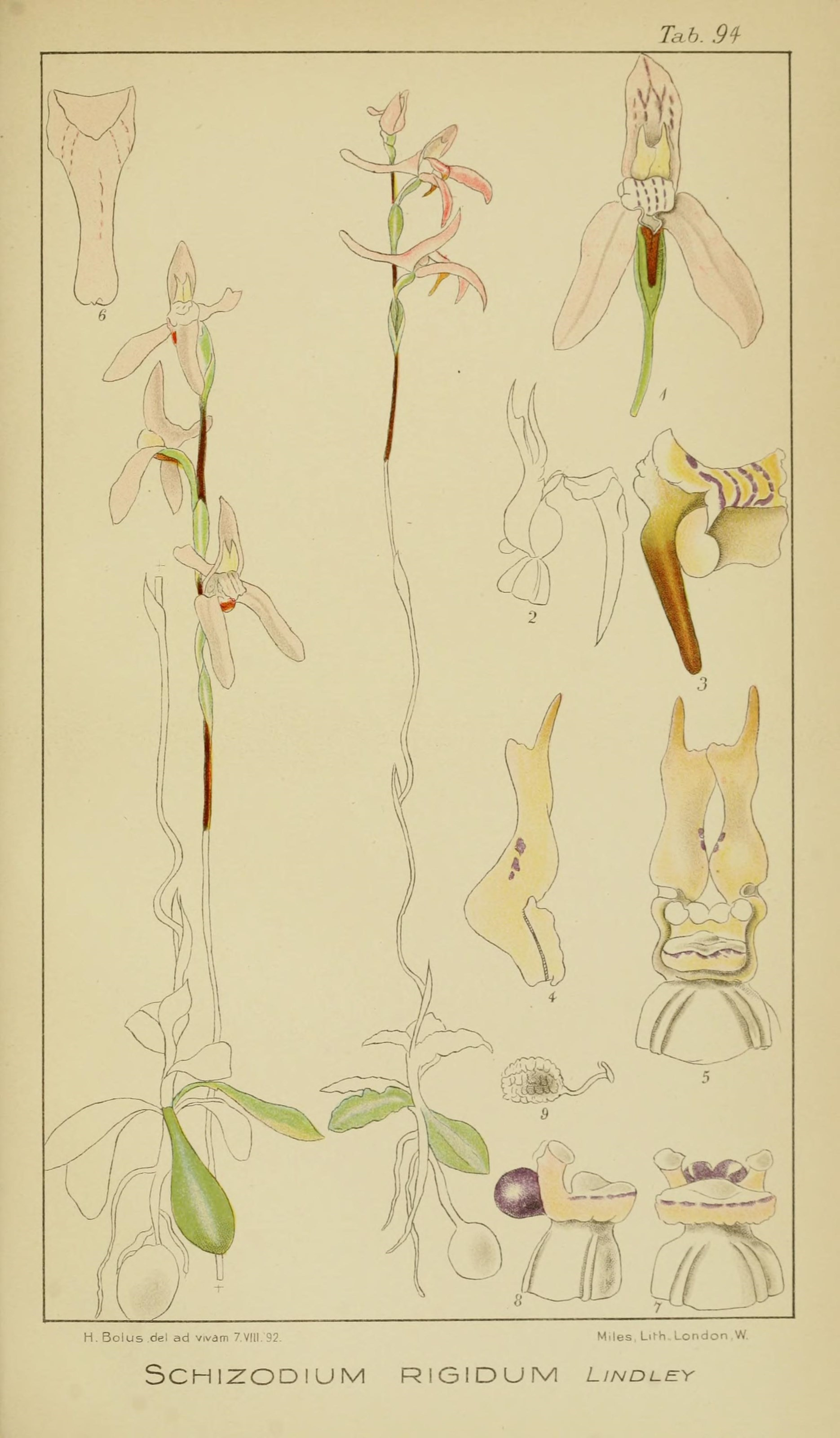

Scientific classification
- Kingdom: Plantae
- Clade: Tracheophytes
- Clade: Angiosperms
- Clade: Monocots
- Order: Asparagales
- Family: Orchidaceae
- Subfamily: Orchidoideae
- Genus: Disa
- Species: D. bifida

Binomial name
- Disa bifida (Thunb.) Sw.

Synonyms
- Satyrium bifidum Thunb.; Schizodium bifidum (Thunb.) Rchb.f.; Schizodium rigidum Lindl.

= Disa bifida =

Species of flowering plant

Disa bifida is a perennial plant and geophyte belonging to the genus Disa and is part of the fynbos. The species is endemic to the Eastern Cape and Western Cape.
