= Disa walleri =

Conservation status
- Least Concern (IUCN 3.1)

Scientific classification
- Kingdom: Plantae
- Clade: Tracheophytes
- Clade: Angiosperms
- Clade: Monocots
- Order: Asparagales
- Family: Orchidaceae
- Subfamily: Orchidoideae
- Genus: Disa
- Species: D. walleri

Binomial name
- Disa walleri Rchb.f., (1881)

Synonyms
- Disa leopoldii De Wild. & T.Durand; Disa princeae Kraenzl.; Disa zombaensis Rendle

Species of flowering plant

Disa walleri is a perennial plant and geophyte belonging to the genus Disa. The plant is native to Burundi, Democratic Republic of the Congo, Malawi, Tanzania, Zambia and Zimbabwe.
