= Disa clavicornis =

Scientific classification
- Kingdom: Plantae
- Clade: Embryophytes
- Clade: Tracheophytes
- Clade: Angiosperms
- Clade: Monocots
- Order: Asparagales
- Family: Orchidaceae
- Subfamily: Orchidoideae
- Genus: Disa
- Species: D. clavicornis

Binomial name
- Disa clavicornis H.P.Linder

Species of flowering plant

Disa clavicornis is a perennial plant and geophyte belonging to the genus Disa. The plant is endemic to Mpumalanga and occurs on Mount Anderson at altitudes of 2000 m. The species has lost habitat to the planting of pine plantations. Mining and prospecting rights and agricultural activities are a threat to the plant.
