= List of Ericales of South Africa =

Flowering plants in the order Ericales recorded from South Africa

The Ericales are a large, diverse and cosmopolitan order of dicotyledonous flowering plants, The order includes trees, bushes, lianas, and herbaceous plants. Together with ordinary autophytic plants, the Ericales include chlorophyll-deficient mycoheterotrophic plants (e.g., Sarcodes sanguinea) and carnivorous plants (e.g., genus Sarracenia). Many species have five petals, often grown together. Fusion of the petals as a trait was traditionally used to place the order in the subclass Sympetalae. Mycorrhizal associations are quite common among the order representatives, and three kinds of mycorrhiza are found exclusively among Ericales (namely, ericoid, arbutoid and monotropoid mycorrhiza). In addition, some families among the order are notable for their exceptional ability to accumulate aluminum. The entire order contains over 8,000 species, of which the Ericaceae account for 2,000-4,000 species (by various estimates).

The anthophytes are a grouping of plant taxa bearing flower-like reproductive structures. They were formerly thought to be a clade comprising plants bearing flower-like structures. The group contained the angiosperms - the extant flowering plants, such as roses and grasses - as well as the Gnetales and the extinct Bennettitales.

23,420 species of vascular plant have been recorded in South Africa, making it the sixth most species-rich country in the world and the most species-rich country on the African continent. Of these, 153 species are considered to be threatened. Nine biomes have been described in South Africa: Fynbos, Succulent Karoo, desert, Nama Karoo, grassland, savanna, Albany thickets, the Indian Ocean coastal belt, and forests.

The 2018 South African National Biodiversity Institute's National Biodiversity Assessment plant checklist lists 35,130 taxa in the phyla Anthocerotophyta (hornworts (6)), Anthophyta (flowering plants (33534)), Bryophyta (mosses (685)), Cycadophyta (cycads (42)), Lycopodiophyta (Lycophytes(45)), Marchantiophyta (liverworts (376)), Pinophyta (conifers (33)), and Pteridophyta (cryptogams (408)).

11 families are represented in the literature. Listed taxa include species, subspecies, varieties, and forms as recorded, some of which have subsequently been allocated to other taxa as synonyms, in which cases the accepted taxon is appended to the listing. Multiple entries under alternative names reflect taxonomic revision over time.

== Actinidiaceae ==
Family: Actinidiaceae,

=== Actinidia ===
Genus Actinidia:

- Actinidia chinensis var. deliciosa (A.Chev.) A.Chev., not indigenous, naturalised, invasive

== Balsaminaceae ==
Family: Balsaminaceae,

=== Impatiens ===
Genus IMPATIENS:

- Impatiens flanaganiae Hemsl. endemic
- Impatiens hochstetteri Warb. indigenous
  - Impatiens hochstetteri Warb. subsp. hochstetteri, indigenous
- Impatiens sodenii Engl. & Warb. not indigenous, cultivated, naturalised
- Impatiens sylvicola Burtt Davy & Greenway, indigenous
- Impatiens walleriana Hook.f. not indigenous, naturalised

== Ebenaceae ==
Family: Ebenaceae,

=== Diospyros ===
Genus Diospyros:

- Diospyros acocksii (De Winter) De Winter, indigenous
- Diospyros austro-africana De Winter, indigenous
  - Diospyros austro-africana De Winter var. austro-africana, endemic
  - Diospyros austro-africana De Winter var. microphylla (Burch.) De Winter, indigenous
  - Diospyros austro-africana De Winter var. rubriflora (De Winter) De Winter, indigenous
  - Diospyros austro-africana De Winter var. rugosa (E.Mey. ex A.DC.) De Winter, endemic
- Diospyros dichrophylla (Gand.) De Winter, indigenous
- Diospyros galpinii (Hiern) De Winter, indigenous
- Diospyros glabra (L.) De Winter, endemic
- Diospyros glandulifera De Winter, endemic
- Diospyros inhacaensis F.White, indigenous
- Diospyros loureiriana G.Don, indigenous
  - Diospyros loureiriana G.Don subsp. loureiriana, indigenous
- Diospyros lycioides Desf. indigenous
  - Diospyros lycioides Desf. subsp. guerkei (Kuntze) De Winter, indigenous
  - Diospyros lycioides Desf. subsp. lycioides, indigenous
  - Diospyros lycioides Desf. subsp. nitens (Harv. ex Hiern) De Winter, endemic
  - Diospyros lycioides Desf. subsp. sericea (Bernh.) De Winter, indigenous
- Diospyros mespiliformis Hochst. ex A.DC. indigenous
- Diospyros natalensis (Harv.) Brenan, indigenous
  - Diospyros natalensis (Harv.) Brenan subsp. natalensis, indigenous
  - Diospyros natalensis (Harv.) Brenan subsp. nummularia (Brenan) Jordaan, indigenous
  - Diospyros nummularia Brenan, accepted as Diospyros natalensis (Harv.) Brenan subsp. nummularia (Brenan) Jordaan, indigenous
- Diospyros pallens (Thunb.) F.White, endemic
- Diospyros ramulosa (E.Mey. ex A.DC.) De Winter, indigenous
- Diospyros rotundifolia Hiern, indigenous
- Diospyros scabrida (Harv. ex Hiern) De Winter, indigenous
  - Diospyros scabrida (Harv. ex Hiern) De Winter var. cordata (E.Mey. ex A.DC.) De Winter, endemic
  - Diospyros scabrida (Harv. ex Hiern) De Winter var. scabrida, endemic
- Diospyros simii (Kuntze) De Winter, endemic
- Diospyros usambarensis F.White, accepted as Diospyros loureiriana G.Don, indigenous
- Diospyros villosa (L.) De Winter, indigenous
  - Diospyros villosa (L.) De Winter var. parvifolia (De Winter) De Winter, endemic
  - Diospyros villosa (L.) De Winter var. villosa, endemic
- Diospyros whyteana (Hiern) F.White, indigenous

=== Euclea ===
Genus Euclea:

- Euclea acutifolia E.Mey. ex A.DC. endemic
- Euclea coriacea A.DC. indigenous
- Euclea crispa (Thunb.) Gurke, indigenous
  - Euclea crispa (Thunb.) Gurke subsp. crispa, indigenous
  - Euclea crispa (Thunb.) Gurke subsp. ovata (Burch.) F.White, indigenous
- Euclea daphnoides Hiern, indigenous
- Euclea dewinteri Retief, endemic
- Euclea divinorum Hiern, indigenous
- Euclea lancea Thunb. endemic
- Euclea linearis Zeyh. ex Hiern, indigenous
- Euclea myrtina Burch. accepted as Euclea undulata Thunb.
- Euclea natalensis A.DC. indigenous
  - Euclea natalensis A.DC. subsp. angustifolia F.White, indigenous
  - Euclea natalensis A.DC. subsp. capensis F.White, endemic
  - Euclea natalensis A.DC. subsp. magutensis F.White, endemic
  - Euclea natalensis A.DC. subsp. natalensis, indigenous
  - Euclea natalensis A.DC. subsp. obovata F.White, indigenous
  - Euclea natalensis A.DC. subsp. rotundifolia F.White, indigenous
- Euclea polyandra (L.f.) E.Mey. ex Hiern, endemic
- Euclea pseudebenus E.Mey. ex A.DC. indigenous
- Euclea racemosa Murray, indigenous
  - Euclea racemosa Murray subsp. bernardii F.White, endemic
  - Euclea racemosa Murray subsp. macrophylla (E.Mey. ex A.DC.) F.White, endemic
  - Euclea racemosa Murray subsp. racemosa, endemic
  - Euclea racemosa Murray subsp. sinuata F.White, indigenous
  - Euclea racemosa Murray subsp. zuluensis F.White, indigenous
- Euclea schimperi (A.DC.) Dandy, indigenous
  - Euclea schimperi (A.DC.) Dandy var. daphnoides (Hiern) De Winter, accepted as Euclea daphnoides Hiern, indigenous
- Euclea sekhukhuniensis Retief, Siebert & A.E.van Wyk, indigenous
- Euclea tomentosa E.Mey. ex A.DC. endemic
- Euclea undulata Thunb. indigenous
  - Euclea undulata Thunb. var. myrtina (Burch.) Hiern, accepted as Euclea undulata Thunb. indigenous

== Ericaceae ==
Family: Ericaceae,

=== Acrostemon ===
Genus Acrostemon:

- Acrostemon barkerae Compton, accepted as Erica eriocephala Lam. present
- Acrostemon equisetoides Klotzsch, accepted as Erica eriocephala Lam. present
- Acrostemon eriocephalus (Klotzsch) N.E.Br. accepted as Erica pilosiflora E.G.H.Oliv. subsp. pilosiflora, present
- Acrostemon glandulosus Rach, accepted as Erica eriocephala Lam. present
- Acrostemon incurvus (Klotzsch) Benth. accepted as Erica eriocephala Lam. present
- Acrostemon schlechteri N.E.Br. accepted as Erica radicans (L.Guthrie) E.G.H.Oliv. subsp. schlechteri (N.E.Br.) E.G.H.Oliv. present
- Acrostemon stokoei L.Guthrie, accepted as Erica eriocephala Lam. present
- Acrostemon xeranthemifolius (Salisb.) E.G.H.Oliv. accepted as Erica xeranthemifolia Salisb. present

=== Anomalanthus ===
Genus Anomalanthus:

- Anomalanthus anguliger N.E.Br. accepted as Erica anguliger (N.E.Br.) E.G.H.Oliv. present
- Anomalanthus collinus N.E.Br. accepted as Erica anguliger (N.E.Br.) E.G.H.Oliv. present
- Anomalanthus curviflorus N.E.Br. accepted as Erica anguliger (N.E.Br.) E.G.H.Oliv. present
- Anomalanthus discolor Klotzsch, accepted as Erica anguliger (N.E.Br.) E.G.H.Oliv. present
- Anomalanthus galpinii N.E.Br. accepted as Erica anguliger (N.E.Br.) E.G.H.Oliv. present
- Anomalanthus marlothii N.E.Br. accepted as Erica anguliger (N.E.Br.) E.G.H.Oliv. present
- Anomalanthus parviflorus (Klotzsch) N.E.Br. accepted as Erica anguliger (N.E.Br.) E.G.H.Oliv. present
- Anomalanthus puberulus (Klotzsch) N.E.Br. accepted as Erica anguliger (N.E.Br.) E.G.H.Oliv. present
- Anomalanthus scoparius Klotzsch, accepted as Erica anguliger (N.E.Br.) E.G.H.Oliv. present
- Anomalanthus turbinatus N.E.Br. accepted as Erica anguliger (N.E.Br.) E.G.H.Oliv. present

=== Arachnocalyx ===
Genus Arachnocalyx:

- Arachnocalyx cereris Compton, accepted as Erica cereris (Compton) E.G.H.Oliv. present
- Arachnocalyx viscidus (N.E.Br.) E.G.H.Oliv. accepted as Erica arachnocalyx E.G.H.Oliv. present

=== Blaeria ===
Genus Blaeria:

- Blaeria barbigera (Salisb.) G.Don, accepted as Erica barbigera Salisb. endemic
- Blaeria campanulata Benth. accepted as Erica equisetifolia Salisb. present
- Blaeria coccinea Klotzsch, accepted as Erica longimontana E.G.H.Oliv. present
- Blaeria dumosa J.C.Wendl. accepted as Erica equisetifolia Salisb. present
  - Blaeria dumosa J.C.Wendl. var. breviflora N.E.Br. accepted as Erica equisetifolia Salisb. present
- Blaeria equisetifolia (Salisb.) G.Don, accepted as Erica equisetifolia Salisb. present
- Blaeria ericoides L. accepted as Erica ericoides (L.) E.G.H.Oliv. present
- Blaeria fastigiata Benth. accepted as Erica longimontana E.G.H.Oliv. present
- Blaeria flava Bolus, accepted as Erica equisetifolia Salisb. present
- Blaeria flexuosa Benth. accepted as Erica multiflexuosa E.G.H.Oliv. present
- Blaeria fuscescens Klotzsch, accepted as Erica fuscescens (Klotzsch) E.G.H.Oliv. present
- Blaeria klotzschii Alm & T.C.E.Fr. accepted as Erica klotzschii (Alm & T.C.E.Fr.) E.G.H.Oliv. present
- Blaeria kraussiana Klotzsch ex Walp. accepted as Erica russakiana E.G.H.Oliv. present
- Blaeria muirii L.Guthrie, accepted as Erica rosacea (L.Guthrie) E.G.H.Oliv. subsp. rosacea, present
- Blaeria oppositifolia L.Guthrie, accepted as Erica equisetifolia Salisb. present
- Blaeria sagittata (Klotzsch ex Benth.) Alm & T.C.E.Fr. accepted as Erica sagittata Klotzsch ex Benth. present

=== Coccosperma ===
Genus Coccosperma:

- Coccosperma areolatum N.E.Br. accepted as Erica areolata (N.E.Br.) E.G.H.Oliv. present
- Coccosperma hexandrum (Klotzsch) Druce, accepted as Erica subcapitata (N.E.Br.) E.G.H.Oliv. present
- Coccosperma rugosum Klotzsch, accepted as Erica rugata E.G.H.Oliv. present

=== Coilostigma ===
Genus Coilostigma:

- Coilostigma glabrum Benth. accepted as Erica burchelliana E.G.H.Oliv. present
- Coilostigma zeyherianum Klotzsch, accepted as Erica zeyheriana (Klotzsch) E.G.H.Oliv. present
  - Coilostigma zeyherianum Klotzsch var. tenuifolium (Klotzsch) E.G.H.Oliv. accepted as Erica zeyheriana (Klotzsch) E.G.H.Oliv. present

=== Eremia ===
Genus Eremia:

- Eremia brevifolia Benth. accepted as Erica velatiflora E.G.H.Oliv. present
- Eremia calycina Compton, accepted as Erica bokkeveldia E.G.H.Oliv. present
- Eremia curvistyla (N.E.Br.) E.G.H.Oliv. accepted as Erica curvistyla (N.E.Br.) E.G.H.Oliv. present
- Eremia florifera Compton, accepted as Erica florifera (Compton) E.G.H.Oliv. present
- Eremia peltata Compton, accepted as Erica cetrata E.G.H.Oliv. present
- Eremia recurvata Klotzsch, accepted as Erica recurvifolia E.G.H.Oliv. present
- Eremia totta (Thunb.) D.Don, accepted as Erica totta Thunb. present

=== Eremiella ===
Genus Eremiella:

- Eremiella outeniquae Compton, accepted as Erica outeniquae (Compton) E.G.H.Oliv. present

=== Erica ===
Genus Erica:

- Erica abbottii E.G.H.Oliv. endemic
- Erica abelii E.G.H.Oliv. endemic
- Erica abietina L. indigenous
  - Erica abietina L. subsp. abietina, endemic
  - Erica abietina L. subsp. atrorosea E.G.H.Oliv. & I.M.Oliv. endemic
  - Erica abietina L. subsp. aurantiaca E.G.H.Oliv. & I.M.Oliv. endemic
  - Erica abietina L. subsp. constantiana E.G.H.Oliv. & I.M.Oliv. endemic
  - Erica abietina L. subsp. diabolis E.G.H.Oliv. & I.M.Oliv. endemic
  - Erica abietina L. subsp. perfoliosa E.G.H.Oliv. & I.M.Oliv. endemic
  - Erica abietina L. subsp. petraea E.G.H.Oliv. & I.M.Oliv. endemic
  - Erica abietina L. var. echiiflora (Bolus) Salter, accepted as Erica abietina L. subsp. diabolis E.G.H.Oliv. & I.M.Oliv. present
- Erica accommodata Klotzsch ex Benth. indigenous
  - Erica accommodata Klotzsch ex Benth. var. accommodata, endemic
  - Erica accommodata Klotzsch ex Benth. var. subviscidula Bolus, endemic
- Erica acockii Compton, accepted as Erica alexandri Guthrie & Bolus subsp. acockii (Compton) E.G.H.Oliv. present
- Erica acuta Andrews, indigenous
  - Erica acuta Andrews var. acuta, endemic
  - Erica acuta Andrews var. breviflora Dulfer, endemic
- Erica adaequata Tausch, indigenous
- Erica adnata L.Bolus, endemic
- Erica adunca Benth. accepted as Erica triceps Link, present
- Erica aemula Guthrie & Bolus, endemic
- Erica aestiva Markotter, indigenous
  - Erica aestiva Markotter var. aestiva, indigenous
  - Erica aestiva Markotter var. minor Dulfer, endemic
- Erica affinis Benth. endemic
- Erica agglutinans E.G.H.Oliv. endemic
- Erica aghillana Guthrie & Bolus, indigenous
  - Erica aghillana Guthrie & Bolus var. aghillana, endemic
  - Erica aghillana Guthrie & Bolus var. latifolia Guthrie & Bolus, endemic
- Erica albens L. indigenous
  - Erica albens L. var. albens, endemic
  - Erica albens L. var. longiflora Benth. endemic
- Erica albertyniae E.G.H.Oliv. endemic
- Erica albescens Klotzsch ex Benth. indigenous
  - Erica albescens Klotzsch ex Benth. var. albescens, endemic
  - Erica albescens Klotzsch ex Benth. var. erecta Bolus, endemic
- Erica albospicata Hilliard & B.L.Burtt, indigenous
- Erica alexandri Guthrie & Bolus, indigenous
  - Erica alexandri Guthrie & Bolus subsp. acockii (Compton) E.G.H.Oliv. endemic
  - Erica alexandri Guthrie & Bolus subsp. alexandri, endemic
- Erica alfredii Guthrie & Bolus, endemic
- Erica algida Bolus, indigenous
- Erica alnea E.G.H.Oliv. endemic
- Erica alopecurus Harv. indigenous
  - Erica alopecurus Harv. var. alopecurus, indigenous
  - Erica alopecurus Harv. var. glabriflora Bolus, endemic
- Erica altevivens H.A.Baker, endemic
- Erica alticola Guthrie & Bolus, endemic
- Erica altiphila E.G.H.Oliv. endemic
- Erica amalophylla E.G.H.Oliv. & I.M.Oliv. endemic
- Erica amatolensis E.G.H.Oliv. endemic
- Erica amicorum E.G.H.Oliv. endemic
- Erica amoena J.C.Wendl. endemic
- Erica amphigena Guthrie & Bolus, endemic
- Erica ampullacea Curtis, indigenous
  - Erica ampullacea Curtis var. ampullacea, endemic
  - Erica ampullacea Curtis var. obbata (Andrews) Bolus, endemic
- Erica andreaei Compton, indigenous
- Erica aneimena Dulfer, endemic
- Erica anemodes E.G.H.Oliv. indigenous
- Erica anguliger (N.E.Br.) E.G.H.Oliv. endemic
- Erica angulosa E.G.H.Oliv. endemic
- Erica annalis E.G.H.Oliv. & I.M.Oliv. endemic
- Erica annectens Guthrie & Bolus, endemic
- Erica anomala Hilliard & B.L.Burtt, endemic
- Erica arachnocalyx E.G.H.Oliv. endemic
- Erica arcuata Compton, endemic
- Erica ardens Andrews, endemic
- Erica arenaria L.Bolus, endemic
- Erica areolata (N.E.Br.) E.G.H.Oliv. indigenous
- Erica argentea Klotzsch ex Benth. indigenous
  - Erica argentea Klotzsch ex Benth. var. argentea, endemic
  - Erica argentea Klotzsch ex Benth. var. rigida Bolus, endemic
- Erica argyrea Guthrie & Bolus, endemic
- Erica aristata Andrews, indigenous
  - Erica aristata Andrews var. aristata, endemic
  - Erica aristata Andrews var. minor (L.Bolus) Dulfer, endemic
  - Erica aristata Andrews var. turrisbabylonica H.A.Baker, endemic
- Erica aristifolia Benth. endemic
- Erica armata Klotzsch ex Benth. indigenous
  - Erica armata Klotzsch ex Benth. var. armata, endemic
  - Erica armata Klotzsch ex Benth. var. breviaristata Bolus, endemic
- Erica artemisioides (Klotzsch) E.G.H.Oliv. endemic
- Erica articularis L. indigenous
  - Erica articularis L. var. articularis, endemic
  - Erica articularis L. var. implexa Bolus, endemic
  - Erica articularis L. var. meyeriana Bolus, endemic
- Erica aspalathifolia Bolus, indigenous
  - Erica aspalathifolia Bolus var. aspalathifolia, endemic
  - Erica aspalathifolia Bolus var. bachmannii Bolus, endemic
- Erica aspalathoides Guthrie & Bolus, endemic
- Erica astroites Guthrie & Bolus, indigenous
  - Erica astroites Guthrie & Bolus var. astroites, endemic
  - Erica astroites Guthrie & Bolus var. minor Guthrie & Bolus, endemic
- Erica atherstonei Diels ex Guthrie & Bolus, endemic
- Erica atricha Dulfer, endemic
- Erica atromontana E.G.H.Oliv. endemic
- Erica atropurpurea Dulfer, endemic
- Erica atrovinosa E.G.H.Oliv. endemic
- Erica auriculata Guthrie & Bolus, accepted as Erica greyi Guthrie & Bolus, present
- Erica autroverna Hilliard, accepted as Erica revoluta (Bolus) L.E.Davidson, present
- Erica autumnalis L.Bolus, endemic
- Erica axillaris Thunb. indigenous
- Erica axilliflora Bartl. endemic
- Erica azaleifolia Salisb. endemic
- Erica baccans L. endemic
- Erica bakeri T.M.Salter, endemic
- Erica banksia Andrews, accepted as Erica banksii Andrews subsp. banksii, endemic
  - Erica banksia Andrews var. purpurea (Andrews) Dulfer, accepted as Erica banksii (Andrews) E.G.H.Oliv. subsp. purpurea Andrews, indigenous
- Erica banksii Andrews, indigenous
  - Erica banksii Andrews subsp. banksii, endemic
  - Erica banksii Andrews subsp. comptonii (T.M.Salter) E.G.H.Oliv. & I.M.Oliv. endemic
  - Erica banksii (Andrews) E.G.H.Oliv. subsp. purpurea Andrews, endemic
- Erica barbigera Salisb. endemic
- Erica barbigeroides E.G.H.Oliv. endemic
- Erica barrydalensis L.Bolus, endemic
- Erica baueri Andrews, indigenous
  - Erica baueri Andrews subsp. baueri, endemic
  - Erica baueri Andrews subsp. gouriquae E.G.H.Oliv. & I.M.Oliv. endemic
- Erica baurii Bolus, endemic
- Erica beatricis Compton, endemic
- Erica benthamiana E.G.H.Oliv. endemic
- Erica bergiana L. indigenous
  - Erica bergiana L. var. bergiana, endemic
  - Erica bergiana L. var. glabra J.C.Wendl. endemic
  - Erica bergiana L. var. parviflora (Klotzsch) Dulfer, endemic
- Erica berzelioides Guthrie & Bolus, endemic
- Erica bibax Salisb. endemic
- Erica bicolor Thunb. endemic
- Erica binaria E.G.H.Oliv. indigenous
- Erica blaerioides E.G.H.Oliv. indigenous
  - Erica blaerioides E.G.H.Oliv. subsp. blaerioides, endemic
  - Erica blaerioides E.G.H.Oliv. subsp. hirsuta E.G.H.Oliv. endemic
- Erica blancheana L.Bolus, accepted as Erica hispidula L. var. hispidula, present
- Erica blandfordii Andrews, endemic
- Erica blenna Salisb. indigenous
  - Erica blenna Salisb. var. blenna, endemic
  - Erica blenna Salisb. var. grandiflora Bolus, endemic
- Erica blesbergensis H.A.Baker, accepted as Erica inamoena Dulfer, present
- Erica bodkinii Guthrie & Bolus, endemic
- Erica bokkeveldia E.G.H.Oliv. endemic
- Erica bolusanthus E.G.H.Oliv. endemic
- Erica bolusiae Salter, indigenous
  - Erica bolusiae Salter var. bolusiae, endemic
  - Erica bolusiae Salter var. cyathiformis H.A.Baker, endemic
- Erica borboniifolia Salisb. endemic
- Erica botryoides Dulfer, endemic
- Erica boucheri E.G.H.Oliv. indigenous
- Erica brachialis Salisb. endemic
- Erica brachycentra Benth. endemic
- Erica brachysepala Guthrie & Bolus, endemic
- Erica bracteolaris Lam. endemic
- Erica bredasiana E.G.H.Oliv. indigenous
- Erica brevicaulis Guthrie & Bolus, endemic
- Erica breviflora Dulfer, accepted as Erica plukenetii L. subsp. breviflora (Dulfer) E.G.H.Oliv. & I.M.Oliv. present
- Erica brevifolia Sol. ex Salisb. endemic
- Erica brownii E.G.H.Oliv. endemic
- Erica brownleeae Bolus, endemic
- Erica bruniades L. endemic
- Erica bruniifolia Salisb. indigenous
  - Erica bruniifolia Salisb. var. barbigera (Klotzsch ex Benth.) Dulfer, endemic
  - Erica bruniifolia Salisb. var. bruniifolia, endemic
  - Erica bruniifolia Salisb. var. solandroides (Andrews) Dulfer, endemic
  - Erica bruniifolia Salisb. var. stellata (Lodd.) Dulfer, endemic
  - Erica bruniifolia Salisb. var. subglabra Dulfer, endemic
- Erica burchelliana E.G.H.Oliv. endemic
- Erica cabernetea E.G.H.Oliv. endemic
- Erica caespitosa Hilliard & B.L.Burtt, indigenous
- Erica afra L. indigenous
  - Erica afra L. var. afra, indigenous
  - Erica afra L. var. auricularis (Salisb.) Bolus, endemic
- Erica afrorum Bolus, indigenous
  - Erica afrorum Bolus var. afrorum, indigenous
  - Erica afrorum Bolus var. aristula Bolus, endemic
  - Erica afrorum Bolus var. glomerata Bolus, endemic
  - Erica afrorum Bolus var. luxurians Bolus, endemic
- Erica calcareophila E.G.H.Oliv. endemic
- Erica calcicola (E.G.H.Oliv.) E.G.H.Oliv. indigenous
- Erica caledonica A.Spreng. endemic
- Erica calycina L. indigenous
  - Erica calycina L. var. calycina, endemic
  - Erica calycina L. var. fragrans (Andrews) Bolus, endemic
  - Erica calycina L. var. longibracteata Esterh. & T.M.Salter, endemic
  - Erica calycina L. var. periplociflora (Salisb.) Bolus, endemic
  - Erica calycina L. var. vespertina (L.f.) Dulfer, endemic
  - Erica calycina L. var. viscidiflora (Esterh.) Dulfer, accepted as Erica viscidiflora Esterh. present
- Erica cameronii L.Bolus, endemic
- Erica campanularis Salisb. endemic
- Erica canaliculata Andrews, endemic
- Erica canescens J.C.Wendl. indigenous
  - Erica canescens J.C.Wendl. var. canescens, endemic
  - Erica canescens J.C.Wendl. var. micranthera (Bolus) Dulfer, endemic
- Erica capensis Salter, endemic
- Erica capillaris Bartl. indigenous
  - Erica capillaris Bartl. var. capillaris, endemic
  - Erica capillaris Bartl. var. poliotes Bolus, endemic
- Erica capitata L. endemic
- Erica caprina E.G.H.Oliv. endemic
- Erica carduifolia Salisb. endemic
- Erica casta Guthrie & Bolus, accepted as Erica regia Bartl. subsp. regia, indigenous
  - Erica casta Guthrie & Bolus var. breviflora Guthrie & Bolus, accepted as Erica regia Bartl. subsp. regia, present
- Erica caterviflora Salisb. indigenous
  - Erica caterviflora Salisb. var. caterviflora, endemic
  - Erica caterviflora Salisb. var. glabrata Benth. endemic
- Erica cavartica E.G.H.Oliv. & I.M.Oliv. endemic
- Erica cederbergensis Compton, endemic
- Erica cedromontana E.G.H.Oliv. endemic
- Erica ceraria E.G.H.Oliv. & I.M.Oliv. endemic
- Erica cereris (Compton) E.G.H.Oliv. endemic
- Erica cerinthoides L. indigenous
  - Erica cerinthoides L. var. barbertona (Galpin) Bolus, indigenous
  - Erica cerinthoides L. var. cerinthoides, indigenous
- Erica cernua Montin, endemic
- Erica cetrata E.G.H.Oliv. endemic
- Erica chamissonis Klotzsch ex Benth. indigenous
  - Erica chamissonis Klotzsch ex Benth. var. chamissonis, endemic
  - Erica chamissonis Klotzsch ex Benth. var. hirtifolia Dulfer, endemic
  - Erica chamissonis Klotzsch ex Benth. var. polyantha (Klotzsch ex Benth.) Dulfer, endemic
- Erica chartacea Guthrie & Bolus, endemic
- Erica chionodes E.G.H.Oliv. endemic
- Erica chionophila Guthrie & Bolus, endemic
- Erica chiroptera E.G.H.Oliv. endemic
- Erica chlamydiflora Salisb. accepted as Erica brevifolia Sol. ex Salisb. present
- Erica chloroloma Lindl. endemic
- Erica chlorosepala Benth. endemic
- Erica chonantha Dulfer, indigenous
  - Erica chonantha Dulfer var. chonantha, endemic
  - Erica chonantha Dulfer var. longistyla Dulfer, endemic
- Erica chrysocodon Guthrie & Bolus, endemic
- Erica cincta L.Bolus, endemic
- Erica clavisepala Guthrie & Bolus, endemic
- Erica coacervata H.A.Baker, endemic
- Erica coarctata J.C.Wendl. indigenous
  - Erica coarctata J.C.Wendl. var. coarctata, endemic
- Erica coarctata J.C.Wendl. var. longipes (Bartl.) Bolus, endemic
- Erica coccinea L. indigenous
  - Erica coccinea L. subsp. coccinea, endemic
  - Erica coccinea L. subsp. uniflora E.G.H.Oliv. & I.M.Oliv. endemic
  - Erica coccinea L. var. inflata H.A.Baker, accepted as Erica melastoma Andrews subsp. melastoma, present
  - Erica coccinea L. var. intermedia (Klotzsch ex Benth.) Dulfer, accepted as Erica intermedia Klotzsch ex Benth. subsp. intermedia, present
  - Erica coccinea L. var. melastoma (Andrews) H.A.Baker, accepted as Erica melastoma Andrews subsp. melastoma, present
  - Erica coccinea L. var. pubescens (Bolus) Dulfer, accepted as Erica coccinea L. subsp. coccinea, present
  - Erica coccinea L. var. willdenovii (Bolus) H.A.Baker, accepted as Erica melastoma Andrews subsp. melastoma, present
- Erica collina Guthrie & Bolus, endemic
- Erica colorans Andrews, endemic
  - Erica colorans Andrews var. breviflora H.A.Baker, accepted as Erica plena L.Bolus, present
  - Erica colorans Andrews var. hispidula H.A.Baker, endemic
- Erica columnaris E.G.H.Oliv. endemic
- Erica comata Guthrie & Bolus, endemic
- Erica comptonii T.M.Salter, accepted as Erica banksii Andrews subsp. comptonii (T.M.Salter) E.G.H.Oliv. & I.M.Oliv. present
- Erica condensata Benth. indigenous
  - Erica condensata Benth. var. condensata, endemic
  - Erica condensata Benth. var. quadrifida Bolus, endemic
- Erica conferta Andrews, endemic
- Erica conica Lodd. accepted as Erica abietina L. subsp. constantiana E.G.H.Oliv. & I.M.Oliv. present
- Erica conspicua Sol. endemic
  - Erica conspicua Sol. subsp. conspicua, endemic
  - Erica conspicua Sol. subsp. roseoflora E.G.H.Oliv. & I.M.Oliv. endemic
- Erica constantia Nois. ex Benth. endemic
- Erica cooperi Bolus, indigenous
  - Erica cooperi Bolus var. cooperi, endemic
  - Erica cooperi Bolus var. missionis Bolus, indigenous
- Erica copiosa J.C.Wendl. indigenous
  - Erica copiosa J.C.Wendl. var. copiosa, endemic
  - Erica copiosa J.C.Wendl. var. linearisepala Bolus, endemic
  - Erica copiosa J.C.Wendl. var. parvisepala Bolus, accepted as Erica florifera (Compton) E.G.H.Oliv. present
- Erica cordata Andrews, indigenous
  - Erica cordata Andrews var. arachnoidea (Klotzsch) Dulfer, endemic
  - Erica cordata Andrews var. cordata, endemic
- Erica corifolia L. indigenous
  - Erica corifolia L. var. bracteata (Thunb.) Dulfer, endemic
  - Erica corifolia L. var. concolor Dulfer, endemic
  - Erica corifolia L. var. corifolia, endemic
  - Erica corifolia L. var. erectiuscula (J.C.Wendl.) Dulfer, endemic
- Erica coronanthera Compton, endemic
- Erica coruscans L.Bolus, endemic
  - Erica coruscans L.Bolus var. minor L.Bolus, accepted as Erica aristata Andrews var. minor (L.Bolus) Dulfer, endemic
- Erica corydalis Salisb. endemic
- Erica costatisepala H.A.Baker, endemic
- Erica crassisepala Benth. endemic
- Erica crateriformis Guthrie & Bolus, endemic
- Erica cremea Dulfer, endemic
- Erica cristata Dulfer, endemic
- Erica cristiflora Salisb. indigenous
  - Erica cristiflora Salisb. var. blanda (Salisb.) Bolus, endemic
  - Erica cristiflora Salisb. var. cristiflora, endemic
  - Erica cristiflora Salisb. var. moschata (Andrews) Dulfer, endemic
- Erica croceovirens E.G.H.Oliv. & I.M.Oliv. endemic
- Erica crucistigmatica Dulfer, accepted as Erica gnaphaloides L. present
- Erica cruenta Sol. endemic
  - Erica cruenta Sol. var. buccinula Bolus, accepted as Erica cruenta Sol. endemic
  - Erica cruenta Sol. var. campanulata Bolus, accepted as Erica elimensis L.Bolus var. elimensis, endemic
  - Erica cruenta Sol. var. mutica Bolus, accepted as Erica cruenta Sol. endemic
- Erica cryptanthera Guthrie & Bolus, endemic
- Erica cubica L. indigenous
  - Erica cubica L. var. coronifera Bolus, endemic
  - Erica cubica L. var. cubica, endemic
  - Erica cubica L. var. natalensis Bolus, endemic
- Erica cubitans E.G.H.Oliv. indigenous
- Erica cumuliflora Salisb. endemic
- Erica cunoniensis E.G.H.Oliv. endemic
- Erica cupuliflora Dulfer, accepted as Erica florifera (Compton) E.G.H.Oliv. present
- Erica curtophylla Guthrie & Bolus, endemic
- Erica curviflora L. endemic
  - Erica curviflora L. var. burchellii (Benth.) Bolus, accepted as Erica curviflora L. endemic
  - Erica curviflora L. var. diffusa Bolus, accepted as Erica curviflora L. endemic
  - Erica curviflora L. var. splendens (J.C.Wendl.) Dulfer, accepted as Erica conspicua Sol. present
  - Erica curviflora L. var. sulcata (Benth.) Dulfer, accepted as Erica curviflora L. endemic
  - Erica curviflora L. var. sulphurea (Andrews) Bolus, accepted as Erica curviflora L. endemic
  - Erica curviflora L. var. versatilis Bolus, accepted as Erica curviflora L. endemic
- Erica curvifolia Salisb. indigenous
  - Erica curvifolia Salisb. var. curvifolia, endemic
  - Erica curvifolia Salisb. var. zeyheri Bolus, endemic
- Erica curvirostris Salisb. indigenous
  - Erica curvirostris Salisb. var. curvirostris, endemic
  - Erica curvirostris Salisb. var. longisepala L.Bolus, endemic
- Erica curvistyla (N.E.Br.) E.G.H.Oliv. endemic
- Erica cuscutiformis Dulfer, endemic
- Erica cyathiformis Salisb. indigenous
  - Erica cyathiformis Salisb. var. cyathiformis, endemic
  - Erica cyathiformis Salisb. var. orientalis L.Bolus, endemic
- Erica cygnea Salter, endemic
- Erica cylindrica Thunb. endemic
- Erica cymosa E.Mey. ex Benth. indigenous
  - Erica cymosa E.Mey. ex Benth. subsp. cymosa, endemic
  - Erica cymosa E.Mey. ex Benth. subsp. grandiflora E.G.H.Oliv. & I.M.Oliv. endemic
- Erica cyrilliflora Salisb. endemic
- Erica daphniflora Salisb. indigenous
  - Erica daphniflora Salisb. var. daphniflora, endemic
  - Erica daphniflora Salisb. var. latisepala Bolus, endemic
  - Erica daphniflora Salisb. var. leipoldtii Bolus, endemic
  - Erica daphniflora Salisb. var. muscari (Andrews) Bolus, endemic
  - Erica daphniflora Salisb. var. pedicellata (Klotzsch) Bolus, endemic
- Erica deflexa Sinclair, endemic
- Erica deliciosa H.L.Wendl. ex Benth. accepted as Erica nutans J.C.Wendl. present
- Erica demissa Klotzsch ex Benth. indigenous
  - Erica demissa Klotzsch ex Benth. var. crassifolia Dulfer, endemic
  - Erica demissa Klotzsch ex Benth. var. demissa, endemic
- Erica densifolia Willd. endemic
- Erica denticulata L. indigenous
  - Erica denticulata L. var. denticulata, endemic
  - Erica denticulata L. var. grandiloba Bolus, endemic
  - Erica denticulata L. var. longiflora Bolus, endemic
  - Erica denticulata L. var. retusa (Tausch) Dulfer, endemic
- Erica depressa L. endemic
- Erica desmantha Benth. indigenous
  - Erica desmantha Benth. var. desmantha, endemic
  - Erica desmantha Benth. var. urceolata H.A.Baker, endemic
- Erica dianthifolia Salisb. endemic
- Erica diaphana Spreng. endemic
- Erica dichrus Spreng. accepted as Erica unicolor J.C.Wendl. subsp. mutica E.G.H.Oliv. & I.M.Oliv. endemic
- Erica diosmifolia Salisb. endemic
- Erica diotiflora Salisb. endemic
- Erica discolor Andrews var. puberula Benth. accepted as Erica discolor Andrews, endemic
- Erica dispar (N.E.Br.) E.G.H.Oliv. endemic
- Erica dissimulans Hilliard & B.L.Burtt, indigenous
- Erica distorta Bartl. endemic
- Erica dodii Guthrie & Bolus, endemic
- Erica dolfiana E.G.H.Oliv. & I.M.Oliv. endemic
- Erica doliiformis Salisb. endemic
- Erica dominans Killick, indigenous
- Erica dracomontana E.G.H.Oliv. indigenous
- Erica drakensbergensis Guthrie & Bolus, indigenous
- Erica dregei E.G.H.Oliv. endemic
- Erica duthieae L.Bolus, endemic
- Erica dysantha Benth. endemic
- Erica ebracteata Bolus, endemic
- Erica eburnea Salter, endemic
- Erica ecklonii E.G.H.Oliv. endemic
- Erica eglandulosa (Klotzsch) E.G.H.Oliv. indigenous
- Erica elimensis L.Bolus, indigenous
  - Erica elimensis L.Bolus var. elimensis, endemic
  - Erica elimensis L.Bolus var. parvibracteata L.Bolus, endemic
- Erica ellipticiflora Dulfer, accepted as Erica regerminans L. present
- Erica elsieana (E.G.H.Oliv.) E.G.H.Oliv. endemic
- Erica embothriifolia Salisb. indigenous
  - Erica embothriifolia Salisb. var. embothriifolia, endemic
  - Erica embothriifolia Salisb. var. longiflora Bolus, endemic
  - Erica embothriifolia Salisb. var. subaequalis Bolus, endemic
- Erica empetrina L. endemic
- Erica equisetifolia Salisb. endemic
- Erica erasmia Dulfer, endemic
- Erica eremioides (MacOwan) E.G.H.Oliv. indigenous
  - Erica eremioides (MacOwan) E.G.H.Oliv. subsp. eglandula (N.E.Br.) E.G.H.Oliv. endemic
  - Erica eremioides (MacOwan) E.G.H.Oliv. subsp. eremioides, endemic
  - Erica eremioides (MacOwan) E.G.H.Oliv. subsp. pubescens (E.G.H.Oliv.) E.G.H.Oliv. endemic
- Erica ericoides (L.) E.G.H.Oliv. endemic
- Erica erinus (Klotzsch ex Benth.) E.G.H.Oliv. indigenous
- Erica eriocephala Lam. endemic
- Erica eriocodon Bolus, endemic
- Erica eriophoros Guthrie & Bolus, endemic
- Erica esterhuyseniae Compton, endemic
  - Erica esterhuyseniae Compton var. tetramera Compton, accepted as Erica esterhuyseniae Compton, present
  - Erica esterhuyseniae Compton var. trimera Compton, accepted as Erica oreotragus E.G.H.Oliv. present
- Erica esteriana E.G.H.Oliv. indigenous
  - Erica esteriana E.G.H.Oliv. subsp. esteriana, endemic
  - Erica esteriana E.G.H.Oliv. subsp. swartbergensis (E.G.H.Oliv.) E.G.H.Oliv. endemic
- Erica etheliae L.Bolus, endemic
- Erica eugenea Dulfer, endemic
- Erica euryphylla R.C.Turner, endemic
- Erica eustacei L.Bolus, endemic
- Erica evansii (N.E.Br.) E.G.H.Oliv. indigenous
- Erica excavata L.Bolus, endemic
- Erica exleeana E.G.H.Oliv. endemic
- Erica extrusa Compton, endemic
- Erica fairii Bolus, endemic
- Erica fascicularis L.f. indigenous
  - Erica fascicularis L.f. var. fascicularis, endemic
  - Erica fascicularis L.f. var. imperialis (Andrews) Bolus, endemic
- Erica fastigiata L. indigenous
  - Erica fastigiata L. var. coventryi Bolus, endemic
  - Erica fastigiata L. var. fastigiata, endemic
  - Erica fastigiata L. var. immaculata Bolus, endemic
  - Erica fastigiata L. var. longituba L.Bolus, endemic
- Erica fausta Salisb. endemic
- Erica feminarum E.G.H.Oliv. endemic
- Erica ferrea P.J.Bergius, endemic
- Erica fervida L.Bolus, accepted as Erica pillansii Bolus subsp. fervida (L.Bolus) E.G.H.Oliv. & I.M.Oliv. endemic
- Erica filamentosa Andrews, endemic
  - Erica filamentosa Andrews var. longiflora Bolus, accepted as Erica nematophylla Guthrie & Bolus, present
- Erica filialis E.G.H.Oliv. endemic
- Erica filiformis Salisb. indigenous
  - Erica filiformis Salisb. var. filiformis, endemic
  - Erica filiformis Salisb. var. longibracteata Bolus, endemic
  - Erica filiformis Salisb. var. maritima Bolus, accepted as Erica radicans (L.Guthrie) E.G.H.Oliv. subsp. schlechteri (N.E.Br.) E.G.H.Oliv. present
- Erica filipendula Benth. indigenous
  - Erica filipendula Benth. subsp. filipendula, endemic
  - Erica filipendula Benth. subsp. parva E.G.H.Oliv. & I.M.Oliv. endemic
  - Erica filipendula Benth. var. major Bolus, accepted as Erica penduliflora E.G.H.Oliv. present
- Erica fimbriata Andrews, endemic
- Erica flacca E.Mey. ex Benth. endemic
- Erica flanaganii Bolus, indigenous
- Erica flavicoma Bartl. endemic
- Erica flexistyla E.G.H.Oliv. endemic
- Erica floccifera Zahlbr. endemic
- Erica flocciflora Benth. endemic
- Erica florifera (Compton) E.G.H.Oliv. endemic
- Erica foliacea Andrews, indigenous
  - Erica foliacea Andrews subsp. foliacea, endemic
  - Erica foliacea Andrews subsp. fulgens (Klotzsch) E.G.H.Oliv. & I.M.Oliv. endemic
  - Erica foliacea Andrews var. fulgens (Klotzsch) Bolus, accepted as Erica foliacea Andrews subsp. fulgens (Klotzsch) E.G.H.Oliv. & I.M.Oliv. endemic
  - Erica foliacea Andrews var. galpinii (Salter) Dulfer, accepted as Erica galpinii T.M.Salter, present
- Erica fontana L.Bolus, endemic
- Erica formosa Thunb. endemic
- Erica fourcadei L.Bolus, accepted as Erica glandulosa Thunb. subsp. fourcadei (L.Bolus) E.G.H.Oliv. & I.M.Oliv. endemic
- Erica frigida Bolus, indigenous
- Erica fuscescens (Klotzsch) E.G.H.Oliv. endemic
- Erica galgebergensis H.A.Baker, endemic
- Erica gallorum L.Bolus, accepted as Erica viscaria L. subsp. gallorum (L.Bolus) E.G.H.Oliv. & I.M.Oliv. present
- Erica galpinii T.M.Salter, endemic
- Erica garciae E.G.H.Oliv. indigenous
- Erica genistifolia Salisb. endemic
- Erica georgica Guthrie & Bolus, endemic
- Erica gerhardii E.G.H.Oliv. & I.M.Oliv. endemic
- Erica gibbosa Klotzsch ex Benth. accepted as Erica scabriuscula Lodd. present
- Erica gigantea Klotzsch ex Benth. endemic
- Erica gillii Benth. endemic
- Erica gilva J.C.Wendl. accepted as Erica mammosa L. present
- Erica glabella Thunb. indigenous
  - Erica glabella Thunb. subsp. glabella, endemic
  - Erica glabella Thunb. subsp. laevis E.G.H.Oliv. endemic
- Erica glabripes L.Bolus, endemic
- Erica glandulifera Klotzsch, endemic
- Erica glandulipila Compton, endemic
- Erica glandulosa Thunb. indigenous
  - Erica glandulosa Thunb. subsp. bondiae (Compton) E.G.H.Oliv. & I.M.Oliv. endemic
  - Erica glandulosa Thunb. subsp. breviflora (Bolus) E.G.H.Oliv. & I.M.Oliv. endemic
  - Erica glandulosa Thunb. subsp. fourcadei (L.Bolus) E.G.H.Oliv. & I.M.Oliv. endemic
  - Erica glandulosa Thunb. subsp. glandulosa, endemic
  - Erica glandulosa Thunb. var. bondiae (Compton) Dulfer, accepted as Erica glandulosa Thunb. subsp. bondiae (Compton) E.G.H.Oliv. & I.M.Oliv. endemic
  - Erica glandulosa Thunb. var. breviflora Bolus, accepted as Erica glandulosa Thunb. subsp. breviflora (Bolus) E.G.H.Oliv. & I.M.Oliv. endemic
- Erica glaphyra Killick, endemic
- Erica glauca Andrews, indigenous
  - Erica glauca Andrews var. elegans (Andrews) Bolus, endemic
  - Erica glauca Andrews var. glauca, endemic
- Erica globiceps (N.E.Br.) E.G.H.Oliv. indigenous
  - Erica globiceps (N.E.Br.) E.G.H.Oliv. subsp. consors (N.E.Br.) E.G.H.Oliv. endemic
  - Erica globiceps (N.E.Br.) E.G.H.Oliv. subsp. globiceps, endemic
  - Erica globiceps (N.E.Br.) E.G.H.Oliv. subsp. gracilis (Benth.) E.G.H.Oliv. endemic
- Erica globulifera Dulfer, endemic
- Erica glomiflora Salisb. indigenous
  - Erica glomiflora Salisb. var. canthariformis (Lodd.) Bolus, endemic
  - Erica glomiflora Salisb. var. glomiflora, endemic
- Erica glumiflora Klotzsch ex Benth. endemic
  - Erica glutinosa P.J.Bergius, indigenous
  - Erica glutinosa P.J.Bergius var. glutinosa, endemic
  - Erica glutinosa P.J.Bergius var. parviflora Benth. endemic
- Erica gnaphaloides L. endemic
- Erica goatcheriana L.Bolus, indigenous
  - Erica goatcheriana L.Bolus var. drakensteinensis L.Bolus, endemic
  - Erica goatcheriana L.Bolus var. goatcheriana, endemic
  - Erica goatcheriana L.Bolus var. petrensis L.Bolus, endemic
- Erica gossypioides E.G.H.Oliv. endemic
- Erica gracilipes Guthrie & Bolus, endemic
- Erica gracilis J.C.Wendl. endemic
- Erica grandiflora L.f. accepted as Erica abietina L. subsp. aurantiaca E.G.H.Oliv. & I.M.Oliv. present
  - Erica grandiflora L.f. var. exsurgens (Andrews) E.G.H.Oliv. accepted as Erica abietina L. subsp. aurantiaca E.G.H.Oliv. & I.M.Oliv. present
- Erica granulatifolia H.A.Baker, endemic
- Erica granulosa H.A.Baker, endemic
- Erica grata Guthrie & Bolus, endemic
- Erica greyi Guthrie & Bolus, endemic
- Erica grisbrookii Guthrie & Bolus, endemic
- Erica guthriei Bolus, indigenous
  - Erica guthriei Bolus var. guthriei, endemic
  - Erica guthriei Bolus var. strictior Bolus, endemic
- Erica gysbertii Guthrie & Bolus, indigenous
  - Erica gysbertii Guthrie & Bolus var. ampliata L.Bolus, endemic
  - Erica gysbertii Guthrie & Bolus var. gysbertii, endemic
  - Erica gysbertii Guthrie & Bolus var. longiflora L.Bolus, endemic
- Erica haemastoma J.C.Wendl. endemic
- Erica haematocodon T.M.Salter, endemic
- Erica haematosiphon Guthrie & Bolus, endemic
- Erica halicacaba L. endemic
- Erica hameriana L.Bolus, endemic
- Erica hanekomii E.G.H.Oliv. endemic
- Erica hansfordii E.G.H.Oliv. endemic
- Erica harveyana Guthrie & Bolus, endemic
- Erica hebdomadalis E.G.H.Oliv. & I.M.Oliv. endemic
- Erica hebecalyx Benth. accepted as Erica discolor Andrews, endemic
- Erica heleogena T.M.Salter, endemic
- Erica heleophila Guthrie & Bolus, endemic
- Erica hendricksei H.A.Baker, indigenous
  - Erica hendricksei H.A.Baker var. alba H.A.Baker, endemic
  - Erica hendricksei H.A.Baker var. hendricksei, endemic
- Erica hermani E.G.H.Oliv. endemic
- Erica heterophylla Guthrie & Bolus, endemic
- Erica hexensis E.G.H.Oliv. endemic
- Erica hibbertii Andrews, indigenous
- Erica hillburttii (E.G.H.Oliv.) E.G.H.Oliv. endemic
- Erica hippurus Compton, endemic
- Erica hirta Thunb. endemic
- Erica hirtiflora Curtis, indigenous
  - Erica hirtiflora Curtis var. hirtiflora, endemic
  - Erica hirtiflora Curtis var. minor (Andrews) Benth. endemic
- Erica hispidula L. indigenous
  - Erica hispidula L. var. hispidula, endemic
  - Erica hispidula L. var. micrantha Benth. endemic
  - Erica hispidula L. var. serpyllifolia (Andrews) Benth. endemic
  - Erica hispidula L. var. viscidula (L.Bolus) Dulfer, endemic
- Erica hispiduloides E.G.H.Oliv. endemic
- Erica holosericea Salisb. indigenous
  - Erica holosericea Salisb. var. holosericea, endemic
  - Erica holosericea Salisb. var. parviflora Bolus, endemic
- Erica holtii Schweick. indigenous
- Erica hottentotica E.G.H.Oliv. endemic
- Erica humansdorpensis Compton, endemic
- Erica humidicola E.G.H.Oliv. endemic
- Erica humifusa Hibberd ex Salisb. endemic
- Erica ignita E.G.H.Oliv. endemic
- Erica imbricata L. endemic
- Erica inaequalis (N.E.Br.) E.G.H.Oliv. endemic
- Erica inamoena Dulfer, endemic
- Erica incarnata Thunb. endemic
- Erica inclusa H.L.Wendl. ex Benth. endemic
- Erica inconstans Zahlbr. endemic
- Erica inflata Thunb. endemic
- Erica inflaticalyx E.G.H.Oliv. endemic
- Erica infundibuliformis Andrews, endemic
- Erica ingeana E.G.H.Oliv. endemic
- Erica innovans E.G.H.Oliv. endemic
- Erica inops Bolus, accepted as Erica hispidula L. var. hispidula, present
- Erica inordinata H.A.Baker, endemic
- Erica insignis E.G.H.Oliv. endemic
- Erica insolitanthera H.A.Baker, endemic
- Erica intermedia Klotzsch ex Benth. indigenous
  - Erica intermedia Klotzsch ex Benth. subsp. albiflora E.G.H.Oliv. & I.M.Oliv. endemic
  - Erica intermedia Klotzsch ex Benth. subsp. intermedia, endemic
- Erica interrupta (N.E.Br.) E.G.H.Oliv. endemic
- Erica intervallaris Salisb. indigenous
  - Erica intervallaris Salisb. var. breviflora Dulfer, accepted as Erica duthieae L.Bolus, present
  - Erica intervallaris Salisb. var. grandiflora Bolus, endemic
  - Erica intervallaris Salisb. var. intervallaris, endemic
  - Erica intervallaris Salisb. var. trifolia H.A.Baker, endemic
- Erica intonsa L.Bolus, endemic
- Erica intricata H.A.Baker, endemic
- Erica involucrata Klotzsch ex Benth. endemic
- Erica involvens Benth. endemic
- Erica ioniana E.G.H.Oliv. endemic
- Erica irbyana Andrews, endemic
- Erica irregularis Benth. endemic
- Erica irrorata Guthrie & Bolus, endemic
- Erica ixanthera Benth. endemic
- Erica jacksoniana H.A.Baker, endemic
- Erica jananthus E.G.H.Oliv. & I.M.Oliv. endemic
- Erica jasminiflora Salisb. endemic
- Erica jeppei L.Bolus, accepted as Erica harveyana Guthrie & Bolus, present
- Erica jonasiana E.G.H.Oliv. endemic
- Erica jugicola E.G.H.Oliv. & I.M.Oliv. endemic
- Erica juniperina E.G.H.Oliv. endemic
- Erica junonia Bolus, indigenous
  - Erica junonia Bolus var. junonia, endemic
  - Erica junonia Bolus var. minor Bolus, endemic
- Erica kammanassieae E.G.H.Oliv. endemic
- Erica karooica E.G.H.Oliv. endemic
- Erica karwyderi E.G.H.Oliv. endemic
- Erica keeromsbergensis H.A.Baker, endemic
- Erica keetii L.Bolus, endemic
- Erica kirstenii E.G.H.Oliv. endemic
- Erica klotzschii (Alm & T.C.E.Fr.) E.G.H.Oliv. endemic
- Erica kogelbergensis E.G.H.Oliv. endemic
- Erica kougabergensis H.A.Baker, indigenous
  - Erica kougabergensis H.A.Baker var. kougabergensis, endemic
  - Erica kougabergensis H.A.Baker var. recurvifolia H.A.Baker, endemic
- Erica kraussiana Klotzsch, endemic
- Erica krugeri E.G.H.Oliv. endemic
- Erica labialis Salisb. endemic
- Erica lachnaeifolia Salisb. endemic
- Erica laeta Bartl. endemic
- Erica laevigata Bartl. indigenous
  - Erica laevigata Bartl. var. elongata Bolus, endemic
  - Erica laevigata Bartl. var. laevigata, endemic
- Erica lageniformis Salisb. endemic
- Erica lananthera L.Bolus, endemic
- Erica lanata Andrews, endemic
- Erica langebergensis H.A.Baker, endemic
- Erica lanipes Guthrie & Bolus, endemic
- Erica lanuginosa Andrews, endemic
- Erica lasciva Salisb. endemic
- Erica lasiocarpa Guthrie & Bolus, endemic
- Erica lateralis Willd. endemic
- Erica lateriflora E.G.H.Oliv. endemic
- Erica latiflora L.Bolus, endemic
- Erica latifolia Andrews, endemic
- Erica latituba L.Bolus, endemic
- Erica lavandulifolia Salisb. endemic
- Erica lawsonii Andrews, endemic
- Erica lehmannii Klotzsch ex Benth. endemic
- Erica lepidota Rach, endemic
- Erica leptantha Dulfer, endemic
- Erica leptoclada Van Heurck & Mull.Arg. indigenous
  - Erica leptoclada Van Heurck & Mull.Arg. var. aristata Bolus, endemic
  - Erica leptoclada Van Heurck & Mull.Arg. var. leptoclada, endemic
- Erica leptopus Benth. indigenous
  - Erica leptopus Benth. var. breviloba Bolus, endemic
  - Erica leptopus Benth. var. leptopus, endemic
  - Erica leptopus Benth. var. piquetbergensis Bolus, endemic
- Erica leptostachya Guthrie & Bolus, accepted as Erica scoparia L. subsp. scoparia, present
  - Erica leptostachya Guthrie & Bolus var. glabra Dulfer, accepted as Erica natalitia Bolus var. natalitia, present
- Erica lerouxiae Bolus, endemic
- Erica leucantha Link, endemic
- Erica leucanthera L.f. endemic
- Erica leucodesmia Benth. endemic
- Erica leucopelta Tausch, indigenous
  - Erica leucopelta Tausch var. ephebioides Bolus, endemic
  - Erica leucopelta Tausch var. leucopelta, indigenous
  - Erica leucopelta Tausch var. luxurians I.Verd. indigenous
  - Erica leucopelta Tausch var. pubescens Bolus, endemic
- Erica leucosiphon L.Bolus, endemic
- Erica leucotrachela H.A.Baker, indigenous
  - Erica leucotrachela H.A.Baker subsp. leucotrachela, endemic
  - Erica leucotrachela H.A.Baker subsp. monicae E.G.H.Oliv. & I.M.Oliv. endemic
- Erica lignosa H.A.Baker, endemic
- Erica limnophila E.G.H.Oliv. indigenous
- Erica limosa L.Bolus, endemic
- Erica lineata Benth. accepted as Erica plukenetii L. subsp. lineata (Benth.) E.G.H.Oliv. & I.M.Oliv. present
- Erica lithophila E.G.H.Oliv. & I.M.Oliv. endemic
- Erica loganii Compton, endemic
- Erica longiaristata Benth. endemic
- Erica longifolia F.A.Bauer, accepted as Erica viscaria L. subsp. longifolia (F.A.Bauer) E.G.H.Oliv. & I.M.Oliv. present
  - Erica longifolia F.A.Bauer subsp. gallorum (Andrews) E.G.H.Oliv. & I.M.Oliv. accepted as Erica viscaria L. subsp. gallorum (L.Bolus) E.G.H.Oliv. & I.M.Oliv. present
  - Erica longifolia F.A.Bauer subsp. macrosepala (Andrews) E.G.H.Oliv. & I.M.Oliv. accepted as Erica viscaria L. subsp. macrosepala E.G.H.Oliv. & I.M.Oliv.
  - Erica longifolia F.A.Bauer subsp. pendula E.G.H.Oliv. & I.M.Oliv. accepted as Erica viscaria L. subsp. pendula E.G.H.Oliv. & I.M.Oliv. present
  - Erica longifolia F.A.Bauer subsp. pustulata (H.A.Baker) E.G.H.Oliv. & I.M.Oliv. accepted as Erica viscaria L. subsp. pustulata (H.A.Baker) E.G.H.Oliv. & I.M.Oliv. present
  - Erica longifolia F.A.Bauer var. amplicata Bolus, accepted as Erica vestita Thunb. present
  - Erica longifolia F.A.Bauer var. breviflora Dulfer, accepted as Erica viscaria L. subsp. pustulata (H.A.Baker) E.G.H.Oliv. & I.M.Oliv. present
  - Erica longifolia F.A.Bauer var. contracta Bolus, accepted as Erica longifolia F.A.Bauer subsp. longifolia, present
  - Erica longifolia F.A.Bauer var. maritima Bolus, accepted as Erica vestita Thunb. present
  - Erica longifolia F.A.Bauer var. squarrosa Bolus, accepted as Erica longifolia F.A.Bauer subsp. longifolia, present
  - Erica longifolia F.A.Bauer var. stricta Dulfer, accepted as Erica longifolia F.A.Bauer subsp. longifolia, present
  - Erica longifolia F.A.Bauer var. viridis (Andrews) Bolus, accepted as Erica viscaria L. subsp. macrosepala E.G.H.Oliv. & I.M.Oliv. present
- Erica longimontana E.G.H.Oliv. endemic
- Erica longipedunculata Lodd. indigenous
  - Erica longipedunculata Lodd. var. intermedia (Bolus) Dulfer, endemic
  - Erica longipedunculata Lodd. var. longipedunculata, endemic
  - Erica longipedunculata Lodd. var. setifera (Bolus) Dulfer, endemic
- Erica longistyla L.Bolus, indigenous
  - Erica longistyla L.Bolus var. appressa Dulfer, endemic
  - Erica longistyla L.Bolus var. longistyla, endemic
- Erica lowryensis Bolus, indigenous
  - Erica lowryensis Bolus var. glandulifera Dulfer, endemic
  - Erica lowryensis Bolus var. lowryensis, endemic
- Erica lucida Salisb. indigenous
  - Erica lucida Salisb. var. laxa (Andrews) Bolus, endemic
  - Erica lucida Salisb. var. lucida, endemic
  - Erica lucida Salisb. var. pauciflora Bolus, endemic
- Erica lutea P.J.Bergius, endemic
- Erica lycopodiastrum Lam. endemic
- Erica macilenta Guthrie & Bolus, endemic
- Erica macowanii Cufino, indigenous
  - Erica macowanii Cufino subsp. lanceolata (Bolus) E.G.H.Oliv. & I.M.Oliv. endemic
  - Erica macowanii Cufino subsp. macowanii, endemic
- Erica macroloma Benth. endemic
- Erica macrophylla Klotzsch ex Benth. endemic
- Erica macrotrema Guthrie & Bolus, indigenous
  - Erica macrotrema Guthrie & Bolus var. glabripedicellata Dulfer, endemic
  - Erica macrotrema Guthrie & Bolus var. macrotrema, endemic
- Erica maderi Guthrie & Bolus, endemic
- Erica madida E.G.H.Oliv. endemic
- Erica maesta Bolus, indigenous
  - Erica maesta Bolus var. longistyla Dulfer, endemic
  - Erica maesta Bolus var. maesta, indigenous
- Erica magistrati E.G.H.Oliv. endemic
- Erica magnisylvae E.G.H.Oliv. endemic
- Erica malmesburiensis E.G.H.Oliv. endemic
- Erica mammosa L. endemic
- Erica manifesta Compton, accepted as Erica umbelliflora Klotzsch ex Benth. indigenous
  - Erica manifesta Compton var. campanulata Dulfer, accepted as Erica umbelliflora Klotzsch ex Benth. present
- Erica margaritacea Sol. endemic
- Erica mariae Guthrie & Bolus, accepted as Erica regia Bartl. subsp. mariae (Guthrie & Bolus) E.G.H.Oliv. & I.M.Oliv. present
- Erica marifolia Sol. endemic
- Erica maritima Guthrie & Bolus, endemic
- Erica marlothii Bolus, endemic
- Erica massonii L.f. indigenous
  - Erica massonii L.f. var. massonii, endemic
  - Erica massonii L.f. var. minor Benth. endemic
- Erica mauritanica L. endemic
- Erica maximiliani Guthrie & Bolus, endemic
- Erica media Klotzsch ex Benth. accepted as Erica umbelliflora Klotzsch ex Benth. present
- Erica melanacme Guthrie & Bolus, endemic
- Erica melanomontana E.G.H.Oliv. indigenous
- Erica melanthera L. endemic
- Erica melastoma Andrews, indigenous
  - Erica melastoma Andrews subsp. melastoma, endemic
  - Erica melastoma Andrews subsp. minor E.G.H.Oliv. & I.M.Oliv. endemic
- Erica merxmuelleri Dulfer, accepted as Erica natalitia Bolus var. natalitia, present
- Erica micrandra Guthrie & Bolus, endemic
- Erica microcodon Guthrie & Bolus, accepted as Erica mundii Guthrie & Bolus, present
- Erica miniscula E.G.H.Oliv. endemic
- Erica minutissima Klotzsch ex Benth. accepted as Erica quadrangularis Salisb. present
- Erica mira Klotzsch ex Benth. endemic
- Erica mitchellensis Dulfer, endemic
- Erica modesta Salisb. endemic
- Erica mollis Andrews, endemic
- Erica monadelphia Andrews, endemic
- Erica monantha Compton, endemic
- Erica monsoniana L.f. indigenous
  - Erica monsoniana L.f. var. exserta Klotzsch, endemic
  - Erica monsoniana L.f. var. monsoniana, endemic
- Erica montis-hominis E.G.H.Oliv. endemic
- Erica mucronata Andrews, endemic
- Erica muirii L.Bolus, endemic
- Erica multiflexuosa E.G.H.Oliv. endemic
- Erica multumbellifera P.J.Bergius, endemic
- Erica mundii Guthrie & Bolus, endemic
- Erica muscosa (Aiton) E.G.H.Oliv. endemic
- Erica myriocodon Guthrie & Bolus, endemic
- Erica nabea Guthrie & Bolus, endemic
- Erica nana Salisb. endemic
- Erica natalensis Dulfer, endemic
- Erica natalitia Bolus, indigenous
  - Erica natalitia Bolus var. brevipedicellata Dulfer, accepted as Erica binaria E.G.H.Oliv. present
  - Erica natalitia Bolus var. natalitia, indigenous
  - Erica natalitia Bolus var. robusta Dulfer, endemic
- Erica navigatoris E.G.H.Oliv. endemic
- Erica nematophylla Guthrie & Bolus, endemic
- Erica nemorosa Klotzsch ex Benth. endemic
- Erica nervata Guthrie & Bolus, endemic
- Erica nevillei L.Bolus, endemic
- Erica newdigateae Dulfer, endemic
- Erica nidularia Lodd. indigenous
- Erica nigrimontana Guthrie & Bolus, endemic
- Erica nivea Sinclair, endemic
- Erica niveniana E.G.H.Oliv. endemic
- Erica notholeeana (E.G.H.Oliv.) E.G.H.Oliv. endemic
- Erica nubigena Bolus, endemic
- Erica nudiflora L. endemic
- Erica nutans J.C.Wendl. endemic
- Erica oakesiorum E.G.H.Oliv. endemic
- Erica oatesii Rolfe, indigenous
  - Erica oatesii Rolfe var. latifolia Bolus, endemic
  - Erica oatesii Rolfe var. oatesii, indigenous
- Erica obconica H.A.Baker, endemic
- Erica obliqua Thunb. endemic
- Erica oblongiflora Benth. endemic
- Erica obtusata Klotzsch ex Benth. endemic
- Erica occulta E.G.H.Oliv. endemic
- Erica ocellata Guthrie & Bolus, endemic
- Erica octonaria L.Bolus, endemic
- Erica odorata Andrews, endemic
- Erica oligantha Guthrie & Bolus, endemic
- Erica oliveri H.A.Baker, endemic
- Erica omninoglabra H.A.Baker, endemic
- Erica onosmiflora Salisb. accepted as Erica viscaria L. subsp. macrosepala E.G.H.Oliv. & I.M.Oliv. present
- Erica onusta Guthrie & Bolus, endemic
- Erica oophylla Benth. endemic
- Erica opulenta (J.C.Wendl. ex Klotzsch) Benth. endemic
- Erica orculiflora Dulfer, endemic
- Erica oreina Dulfer, accepted as Erica lateralis Willd. present
- Erica oreophila Guthrie & Bolus, endemic
- Erica oreotragus E.G.H.Oliv. endemic
- Erica oresigena Bolus, endemic
  - Erica oresigena Bolus var. intermedia Bolus, accepted as Erica oresigena Bolus, present
  - Erica oresigena Bolus var. mollipila Bolus, accepted as Erica taylorii E.G.H.Oliv. present
- Erica orientalis R.A.Dyer, endemic
- Erica orthiocola E.G.H.Oliv. endemic
- Erica ostiaria Compton, endemic
- Erica outeniquae (Compton) E.G.H.Oliv. endemic
- Erica ovina Klotzsch, indigenous
  - Erica ovina Klotzsch var. ovina, endemic
  - Erica ovina Klotzsch var. purpurea Bolus, endemic
- Erica oxyandra Guthrie & Bolus, endemic
- Erica oxycoccifolia Salisb. endemic
- Erica oxysepala Guthrie & Bolus, endemic
- Erica pageana L.Bolus, endemic
- Erica palliiflora Salisb. endemic
- Erica paludicola L.Bolus, endemic
- Erica paniculata L. endemic
- Erica pannosa Salisb. indigenous
- Erica papyracea Guthrie & Bolus, endemic
- Erica parilis Salisb. indigenous
  - Erica parilis Salisb. var. parilis, endemic
  - Erica parilis Salisb. var. parviflora Benth. endemic
- Erica parviflora L. indigenous
  - Erica parviflora L. var. exigua (Salisb.) Bolus, endemic
  - Erica parviflora L. var. glabra Compton, endemic
  - Erica parviflora L. var. hispida Bolus, endemic
  - Erica parviflora L. var. inermis (Klotzsch) Bolus, endemic
  - Erica parviflora L. var. parviflora, endemic
  - Erica parviflora L. var. puberula (Bartl.) Bolus, endemic
  - Erica parviflora L. var. ternifolia Bolus, endemic
- Erica parviporandra E.G.H.Oliv. endemic
- Erica parvula Guthrie & Bolus, accepted as Erica equisetifolia Salisb. present
- Erica parvulisepala H.A.Baker, accepted as Erica xanthina Guthrie & Bolus, present
- Erica passerinae Montin, endemic
- Erica passerinoides (Bolus) E.G.H.Oliv. endemic
- Erica patersonia Andrews, endemic
  - Erica patersonii L.Bolus, accepted as Erica viscaria L. subsp. pustulata (H.A.Baker) E.G.H.Oliv. & I.M.Oliv. present
- Erica paucifolia (J.C.Wendl.) E.G.H.Oliv. indigenous
  - Erica paucifolia (J.C.Wendl.) E.G.H.Oliv. subsp. ciliata (Klotzsch) E.G.H.Oliv. endemic
  - Erica paucifolia (J.C.Wendl.) E.G.H.Oliv. subsp. paucifolia, endemic
  - Erica paucifolia (J.C.Wendl.) E.G.H.Oliv. subsp. squarrosa (Benth.) E.G.H.Oliv. endemic
- Erica pauciovulata H.A.Baker, endemic
- Erica pearsoniana L.Bolus, endemic
- Erica pectinifolia Salisb. indigenous
  - Erica pectinifolia Salisb. var. oblongifolia Dulfer, endemic
  - Erica pectinifolia Salisb. var. pectinifolia, endemic
- Erica pellucida Sol. ex Salisb. endemic
- Erica peltata Andrews, endemic
- Erica penduliflora E.G.H.Oliv. endemic
- Erica penicilliformis Salisb. indigenous
  - Erica penicilliformis Salisb. var. chrysantha (Klotzsch ex Benth.) Dulfer, endemic
  - Erica penicilliformis Salisb. var. penicilliformis, endemic
- Erica perlata Sinclair, endemic
- Erica permutata Dulfer, endemic
- Erica perplexa E.G.H.Oliv. endemic
- Erica perspicua J.C.Wendl. indigenous
  - Erica perspicua J.C.Wendl. subsp. latifolia (Benth.) E.G.H.Oliv. & I.M.Oliv. endemic
  - Erica perspicua J.C.Wendl. subsp. perspicua, endemic
  - Erica perspicua J.C.Wendl. var. lanceolata Bolus, accepted as Erica macowanii Cufino subsp. lanceolata (Bolus) E.G.H.Oliv. & I.M.Oliv. endemic
  - Erica perspicua J.C.Wendl. var. latifolia Bolus, accepted as Erica perspicua J.C.Wendl. subsp. latifolia (Benth.) E.G.H.Oliv. & I.M.Oliv. endemic
- Erica petiolaris Lam. endemic
- Erica petraea Benth. endemic
- Erica petricola E.G.H.Oliv. endemic
- Erica petrophila L.Bolus, endemic
- Erica petrusiana E.G.H.Oliv. & I.M.Oliv. endemic
- Erica peziza Lodd. endemic
- Erica phacelanthera E.G.H.Oliv. endemic
- Erica phaeocarpa (N.E.Br.) E.G.H.Oliv. endemic
- Erica philippioides Compton, endemic
- Erica phillipsii L.Bolus, endemic
- Erica phylicifolia Salisb. accepted as Erica abietina L. subsp. atrorosea E.G.H.Oliv. & I.M.Oliv. present
- Erica physantha Benth. endemic
- Erica physodes L. endemic
- Erica physophylla Benth. endemic
- Erica pilaarkopensis H.A.Baker, endemic
- Erica pillansii Bolus, indigenous
  - Erica pillansii Bolus subsp. fervida (L.Bolus) E.G.H.Oliv. & I.M.Oliv. endemic
  - Erica pillansii Bolus subsp. pillansii, endemic
- Erica pilosiflora E.G.H.Oliv. indigenous
  - Erica pilosiflora E.G.H.Oliv. subsp. pilosiflora, endemic
  - Erica pilosiflora E.G.H.Oliv. subsp. purpurea E.G.H.Oliv. endemic
- Erica pilulifera L. endemic
- Erica pinea Thunb. endemic
  - Erica pinea Thunb. var. argentiflora (Andrews) Bolus, accepted as Erica pinea Thunb. present
  - Erica pinea Thunb. var. viscosissima (Benth.) Bolus, accepted as Erica pinea Thunb. present
- Erica piquetbergensis (N.E.Br.) E.G.H.Oliv. endemic
- Erica placentiflora Salisb. endemic
- Erica planifolia L. indigenous
  - Erica planifolia L. var. calycina Bolus, endemic
  - Erica planifolia L. var. planifolia, endemic
- Erica platycalyx E.G.H.Oliv. endemic
- Erica plena L.Bolus, endemic
- Erica plukenetii L. indigenous
  - Erica plukenetii L. subsp. bredensis E.G.H.Oliv. & I.M.Oliv. endemic
  - Erica plukenetii L. subsp. breviflora (Dulfer) E.G.H.Oliv. & I.M.Oliv. endemic
  - Erica plukenetii L. subsp. lineata (Benth.) E.G.H.Oliv. & I.M.Oliv. endemic
  - Erica plukenetii L. subsp. penicellata (Andrews) E.G.H.Oliv. & I.M.Oliv. endemic
  - Erica plukenetii L. subsp. plukenetii, endemic
  - Erica plukenetii L. var. bicarinata Bolus, accepted as Erica plukenetii L. subsp. penicellata (Andrews) E.G.H.Oliv. & I.M.Oliv. present
  - Erica plukenetii L. var. brevifolia Bolus, accepted as Erica plukenetii L. subsp. plukenetii, present
- Erica plumigera Bartl. endemic
- Erica plumosa Thunb. endemic
- Erica podophylla Benth. endemic
- Erica pogonanthera Bartl. endemic
- Erica polifolia Salisb. ex Benth. indigenous
  - Erica polifolia Salisb. ex Benth. var. angustata Bolus, endemic
  - Erica polifolia Salisb. ex Benth. var. polifolia, endemic
- Erica polycoma Benth. endemic
- Erica portenschlagiana Dulfer, endemic
- Erica porteri Compton, accepted as Erica thomae L.Bolus, present
- Erica praecox Klotzsch, endemic
- Erica praenitens Tausch, endemic
- Erica primulina Bolus, accepted as Erica viridiflora Andrews subsp. primulina (Bolus) E.G.H.Oliv. & I.M.Oliv. present
- Erica priorii Guthrie & Bolus, endemic
- Erica procaviana (E.G.H.Oliv.) E.G.H.Oliv. endemic
- Erica prolata E.G.H.Oliv. & I.M.Oliv. endemic
- Erica propendens Andrews, endemic
- Erica propinqua Guthrie & Bolus, endemic
- Erica pseudocalycina Compton, endemic
- Erica psittacina E.G.H.Oliv. & I.M.Oliv. indigenous
- Erica puberuliflora E.G.H.Oliv. endemic
- Erica pubescens L. indigenous
  - Erica pubescens L. var. glabrifolia Dulfer, endemic
  - Erica pubescens L. var. pubescens, endemic
- Erica pubigera Salisb. endemic
- Erica pudens H.A.Baker, endemic
- Erica pulchella Houtt. indigenous
  - Erica pulchella Houtt. var. major T.M.Salter, endemic
  - Erica pulchella Houtt. var. pulchella, endemic
- Erica pulchelliflora E.G.H.Oliv. endemic
- Erica pulvinata Guthrie & Bolus, endemic
- Erica pumila Andrews, endemic
- Erica purgatoriensis H.A.Baker, endemic
- Erica pustulata H.A.Baker, accepted as Erica viscaria L. subsp. pustulata (H.A.Baker) E.G.H.Oliv. & I.M.Oliv. present
- Erica pycnantha Benth. endemic
- Erica pyramidalis Sol. indigenous
  - Erica pyramidalis Sol. var. pyramidalis, endemic
  - Erica pyramidalis Sol. var. vernalis (Lodd.) Benth. endemic
- Erica pyrantha L.Bolus, accepted as Erica pillansii Bolus subsp. fervida (L.Bolus) E.G.H.Oliv. & I.M.Oliv. present
- Erica pyxidiflora Salisb. endemic
- Erica quadrangularis Salisb. endemic
- Erica quadrifida (Benth.) E.G.H.Oliv. endemic
- Erica quadrisulcata L.Bolus, endemic
- Erica racemosa Thunb. indigenous
  - Erica racemosa Thunb. var. aristata L.Bolus, endemic
  - Erica racemosa Thunb. var. racemosa, endemic
- Erica radicans (L.Guthrie) E.G.H.Oliv. indigenous
  - Erica radicans (L.Guthrie) E.G.H.Oliv. subsp. radicans, endemic
  - Erica radicans (L.Guthrie) E.G.H.Oliv. subsp. schlechteri (N.E.Br.) E.G.H.Oliv. endemic
- Erica recta Bolus, endemic
- Erica recurvata Andrews, accepted as Erica cumuliflora Salisb. present
- Erica recurvifolia E.G.H.Oliv. endemic
- Erica reenensis Zahlbr. indigenous
- Erica regerminans L. endemic
- Erica regia Bartl. indigenous
  - Erica regia Bartl. subsp. mariae (Guthrie & Bolus) E.G.H.Oliv. & I.M.Oliv. endemic
  - Erica regia Bartl. subsp. regia, endemic
  - Erica regia Bartl. var. variegata Bolus, accepted as Erica regia Bartl. subsp. regia, present
  - Erica regia Bartl. var. williana Bolus, accepted as Erica regia Bartl. subsp. regia, present
- Erica rehmii Dulfer, endemic
- Erica remota (N.E.Br.) E.G.H.Oliv. endemic
- Erica retorta Montin, endemic
- Erica revoluta (Bolus) L.E.Davidson, indigenous
- Erica rhodantha Guthrie & Bolus, endemic
- Erica rhodopis (Bolus) Guthrie & Bolus, endemic
- Erica rhopalantha Dulfer, indigenous
  - Erica rhopalantha Dulfer var. delapsa (Bolus) Dulfer, endemic
  - Erica rhopalantha Dulfer var. rhopalantha, endemic
- Erica ribisaria Guthrie & Bolus, endemic
- Erica richardii E.G.H.Oliv. & I.M.Oliv. endemic
- Erica rigidula (N.E.Br.) E.G.H.Oliv. endemic
- Erica rimarum E.G.H.Oliv. endemic
- Erica riparia H.A.Baker, endemic
- Erica rivularis L.E.Davidson, endemic
- Erica rosacea (L.Guthrie) E.G.H.Oliv. indigenous
  - Erica rosacea (L.Guthrie) E.G.H.Oliv. subsp. glabrata E.G.H.Oliv. endemic
  - Erica rosacea (L.Guthrie) E.G.H.Oliv. subsp. rosacea, endemic
- Erica roseoloba E.G.H.Oliv. endemic
- Erica rubens Thunb. endemic
- Erica rubiginosa Dulfer, indigenous
  - Erica rubiginosa Dulfer var. caespitosa (Bolus) Dulfer, endemic
  - Erica rubiginosa Dulfer var. rubiginosa, endemic
- Erica rudolfii Bolus, endemic
- Erica rufescens Klotzsch, endemic
- Erica rugata E.G.H.Oliv. endemic
- Erica rupicola Klotzsch, endemic
- Erica russakiana E.G.H.Oliv. endemic
- Erica rusticula E.G.H.Oliv. endemic
- Erica sacciflora Salisb. endemic
- Erica sagittata Klotzsch ex Benth. endemic
- Erica salax Salisb. endemic
- Erica salicina E.G.H.Oliv. endemic
- Erica salteri L.Bolus, endemic
- Erica saptouensis E.G.H.Oliv. endemic
- Erica savileae Andrews, indigenous
  - Erica savileae Andrews var. grandiflora Bolus, endemic
  - Erica savileae Andrews var. mutica L.Bolus, endemic
  - Erica savileae Andrews var. savileae, endemic
- Erica saxicola Guthrie & Bolus, endemic
- Erica saxigena Dulfer, endemic
- Erica scabriuscula Lodd. endemic
- Erica schelpeorum E.G.H.Oliv. & I.M.Oliv. endemic
- Erica schlechteri Bolus, indigenous
- Erica schumannii E.G.H.Oliv. indigenous
- Erica scytophylla Guthrie & Bolus, endemic
- Erica selaginifolia Salisb. endemic
- Erica senilis Klotzsch ex Benth. endemic
  - Erica senilis Klotzsch ex Benth. var. australis Dulfer, accepted as Erica tegetiformis E.G.H.Oliv. present
- Erica seriphiifolia Salisb. endemic
- Erica serrata Thunb. endemic
- Erica serratifolia Andrews var. subnuda L.Bolus, accepted as Erica kogelbergensis E.G.H.Oliv. present
- Erica sessiliflora L.f. endemic
  - Erica sessiliflora L.f. var. clavaeflora (Salisb.) Bolus, accepted as Erica sessiliflora L.f. present
  - Erica sessiliflora L.f. var. oblanceolata Bolus, accepted as Erica sessiliflora L.f. present
  - Erica sessiliflora L.f. var. sceptriformis (Salisb.) Bolus, accepted as Erica sessiliflora L.f. present
- Erica setacea Andrews, endemic
- Erica setociliata H.A.Baker, endemic
- Erica setosa Bartl. endemic
- Erica setulosa Benth. endemic
- Erica sexfaria Aiton, endemic
- Erica shannonii Andrews, endemic
- Erica sicifolia Salisb. endemic
- Erica simii (S.Moore) E.G.H.Oliv. indigenous
- Erica similis (N.E.Br.) E.G.H.Oliv. endemic
- Erica simulans Dulfer, indigenous
  - Erica simulans Dulfer var. simulans, endemic
  - Erica simulans Dulfer var. tetragona (Bolus) Dulfer, endemic
  - Erica simulans Dulfer var. trivialis (Klotzsch) Dulfer, endemic
- Erica sitiens Klotzsch, endemic
- Erica sociorum L.Bolus, endemic
- Erica solandra Andrews var. mollis Dulfer, accepted as Erica setulosa Benth. present
- Erica solandri Andrews, endemic
- Erica sonderiana Guthrie & Bolus, endemic
- Erica sonora Compton, accepted as Erica aristifolia Benth. present
- Erica sparrmanni L.f., endemic
- Erica sparsa Lodd. indigenous
  - Erica sparsa Lodd. var. glanduloso-pedicellata Dulfer, endemic
  - Erica sparsa Lodd. var. sparsa, endemic
- Erica speciosa Andrews, accepted as Erica discolor Andrews, present
- Erica spectabilis Klotzsch ex Benth. endemic
- Erica sperata E.G.H.Oliv. endemic
- Erica sphaerocephala J.C.Wendl. ex Benth. endemic
- Erica sphaeroidea Dulfer, accepted as Erica hirta Thunb. indigenous
  - Erica sphaeroidea Dulfer var. subterminalis (Klotzsch) Dulfer, accepted as Erica hirta Thunb. present
- Erica spumosa L. endemic
- Erica squarrosa Salisb. endemic
- Erica stagnalis Salisb. endemic
  - Erica stagnalis Salisb. subsp. minor E.G.H.Oliv. & I.M.Oliv. endemic
  - Erica stagnalis Salisb. subsp. stagnalis, endemic
- Erica steinbergiana H.L.Wendl. ex Klotzsch, indigenous
  - Erica steinbergiana H.L.Wendl. ex Klotzsch var. abbreviata Bolus, endemic
  - Erica steinbergiana H.L.Wendl. ex Klotzsch var. steinbergiana, endemic
- Erica stenantha Klotzsch ex Benth. endemic
- Erica stokoeanthus E.G.H.Oliv. endemic
- Erica stokoei L.Bolus, endemic
- Erica straussiana Gilg, indigenous
- Erica strigilifolia Salisb. indigenous
  - Erica strigilifolia Salisb. var. rosea Bolus, endemic
  - Erica strigilifolia Salisb. var. strigilifolia, endemic
- Erica strigosa Sol. endemic
- Erica stylaris Spreng. endemic
- Erica subcapitata (N.E.Br.) E.G.H.Oliv. endemic
- Erica subdivaricata P.J.Bergius, endemic
- Erica subimbricata Compton, accepted as Erica imbricata L. present
- Erica subulata J.C.Wendl. endemic
- Erica subverticillaris Diels ex Guthrie & Bolus, endemic
- Erica suffulta J.C.Wendl. ex Benth. endemic
- Erica symonsii L.Bolus, accepted as Erica straussiana Gilg, present
- Erica syngenesia Compton, endemic
- Erica tarantulae E.G.H.Oliv. indigenous
- Erica taxifolia Aiton, endemic
- Erica taylorii E.G.H.Oliv. endemic
- Erica tegetiformis E.G.H.Oliv. endemic
- Erica tegulifolia Salisb. endemic
- Erica tenax L.Bolus, accepted as Erica thomae L.Bolus, present
- Erica tenella Andrews, indigenous
  - Erica tenella Andrews var. gracilior Bolus, endemic
  - Erica tenella Andrews var. tenella, endemic
- Erica tenuicaulis Klotzsch ex Benth. endemic
- Erica tenuifolia L. endemic
- Erica tenuipes Guthrie & Bolus, endemic
- Erica tenuis Salisb. endemic
- Erica terniflora E.G.H.Oliv. indigenous
- Erica tetragona L.f. endemic
- Erica tetrathecoides Benth. endemic
- Erica thamnoides E.G.H.Oliv. endemic
- Erica thimifolia J.C.Wendl. endemic
- Erica thodei Guthrie & Bolus, indigenous
- Erica thomae L.Bolus, endemic
  - Erica thomae L.Bolus var. brevisepala L.Bolus, accepted as Erica thomae L.Bolus, present
- Erica thunbergii Montin, indigenous
  - Erica thunbergii Montin var. celsiana (Lodd.) Benth. endemic
  - Erica thunbergii Montin var. thunbergii, endemic
- Erica tomentosa Salisb. endemic
- Erica toringbergensis H.A.Baker, endemic
- Erica totta Thunb. endemic
- Erica trachysantha Bolus, endemic
- Erica tradouwensis Compton, endemic
- Erica tragomontana R.C.Turner, endemic
- Erica tragulifera Salisb. endemic
- Erica transparens P.J.Bergius, endemic
- Erica triceps Link, endemic
- Erica trichadenia Bolus, endemic
- Erica trichoclada Guthrie & Bolus, endemic
- Erica trichophora Benth. endemic
- Erica trichophylla Benth. endemic
- Erica trichostigma Salter, endemic
- Erica trichroma Benth. indigenous
  - Erica trichroma Benth. var. imbricata Bolus, endemic
  - Erica trichroma Benth. var. trichroma, endemic
- Erica triflora L. indigenous
  - Erica triflora L. var. rosea Benth. endemic
  - Erica triflora L. var. triflora, endemic
- Erica tristis Bartl. indigenous
- Erica truncata L.Bolus, endemic
- Erica tubercularis Salisb. endemic
- Erica tumida Ker Gawl. indigenous
  - Erica tumida Ker Gawl. var. minor Bolus, endemic
  - Erica tumida Ker Gawl. var. tumida, endemic
- Erica turbiniflora Salisb. accepted as Erica capensis Salter, indigenous
  - Erica turbiniflora Salisb. var. aristata Bolus, accepted as Erica capensis Salter, present
- Erica turgida Salisb. endemic
- Erica turmalis Salisb. indigenous
- Erica turneri E.G.H.Oliv. endemic
- Erica turrisbabylonica H.A.Baker, endemic
- Erica tysonii Bolus, indigenous
  - Erica tysonii Bolus var. krookii Zahlbr. endemic
  - Erica tysonii Bolus var. tysonii, endemic
- Erica uberiflora E.G.H.Oliv. endemic
- Erica umbelliflora Klotzsch ex Benth. endemic
- Erica umbonata Compton, accepted as Erica glandulipila Compton, present
- Erica umbratica E.G.H.Oliv. & I.M.Oliv. endemic
- Erica unicolor J.C.Wendl. endemic
  - Erica unicolor J.C.Wendl. subsp. georgensis E.G.H.Oliv. & I.M.Oliv. endemic
  - Erica unicolor J.C.Wendl. subsp. mutica E.G.H.Oliv. & I.M.Oliv. endemic
  - Erica unicolor J.C.Wendl. subsp. unicolor, endemic
- Erica unilateralis Klotzsch ex Benth. endemic
- Erica urceolata (Klotzsch) E.G.H.Oliv. endemic
- Erica urna-viridis Bolus, endemic
- Erica ustulescens Guthrie & Bolus, endemic
- Erica utriculosa L.Bolus, endemic
- Erica uysii H.A.Baker, endemic
- Erica valida H.A.Baker, endemic
- Erica vallis-aranearum E.G.H.Oliv. endemic
- Erica vallis-fluminis E.G.H.Oliv. endemic
- Erica vallis-gratiae Guthrie & Bolus, endemic
- Erica vanheurckii Mull.Arg. endemic
- Erica varderi L.Bolus, endemic
- Erica velatiflora E.G.H.Oliv. endemic
- Erica velitaris Salisb. indigenous
  - Erica velitaris Salisb. var. hemisphaerica Bolus, endemic
  - Erica velitaris Salisb. var. parvibracteata L.Bolus, endemic
  - Erica velitaris Salisb. var. velitaris, endemic
- Erica ventricosa Thunb. indigenous
  - Erica ventricosa Thunb. var. meyeriana Dulfer, endemic
  - Erica ventricosa Thunb. var. ventricosa, endemic
- Erica venustiflora E.G.H.Oliv. indigenous
  - Erica venustiflora E.G.H.Oliv. subsp. glandulosa E.G.H.Oliv. endemic
  - Erica venustiflora E.G.H.Oliv. subsp. venustiflora, endemic
- Erica verecunda Salisb. endemic
- Erica vernicosa E.G.H.Oliv. endemic
- Erica versicolor Andrews, endemic
  - Erica versicolor Andrews var. ciliata J.C.Wendl. accepted as Erica versicolor Andrews, endemic
  - Erica versicolor Andrews var. longiflora Andrews, accepted as Erica versicolor Andrews, endemic
  - Erica versicolor Andrews var. monticola Bolus, accepted as Erica versicolor Andrews, endemic
- Erica verticillata P.J.Bergius, endemic
- Erica vestiflua Salisb. accepted as Erica melastoma Andrews subsp. melastoma, present
- Erica vestita Thunb. endemic
  - Erica vestita Thunb. var. fulgida Andrews, accepted as Erica vestita Thunb. present
  - Erica villosa J.C.Wendl. endemic
- Erica viminalis E.G.H.Oliv. accepted as Erica salicina E.G.H.Oliv. indigenous
- Erica virginalis Klotzsch ex Benth. endemic
- Erica viridescens Lodd. accepted as Erica unicolor J.C.Wendl. subsp. unicolor, present
  - Erica viridescens Lodd. var. latituba (L.Bolus) Dulfer, accepted as Erica latituba L.Bolus, present
- Erica viridiflora Andrews, indigenous
  - Erica viridiflora Andrews subsp. primulina (Bolus) E.G.H.Oliv. & I.M.Oliv. endemic
  - Erica viridiflora Andrews subsp. redacta E.G.H.Oliv. & I.M.Oliv. endemic
  - Erica viridiflora Andrews subsp. viridiflora, endemic
- Erica viridimontana E.G.H.Oliv. & I.M.Oliv. endemic
  - Erica viridimontana E.G.H.Oliv. & I.M.Oliv. subsp. nivicola E.G.H.Oliv. & I.M.Oliv. endemic
  - Erica viridimontana E.G.H.Oliv. & I.M.Oliv. subsp. viridimontana, endemic
- Erica viscaria L. indigenous
  - Erica viscaria L. subsp. gallorum (L.Bolus) E.G.H.Oliv. & I.M.Oliv. endemic
  - Erica viscaria L. subsp. longifolia (F.A.Bauer) E.G.H.Oliv. & I.M.Oliv. endemic
  - Erica viscaria L. subsp. macrosepala E.G.H.Oliv. & I.M.Oliv. endemic
  - Erica viscaria L. subsp. pendula E.G.H.Oliv. & I.M.Oliv. endemic
  - Erica viscaria L. subsp. pustulata (H.A.Baker) E.G.H.Oliv. & I.M.Oliv. endemic
  - Erica viscaria L. subsp. viscaria, endemic
  - Erica viscaria L. var. decora (Andrews) Bolus, accepted as Erica viscaria L. subsp. viscaria, present
  - Erica viscaria L. var. hispida Bolus, accepted as Erica viscaria L. subsp. gallorum (L.Bolus) E.G.H.Oliv. & I.M.Oliv. present
- Erica viscidiflora Esterh. endemic
- Erica viscosissima E.G.H.Oliv. endemic
- Erica vlokii E.G.H.Oliv. endemic
- Erica vogelpoelii H.A.Baker, endemic
- Erica walkeri Andrews, indigenous
  - Erica walkeri Andrews var. praestans (Andrews) Bolus, endemic
  - Erica walkeri Andrews var. walkeri, endemic
- Erica wendlandiana Klotzsch, endemic
- Erica williamsiorum E.G.H.Oliv. endemic
- Erica winteri H.A.Baker, endemic
- Erica wittebergensis Dulfer, endemic
- Erica woodii Bolus, indigenous
  - Erica woodii Bolus subsp. platyura Hilliard & B.L.Burtt, endemic
  - Erica woodii Bolus var. robusta Dulfer, endemic
  - Erica woodii Bolus var. woodii, indigenous
- Erica wyliei Bolus, endemic
- Erica x flavisepala Guthrie & Bolus, endemic
- Erica xanthina Guthrie & Bolus, endemic
- Erica xeranthemifolia Salisb. endemic
- Erica xerophila Bolus, accepted as Erica wendlandiana Klotzsch, present
- Erica zebrensis Compton, endemic
- Erica zeyheriana (Klotzsch) E.G.H.Oliv. endemic
- Erica zitzikammensis Dulfer, indigenous
  - Erica zitzikammensis Dulfer var. glutinosa Dulfer, endemic*
  - Erica zitzikammensis Dulfer var. zitzikammensis, endemic
- Erica zwartbergensis Bolus, endemic

=== Ericinella ===
Genus Ericinella:

- Ericinella hillburttii E.G.H.Oliv. accepted as Erica hillburttii (E.G.H.Oliv.) E.G.H.Oliv. present
- Ericinella multiflora Klotzsch, accepted as Erica amatolensis E.G.H.Oliv. present
- Ericinella passerinoides Bolus, accepted as Erica passerinoides (Bolus) E.G.H.Oliv. present

=== Grisebachia ===
Genus Grisebachia:

- Grisebachia ciliaris (L.f.) Klotzsch subsp. bolusii (N.E.Br.) E.G.H.Oliv. accepted as Erica plumosa Thunb. present
  - Grisebachia ciliaris (L.f.) Klotzsch subsp. ciliaris, accepted as Erica plumosa Thunb. present
  - Grisebachia ciliaris (L.f.) Klotzsch subsp. ciliciiflora (Salisb.) E.G.H.Oliv. accepted as Erica plumosa Thunb. present
  - Grisebachia ciliaris (L.f.) Klotzsch subsp. involuta (Klotzsch) E.G.H.Oliv. accepted as Erica plumosa Thunb. present
  - Grisebachia ciliaris (L.f.) Klotzsch subsp. multiglandulosa E.G.H.Oliv. accepted as Erica plumosa Thunb. present
- Grisebachia incana (Bartl.) Klotzsch, accepted as Erica plumosa Thunb. present
  - Grisebachia minutiflora N.E.Br. subsp. minutiflora, accepted as Erica caprina E.G.H.Oliv. present
  - Grisebachia minutiflora N.E.Br. subsp. nodiflora (N.E.Br.) E.G.H.Oliv. accepted as Erica caprina E.G.H.Oliv. present
- Grisebachia nivenii N.E.Br. accepted as Erica plumosa Thunb. present
- Grisebachia parviflora (Klotzsch) Druce subsp. eglandula (N.E.Br.) E.G.H.Oliv. accepted as Erica eremioides (MacOwan) E.G.H.Oliv. subsp. eglandula (N.E.Br.) E.G.H.Oliv. present
  - Grisebachia parviflora (Klotzsch) Druce subsp. parviflora, accepted as Erica eremioides (MacOwan) E.G.H.Oliv. subsp. eremioides, present
  - Grisebachia parviflora (Klotzsch) Druce subsp. pubescens E.G.H.Oliv. accepted as Erica eremioides (MacOwan) E.G.H.Oliv. subsp. pubescens (E.G.H.Oliv.) E.G.H.Oliv. present
- Grisebachia plumosa (Thunb.) Klotzsch subsp. eciliata E.G.H.Oliv. accepted as Erica plumosa Thunb. present
  - Grisebachia plumosa (Thunb.) Klotzsch subsp. hirta (Klotzsch) E.G.H.Oliv. accepted as Erica plumosa Thunb. present
  - Grisebachia plumosa (Thunb.) Klotzsch subsp. hispida (Klotzsch) E.G.H.Oliv. accepted as Erica plumosa Thunb. present
  - Grisebachia plumosa]] (Thunb.) Klotzsch subsp. irrorata E.G.H.Oliv. accepted as Erica plumosa Thunb. present
- Grisebachia plumosa (Thunb.) Klotzsch subsp. pentheri (Klotzsch) E.G.H.Oliv. accepted as Erica plumosa Thunb. present
- Grisebachia plumosa (Thunb.) Klotzsch subsp. plumosa, accepted as Erica plumosa Thunb. present
- Grisebachia rigida N.E.Br. accepted as Erica plumosa Thunb. present
- Grisebachia secundiflora E.G.H.Oliv. accepted as Erica lateriflora E.G.H.Oliv. present

=== Nagelocarpus ===
Genus Nagelocarpus:

- Nagelocarpus serratus (Thunb.) Bullock, accepted as Erica serrata Thunb. present

=== Platycalyx ===
Genus Platycalyx:

- Platycalyx pumila N.E.Br. accepted as Erica platycalyx E.G.H.Oliv. present

=== Salaxis ===
Genus Salaxis:

- Salaxis axillaris (Thunb.) G.Don, accepted as Erica axillaris Thunb. present
- Salaxis calyciflora (Tausch) Druce, accepted as Erica artemisioides (Klotzsch) E.G.H.Oliv.
- Salaxis octandra Klotzsch, accepted as Erica axillaris Thunb. present
  - Salaxis octandra Klotzsch var. artemisioides (Klotzsch) N.E.Br. accepted as Erica artemisioides (Klotzsch) E.G.H.Oliv. present
- Salaxis pumila N.E.Br. accepted as Erica bredasiana E.G.H.Oliv. present
- Salaxis triflora Compton, accepted as Erica terniflora E.G.H.Oliv. present

=== Scyphogyne ===
Genus Scyphogyne:

- Scyphogyne calcicola E.G.H.Oliv. accepted as Erica calcicola (E.G.H.Oliv.) E.G.H.Oliv. present
- Scyphogyne capitata (Klotzsch) Benth. var. capitata, accepted as Erica phacelanthera E.G.H.Oliv. present
- Scyphogyne divaricata (Klotzsch) Benth. accepted as Erica rigidula (N.E.Br.) E.G.H.Oliv. present
- Scyphogyne eglandulosa (Klotzsch) Benth. accepted as Erica eglandulosa (Klotzsch) E.G.H.Oliv. present
- Scyphogyne fasciculata Benth. accepted as Erica eglandulosa (Klotzsch) E.G.H.Oliv. present
- Scyphogyne longistyla N.E.Br. accepted as Erica rigidula (N.E.Br.) E.G.H.Oliv. present
- Scyphogyne micrantha (Benth.) N.E.Br. accepted as Erica artemisioides (Klotzsch) E.G.H.Oliv. present
- Scyphogyne muscosa (Aiton) Druce, accepted as Erica muscosa (Aiton) E.G.H.Oliv. present
- Scyphogyne orientalis E.G.H.Oliv. accepted as Erica melanomontana E.G.H.Oliv. present
- Scyphogyne puberula (Klotzsch) Benth. accepted as Erica urceolata (Klotzsch) E.G.H.Oliv. present
- Scyphogyne remota N.E.Br. accepted as Erica remota (N.E.Br.) E.G.H.Oliv. present
- Scyphogyne tenuis (Benth.) E.G.H.Oliv. accepted as Erica miniscula E.G.H.Oliv. present
- Scyphogyne urceolata (Klotzsch) Benth. accepted as Erica urceolata (Klotzsch) E.G.H.Oliv. present

=== Simocheilus ===
Genus Simocheilus:

- Simocheilus acutangulus N.E.Br. accepted as Erica glabella Thunb. subsp. laevis E.G.H.Oliv. present
- Simocheilus albirameus N.E.Br. accepted as Erica inaequalis (N.E.Br.) E.G.H.Oliv. present
- Simocheilus barbiger Klotzsch, accepted as Erica uberiflora E.G.H.Oliv. present
- Simocheilus bicolor (Klotzsch) Klotzsch, accepted as Erica inaequalis (N.E.Br.) E.G.H.Oliv. present
- Simocheilus carneus Klotzsch, accepted as Erica uberiflora E.G.H.Oliv. present
- Simocheilus consors N.E.Br. accepted as Erica globiceps (N.E.Br.) E.G.H.Oliv. subsp. consors (N.E.Br.) E.G.H.Oliv. present
- Simocheilus depressus (Licht. ex Roem. & Schult.) Benth. var. depressus, accepted as Erica glabella Thunb. subsp. glabella, present
  - Simocheilus depressus (Licht. ex Roem. & Schult.) Benth. var. patens N.E.Br. accepted as Erica glabella Thunb. subsp. glabella, present
- Simocheilus dispar N.E.Br. accepted as Erica dispar (N.E.Br.) E.G.H.Oliv. present
- Simocheilus fourcadei (L.Guthrie) E.G.H.Oliv. accepted as Erica angulosa E.G.H.Oliv. present
- Simocheilus glaber (Thunb.) Benth. accepted as Erica inaequalis (N.E.Br.) E.G.H.Oliv. present
- Simocheilus globiferus N.E.Br. accepted as Erica glabella Thunb. subsp. laevis E.G.H.Oliv. present
- Simocheilus hirtus (Klotzsch) E.G.H.Oliv. accepted as Erica glabella Thunb. subsp. laevis E.G.H.Oliv. present
- Simocheilus multiflorus Klotzsch var. multiflorus, accepted as Erica uberiflora E.G.H.Oliv. present
  - Simocheilus multiflorus Klotzsch var. atherstonei N.E.Br. accepted as Erica uberiflora E.G.H.Oliv. present
- Simocheilus oblongus Benth. accepted as Erica dregei E.G.H.Oliv. present
- Simocheilus patulus N.E.Br. accepted as Erica glabella Thunb. subsp. laevis E.G.H.Oliv. present
- Simocheilus piquetbergensis N.E.Br. accepted as Erica piquetbergensis (N.E.Br.) E.G.H.Oliv. present
- Simocheilus puberulus (Klotzsch) E.G.H.Oliv. accepted as Erica inaequalis (N.E.Br.) E.G.H.Oliv. present
- Simocheilus pubescens Klotzsch, accepted as Erica uberiflora E.G.H.Oliv. present
- Simocheilus purpureus (P.J.Bergius) Druce, accepted as Erica glabella Thunb. subsp. glabella, present
- Simocheilus quadrisulcus N.E.Br. accepted as Erica phaeocarpa (N.E.Br.) E.G.H.Oliv. present
- Simocheilus submuticus Benth. accepted as Erica glabella Thunb. subsp. laevis E.G.H.Oliv. present
- Simocheilus subrigidus N.E.Br. accepted as Erica glabella Thunb. subsp. laevis E.G.H.Oliv. present

=== Stokoeanthus ===
Genus Stokoeanthus:

- Stokoeanthus chionophilus E.G.H.Oliv. accepted as Erica stokoeanthus E.G.H.Oliv. present

=== Sympieza ===
Genus Sympieza:

- Sympieza eckloniana Klotzsch, accepted as Erica ecklonii E.G.H.Oliv. present
- Sympieza gracilis (Bartl.) E.G.H.Oliv. accepted as Erica benthamiana E.G.H.Oliv. present
- Sympieza labialis (Salisb.) Druce, accepted as Erica labialis Salisb. present

=== Syndesmanthus ===
Genus Syndesmanthus:

- Syndesmanthus articulatus (L.) Klotzsch var. articulatus, accepted as Erica similis (N.E.Br.) E.G.H.Oliv. present
  - Syndesmanthus articulatus (L.) Klotzsch var. fasciculatus N.E.Br. accepted as Erica similis (N.E.Br.) E.G.H.Oliv. present
- Syndesmanthus breviflorus N.E.Br. accepted as Erica brownii E.G.H.Oliv. present
- Syndesmanthus ciliatus (Klotzsch) Benth. accepted as Erica paucifolia (J.C.Wendl.) E.G.H.Oliv. subsp. ciliata (Klotzsch) E.G.H.Oliv. present
- Syndesmanthus elimensis N.E.Br. var. elimensis, accepted as Erica similis (N.E.Br.) E.G.H.Oliv. present
- Syndesmanthus erinus (Klotzsch ex Benth.) N.E.Br. var. erinus, accepted as Erica erinus (Klotzsch ex Benth.) E.G.H.Oliv. present
- Syndesmanthus erinus (Klotzsch ex Benth.) N.E.Br. var. validus N.E.Br. accepted as Erica erinus (Klotzsch ex Benth.) E.G.H.Oliv. present
- Syndesmanthus globiceps N.E.Br. accepted as Erica globiceps (N.E.Br.) E.G.H.Oliv. subsp. globiceps, present
- Syndesmanthus gracilis (Benth.) N.E.Br. accepted as Erica globiceps (N.E.Br.) E.G.H.Oliv. subsp. gracilis (Benth.) E.G.H.Oliv. present
- Syndesmanthus nivenii N.E.Br. accepted as Erica niveniana E.G.H.Oliv. present
- Syndesmanthus paucifolius (J.C.Wendl.) Benth. accepted as Erica paucifolia (J.C.Wendl.) E.G.H.Oliv. subsp. paucifolia, present
- Syndesmanthus pulchellus N.E.Br. accepted as Erica pulchelliflora E.G.H.Oliv. present
- Syndesmanthus pumilus N.E.Br. accepted as Erica innovans E.G.H.Oliv. present
- Syndesmanthus scaber Klotzsch, accepted as Erica similis (N.E.Br.) E.G.H.Oliv. present
- Syndesmanthus schlechteri N.E.Br. accepted as Erica agglutinans E.G.H.Oliv. present
- Syndesmanthus similis N.E.Br. accepted as Erica similis (N.E.Br.) E.G.H.Oliv. present
- Syndesmanthus squarrosus Benth. accepted as Erica paucifolia (J.C.Wendl.) E.G.H.Oliv. subsp. squarrosa (Benth.) E.G.H.Oliv. present
- Syndesmanthus sympeizoides N.E.Br. accepted as Erica globiceps (N.E.Br.) E.G.H.Oliv. subsp. globiceps, present
- Syndesmanthus venustus N.E.Br. accepted as Erica venustiflora E.G.H.Oliv. subsp. venustiflora, present
- Syndesmanthus viscosus (Bolus) N.E.Br. accepted as Erica viscosissima E.G.H.Oliv. present
- Syndesmanthus zeyheri Bolus, accepted as Erica globiceps (N.E.Br.) E.G.H.Oliv. subsp. globiceps, present

=== Thamnus ===
Genus Thamnus:

- Thamnus multiflorus Klotzsch, accepted as Erica thamnoides E.G.H.Oliv. present

=== Thoracosperma ===
Genus Thoracosperma:

- Thoracosperma bondiae Compton, accepted as Erica rosacea (L.Guthrie) E.G.H.Oliv. subsp. rosacea, present
- Thoracosperma fourcadei Compton, accepted as Erica rosacea (L.Guthrie) E.G.H.Oliv. subsp. rosacea, present
- Thoracosperma galpinii N.E.Br. accepted as Erica rosacea (L.Guthrie) E.G.H.Oliv. subsp. rosacea, present
- Thoracosperma interruptum N.E.Br. accepted as Erica interrupta (N.E.Br.) E.G.H.Oliv. present
- Thoracosperma marlothii N.E.Br. accepted as Erica rosacea (L.Guthrie) E.G.H.Oliv. subsp. glabrata E.G.H.Oliv. present
- Thoracosperma muirii L.Guthrie, accepted as Erica rosacea (L.Guthrie) E.G.H.Oliv. subsp. rosacea, present
- Thoracosperma nanum N.E.Br. accepted as Erica bolusanthus E.G.H.Oliv. present
- Thoracosperma paniculatum (Thunb.) Klotzsch, accepted as Erica quadrifida (Benth.) E.G.H.Oliv. present
- Thoracosperma puberulum (Klotzsch) N.E.Br. accepted as Erica puberuliflora E.G.H.Oliv. present
- Thoracosperma radicans L.Guthrie, accepted as Erica radicans (L.Guthrie) E.G.H.Oliv. subsp. radicans, present
- Thoracosperma rosaceum L.Guthrie, accepted as Erica rosacea (L.Guthrie) E.G.H.Oliv. subsp. rosacea, present
- Thoracosperma viscidum L.Guthrie, accepted as Erica interrupta (N.E.Br.) E.G.H.Oliv. present

=== Vaccinium ===
Genus Vaccinium:

- Vaccinium exul Bolus, indigenous

== Lecythidaceae ==
Family: Lecythidaceae,

=== Barringtonia ===
Genus Barringtonia:

- Barringtonia racemosa (L.) Roxb. indigenous

== Maesaceae ==
Family: Maesaceae,

=== Maesa ===
Genus Maesa:

- Maesa alnifolia Harv. endemic
- Maesa lanceolata Forssk. indigenous

== Myrsinaceae ==
Family: Myrsinaceae,

=== Ardisia ===
Genus Ardisia:

- Ardisia crenata Sims, not indigenous, naturalised, invasive
- Ardisia elliptica Thunb. not indigenous, naturalised, invasive

=== Embelia ===
Genus Embelia:

- Embelia ruminata (E.Mey. ex A.DC.) Mez, endemic

=== Myrsine ===
Genus Myrsine:

- Myrsine africana L. indigenous
- Myrsine pillansii Adamson, indigenous

=== Rapanea ===
Genus Rapanea:

- Rapanea gilliana (Sond.) Mez, endemic
- Rapanea melanophloeos (L.) Mez, indigenous

== Primulaceae ==
Family: Primulaceae,

=== Anagallis ===
Genus Anagallis:

- Anagallis arvensis L. not indigenous, naturalised, invasive
  - Anagallis arvensis L. subsp. arvensis, not indigenous, naturalised
- Anagallis huttonii Harv. indigenous
- Anagallis pumila Sw. not indigenous, naturalised
- Anagallis tenuicaulis Baker, indigenous

=== Lysimachia ===
Genus Lysimachia:

- Lysimachia nutans Nees, endemic
- Lysimachia ruhmeriana Vatke, indigenous

=== Primula ===
Genus Primula:

- Primula malacoides Franch. not indigenous, cultivated, naturalised
- Primula vulgaris Huds. not indigenous, cultivated, naturalised

== Roridulaceae ==
Family: Roridulaceae,

=== Roridula ===
Genus Roridula:

- Roridula dentata L. endemic
- Roridula gorgonias Planch. endemic

== Sapotaceae ==
Family: Sapotaceae,

=== Donella ===
Genus Donella:

- Donella viridifolia (J.M.Wood & Franks) Aubrév. & Pellegr., indigenous

=== Englerophytum ===
Genus Englerophytum:

- Englerophytum magalismontanum (Sond.) T.D.Penn. indigenous
- Englerophytum natalense (Sond.) T.D.Penn. indigenous

=== Inhambanella ===
Genus Inhambanella:

- Inhambanella henriquesii (Engl. & Warb.) Dubard, indigenous

=== Lecomtedoxa ===
Genus Lecomtedoxa:

- Lecomtedoxa henriquesii (Engl. & Warb.) A.Meeuse, accepted as Inhambanella henriquesii (Engl. & Warb.) Dubard, present

=== Manilkara ===
Genus Manilkara:

- Manilkara concolor (Harv.) Gerstner, indigenous
- Manilkara discolor (Sond.) J.H.Hemsl. indigenous
- Manilkara mochisia (Baker) Dubard, indigenous
- Manilkara nicholsonii A.E.van Wyk, endemic

=== Mimusops ===
Genus Mimusops:

- Mimusops afra E.Mey. ex A.DC. indigenous
- Mimusops obovata Nees ex Sond. indigenous
- Mimusops obtusifolia Lam. indigenous
- Mimusops zeyheri Sond. indigenous

=== Sideroxylon ===
Genus Sideroxylon:

- Sideroxylon cymosum L.f. accepted as Olinia ventosa (L.) Cufod. indigenous
- Sideroxylon inerme L. indigenous
  - Sideroxylon inerme L. subsp. inerme, indigenous

=== Vitellariopsis ===
Genus Vitellariopsis:

- Vitellariopsis dispar (N.E.Br.) Aubrev. indigenous
- Vitellariopsis marginata (N.E.Br.) Aubrev. indigenous

== Theophrastaceae ==
Family: Theophrastaceae,

=== Samolus ===
Genus Samolus:

- Samolus porosus (L.f.) Thunb. endemic
- Samolus valerandi L. indigenous
