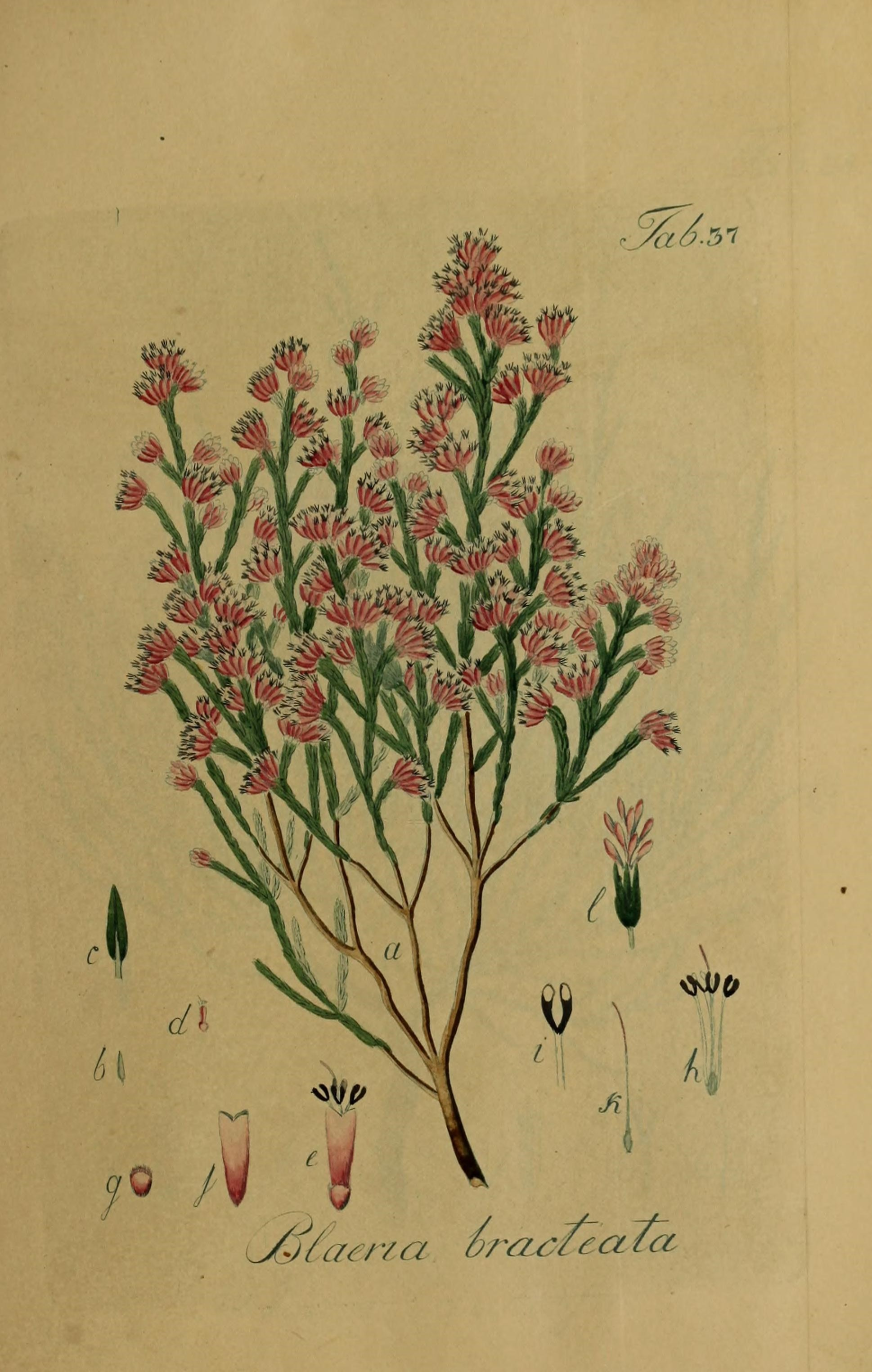

Scientific classification
- Kingdom: Plantae
- Clade: Tracheophytes
- Clade: Angiosperms
- Clade: Eudicots
- Clade: Asterids
- Order: Ericales
- Family: Ericaceae
- Genus: Erica
- Species: E. labialis

Binomial name
- Erica labialis Salisb., (1802)

Synonyms
- Sympieza brachyphylla Benth.; Sympieza breviflora N.E.Br.; Sympieza capitellata Licht. ex Roem. & Schult.; Sympieza labialis Druce; Sympieza pallescens N.E.Br.; Sympieza tenuiflora Benth.; Sympieza vestita N.E.Br.

= Erica labialis =

Species of flowering plant

Erica labialis is a plant that belongs to the genus Erica and is part of the fynbos. The species is endemic to the Western Cape.
