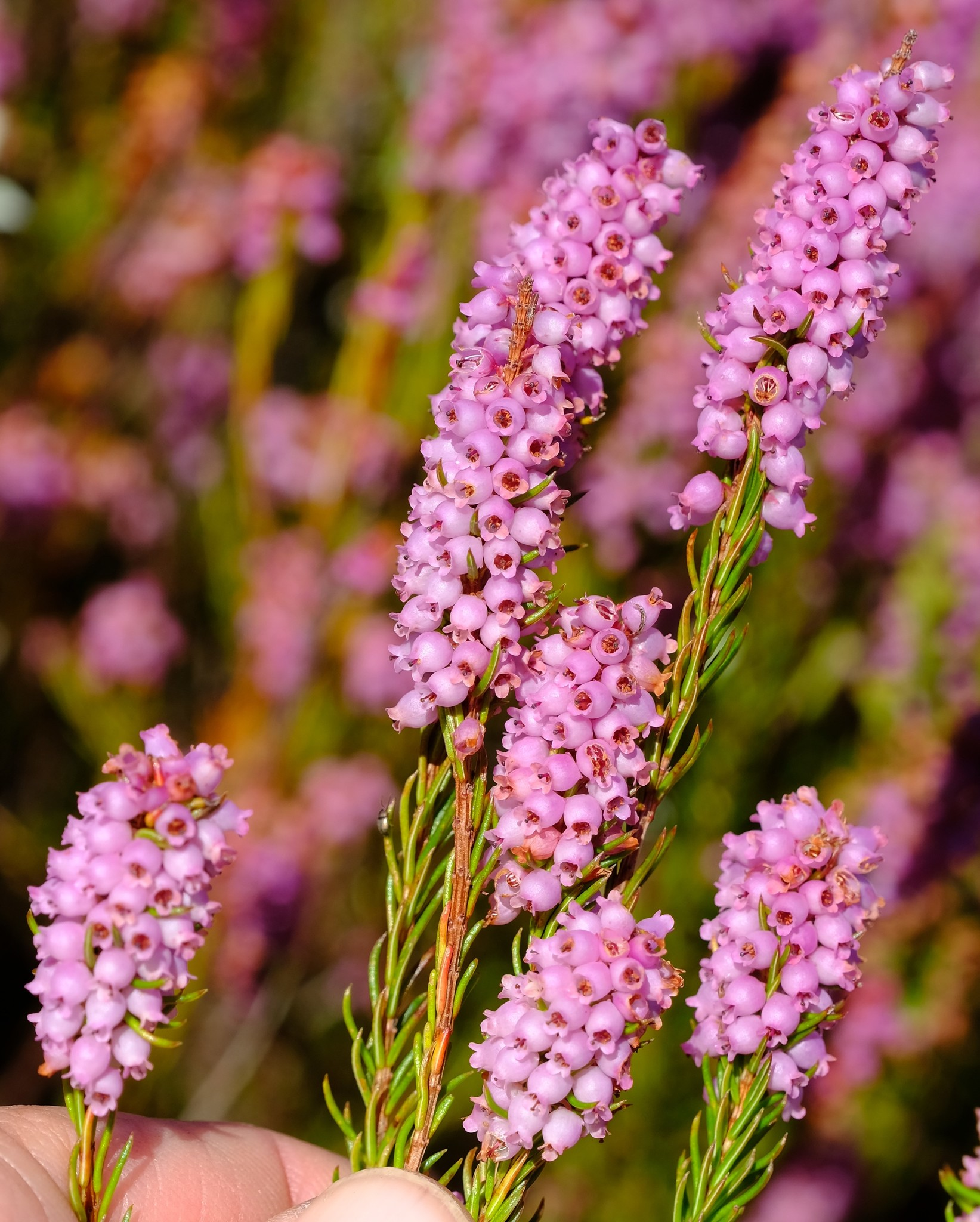

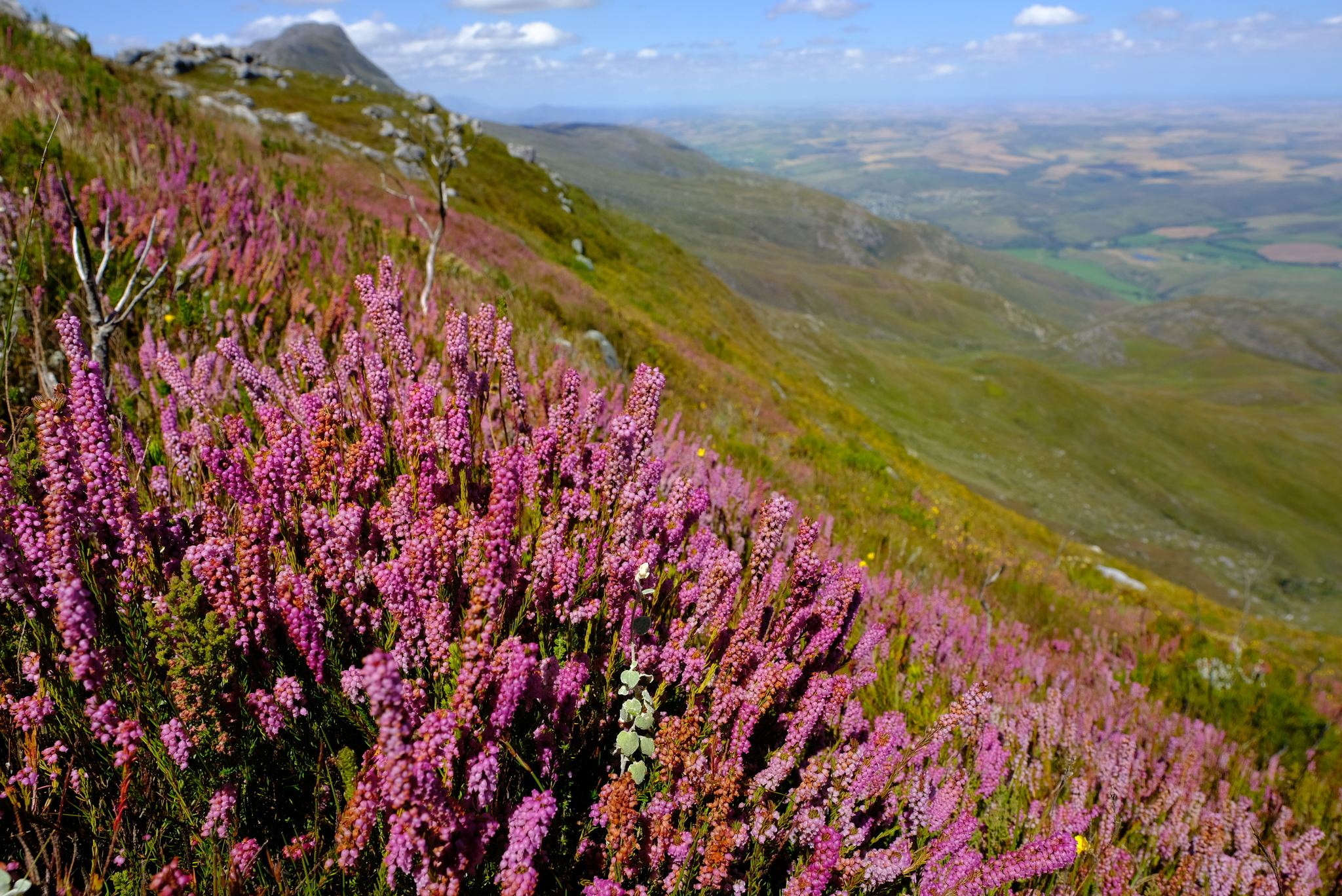

Scientific classification
- Kingdom: Plantae
- Clade: Tracheophytes
- Clade: Angiosperms
- Clade: Eudicots
- Clade: Asterids
- Order: Ericales
- Family: Ericaceae
- Genus: Erica
- Species: E. regerminans

Binomial name
- Erica regerminans L.

Synonyms
- Erica ellipticiflora Dulfer; Erica juncea Bartl.; Erica leucantha G.Don; Erica lichtensteinii Klotzsch; Erica multumbellifera Benth.; Erica pelviformis Salisb.; Erica persoluta Curtis; Erica racemifera Andrews; Erica regerminans Andrews; Erica rosea Licht. ex Klotzsch; Erica smithiana G.Lodd. ex Sinclair; Erica uncifolia Salisb.; Erica virescens Thunb.; Ericoides regerminans (L.) Kuntze; Ericoides virescens (Thunb.) Kuntze; Syringodea virescens (Thunb.) G.Don

= Erica regerminans =

Species of flowering plant

Erica regerminans, the cold heath, is a plant belonging to the genus Erica. The species is endemic to the Western Cape and is part of the fynbos.
