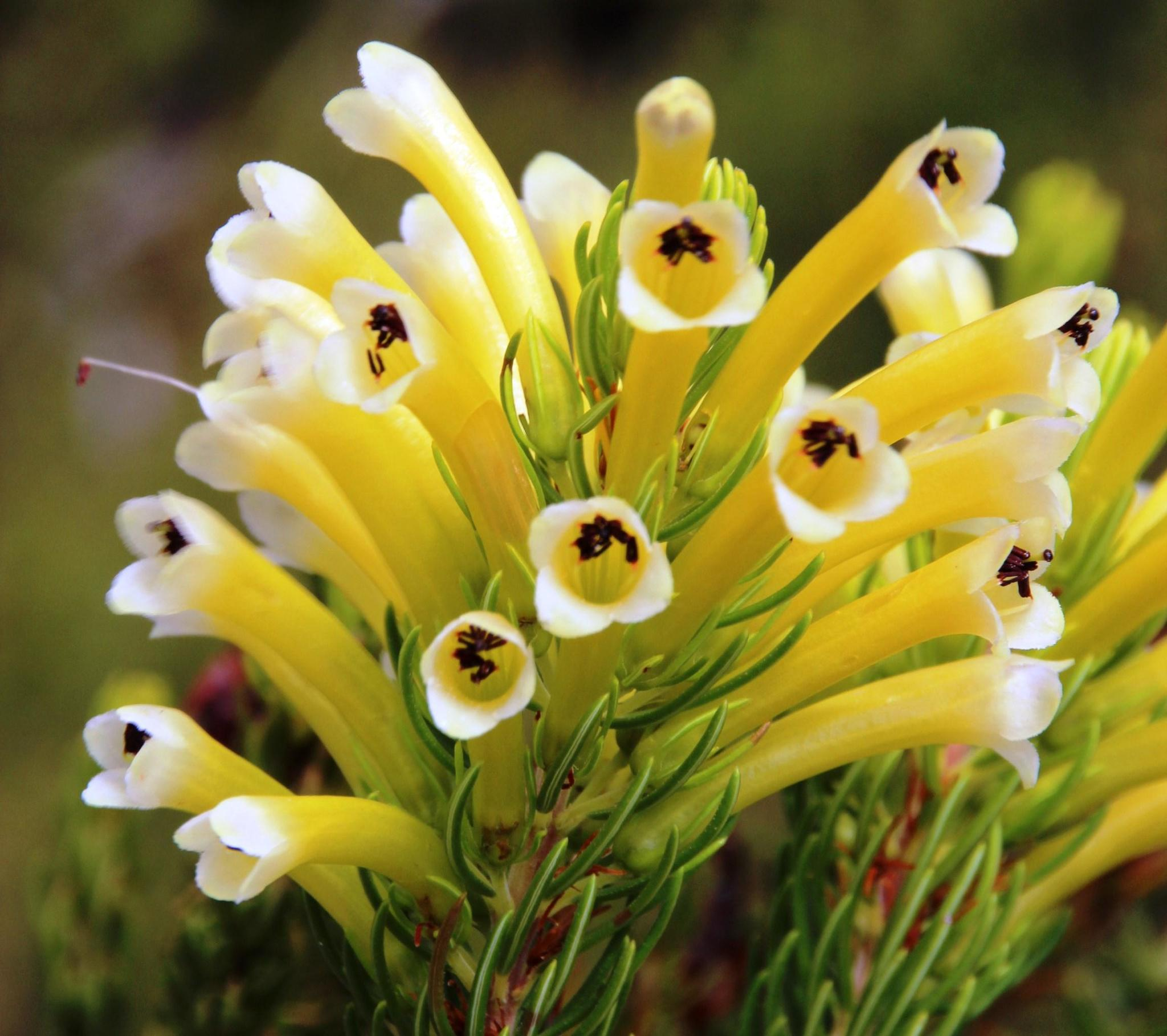

Scientific classification
- Kingdom: Plantae
- Clade: Tracheophytes
- Clade: Angiosperms
- Clade: Eudicots
- Clade: Asterids
- Order: Ericales
- Family: Ericaceae
- Genus: Erica
- Species: E. pinea

Binomial name
- Erica pinea Thunb., (1785)

Synonyms
- Erica argentiflora Andrews; Erica aurea Andrews; Ericoides aureum (Andrews) Kuntze; Syringodea aurea (Andrews) G.Don; Syringodea pinea (Thunb.) G.Don

= Erica pinea =

Species of flowering plant

Erica pinea is a plant belonging to the genus Erica and is part of the fynbos. The species is endemic to the Western Cape.
