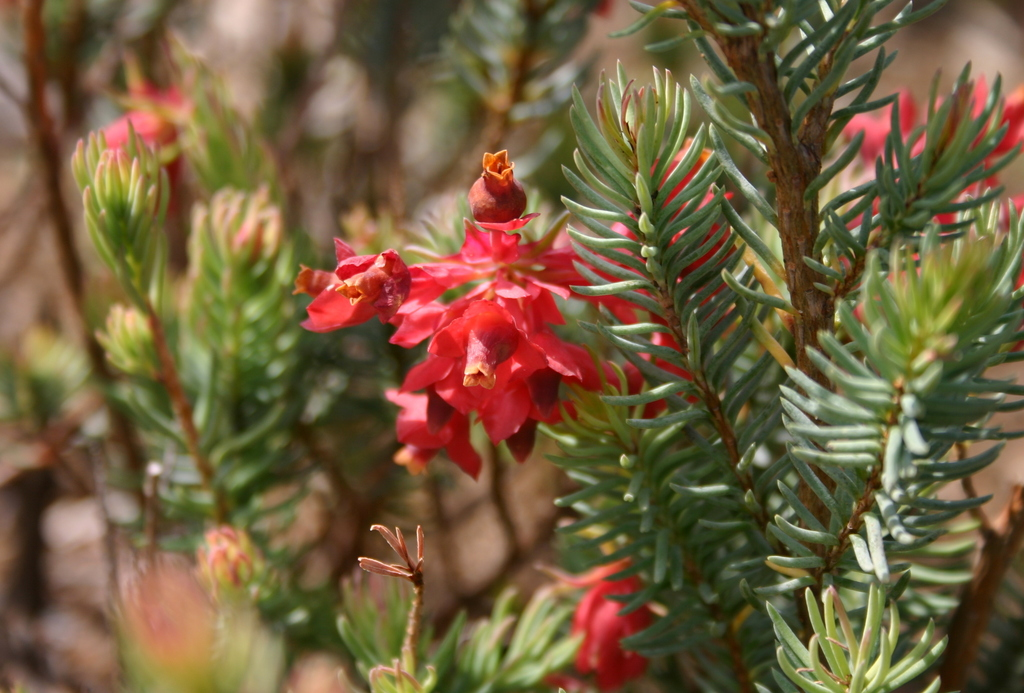

Scientific classification
- Kingdom: Plantae
- Clade: Tracheophytes
- Clade: Angiosperms
- Clade: Eudicots
- Clade: Asterids
- Order: Ericales
- Family: Ericaceae
- Genus: Erica
- Species: E. glauca

Binomial name
- Erica glauca Andr.

Synonyms
- Ericoides glaucum (Andrews) Kuntze; Eurystegia elegans G.Don; Eurystegia glauca D.Don

= Erica glauca =

Species of flowering plant

Erica glauca, also known as the cup-and-saucer heath, is a plant belonging to the genus Erica and forming part of the fynbos.
