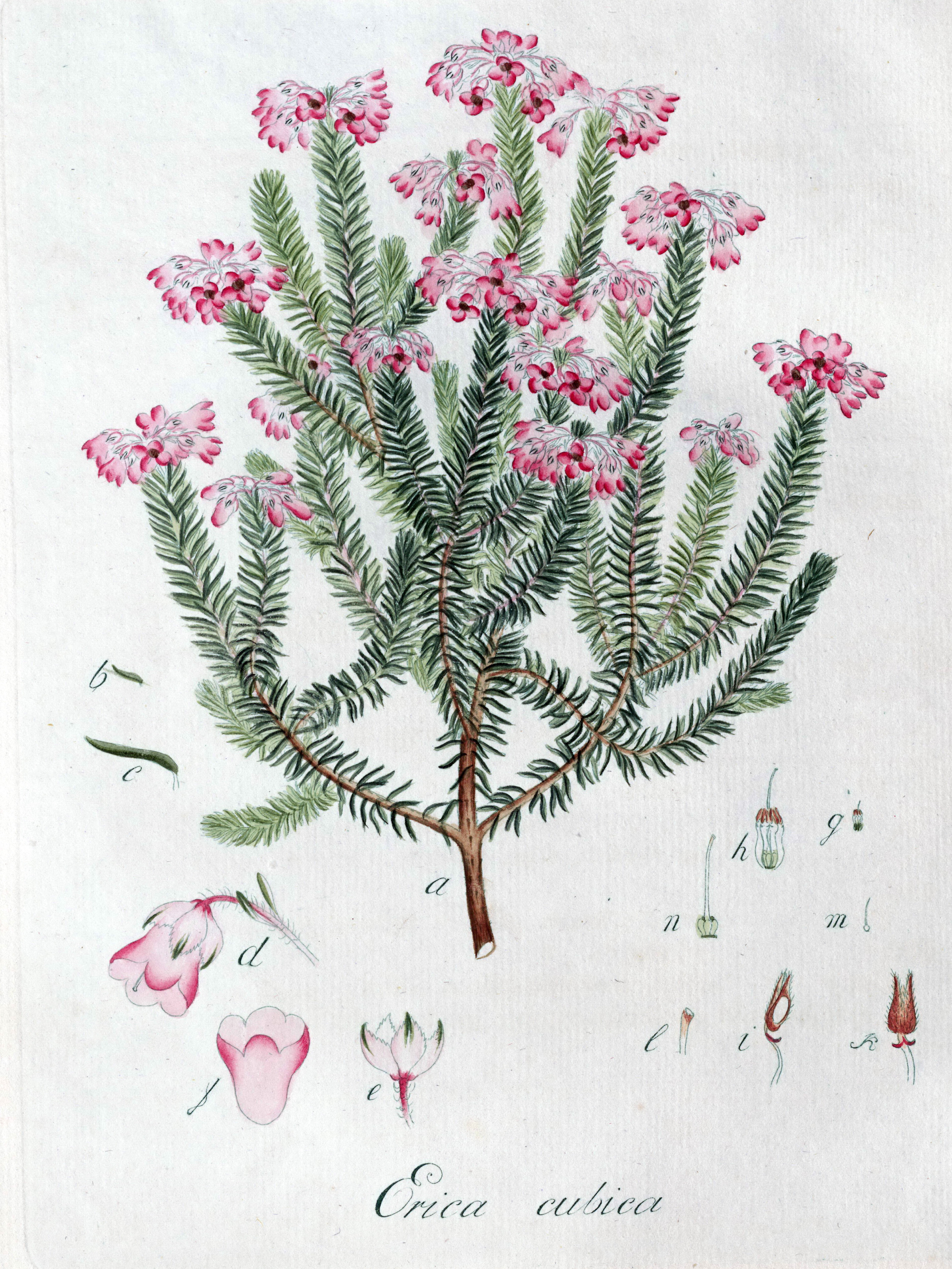

Scientific classification
- Kingdom: Plantae
- Clade: Tracheophytes
- Clade: Angiosperms
- Clade: Eudicots
- Clade: Asterids
- Order: Ericales
- Family: Ericaceae
- Genus: Erica
- Species: E. cubica

Binomial name
- Erica cubica L., (1771)

Synonyms
- Ericoides cubicum (L.) Kuntze; Lophandra cubica D.Don

= Erica cubica =

Species of flowering plant

Erica cubica is a plant belonging to the genus Erica. The species is endemic to KwaZulu-Natal, the Eastern Cape and the Western Cape.
