= Erica tenuifolia =

Scientific classification
- Kingdom: Plantae
- Clade: Tracheophytes
- Clade: Angiosperms
- Clade: Eudicots
- Clade: Asterids
- Order: Ericales
- Family: Ericaceae
- Genus: Erica
- Species: E. tenuifolia

Binomial name
- Erica tenuifolia L.

Synonyms
- Erica linifolia Salisb.; Ericoides tenuifolium (L.) Kuntze; Lamprotis tenuifolia D.Don

Species of flowering plant

Erica tenuifolia, the white heath, is a plant belonging to the genus Erica. The species is endemic to the Western Cape.
