= Erica sagittata =

Scientific classification
- Kingdom: Plantae
- Clade: Tracheophytes
- Clade: Angiosperms
- Clade: Eudicots
- Clade: Asterids
- Order: Ericales
- Family: Ericaceae
- Genus: Erica
- Species: E. sagittata

Binomial name
- Erica sagittata Klotzsch ex Benth.

Synonyms
- Blaeria grandis N.E.Br.; Blaeria sagittata (Klotzsch ex Benth.) Alm & T.C.E.Fr.; Ericoides sagittatum (Klotzsch ex Benth.) Kuntze

Species of flowering plant

Erica sagittata is a plant belonging to the genus Erica and is part of the fynbos. The species is endemic to the Eastern Cape and occurs in the Vanstadensberg, west of Port Elizabeth. The plant has lost large parts of its habitat to plantations. There are three to five subpopulations remaining and the number of plants is decreasing due to invasive plants and the declining quality of the habitat.
