= Erica brevifolia =

Scientific classification
- Kingdom: Plantae
- Clade: Tracheophytes
- Clade: Angiosperms
- Clade: Eudicots
- Clade: Asterids
- Order: Ericales
- Family: Ericaceae
- Genus: Erica
- Species: E. brevifolia

Binomial name
- Erica brevifolia Sol. ex Salisb.

Synonyms
- Erica callosa J.C.Wendl.; Erica obtusa G.Lodd. ex J.Forbes; Erica pachyphylla Spreng.; Ericoides brevifolium (Sol. ex Salisb.) Kuntze; Eurylepis pachyphylla G.Don; Lamprotis brevifolia G.Don; Lamprotis chlamydiflora G.Don

Species of flowering plant

Erica brevifolia is a plant belonging to the genus Erica and forming part of the fynbos. The species is endemic to the Western Cape.
