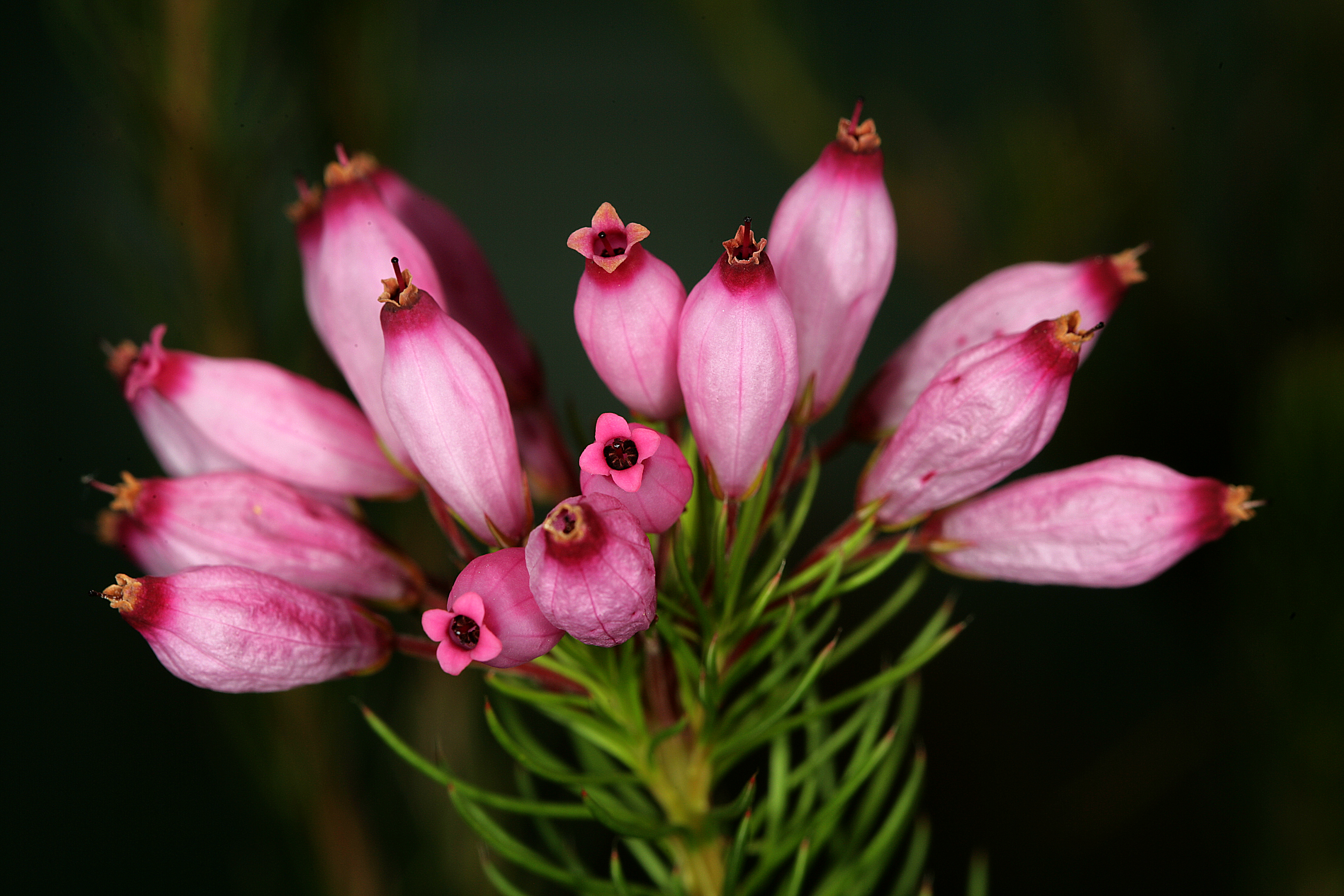

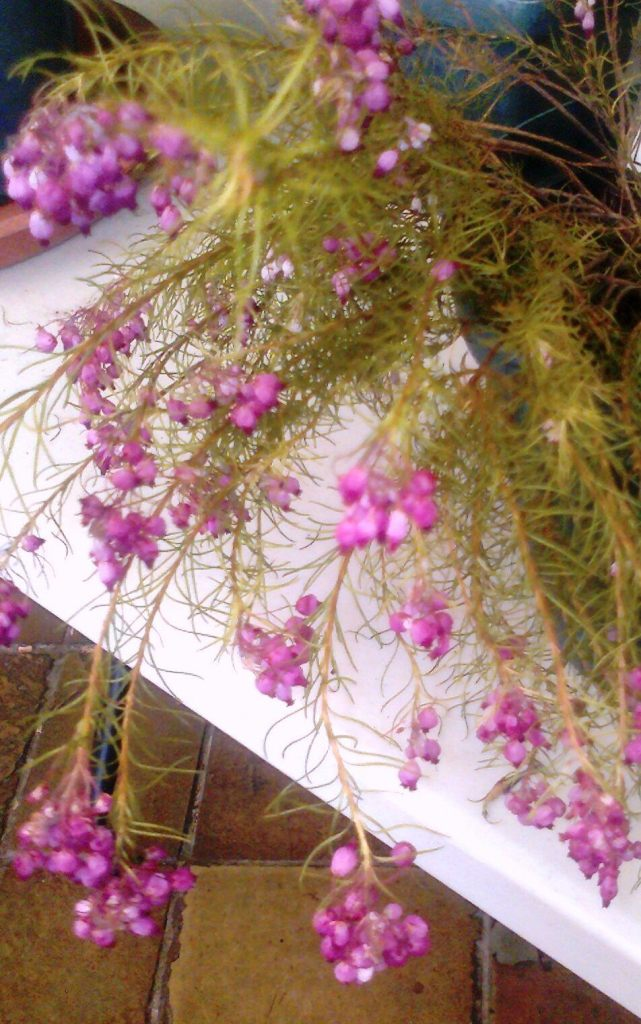

Scientific classification
- Kingdom: Plantae
- Clade: Tracheophytes
- Clade: Angiosperms
- Clade: Eudicots
- Clade: Asterids
- Order: Ericales
- Family: Ericaceae
- Genus: Erica
- Species: E. inflata

Binomial name
- Erica inflata Thunb., (1785)

Synonyms
- Callista inflata G.Don; Callista sainsburiana G.Don; Erica amabilis Salisb.; Erica carneola Sinclair; Erica carniula G.Lodd.; Erica ollula Andrews; Erica sainsburyana Andrews; Ericoides inflatum (Thunb.) Kuntze

= Erica inflata =

Species of flowering plant

Erica inflata, the balloon heath, is a plant belonging to the genus Erica and is part of the fynbos. The species is endemic to the Western Cape.
