= Erica thunbergii =

Scientific classification
- Kingdom: Plantae
- Clade: Tracheophytes
- Clade: Angiosperms
- Clade: Eudicots
- Clade: Asterids
- Order: Ericales
- Family: Ericaceae
- Genus: Erica
- Species: E. thunbergii

Binomial name
- Erica thunbergii Montin

Synonyms
- Erica medioliflora Salisb.; Ericoides thunbergii (Montin) Kuntze; Eurylepis thunbergii D.Don

Species of flowering plant

Erica thunbergii, the Cape Malay heath, is a plant belonging to the genus Erica. The species is endemic to the Western Cape.
