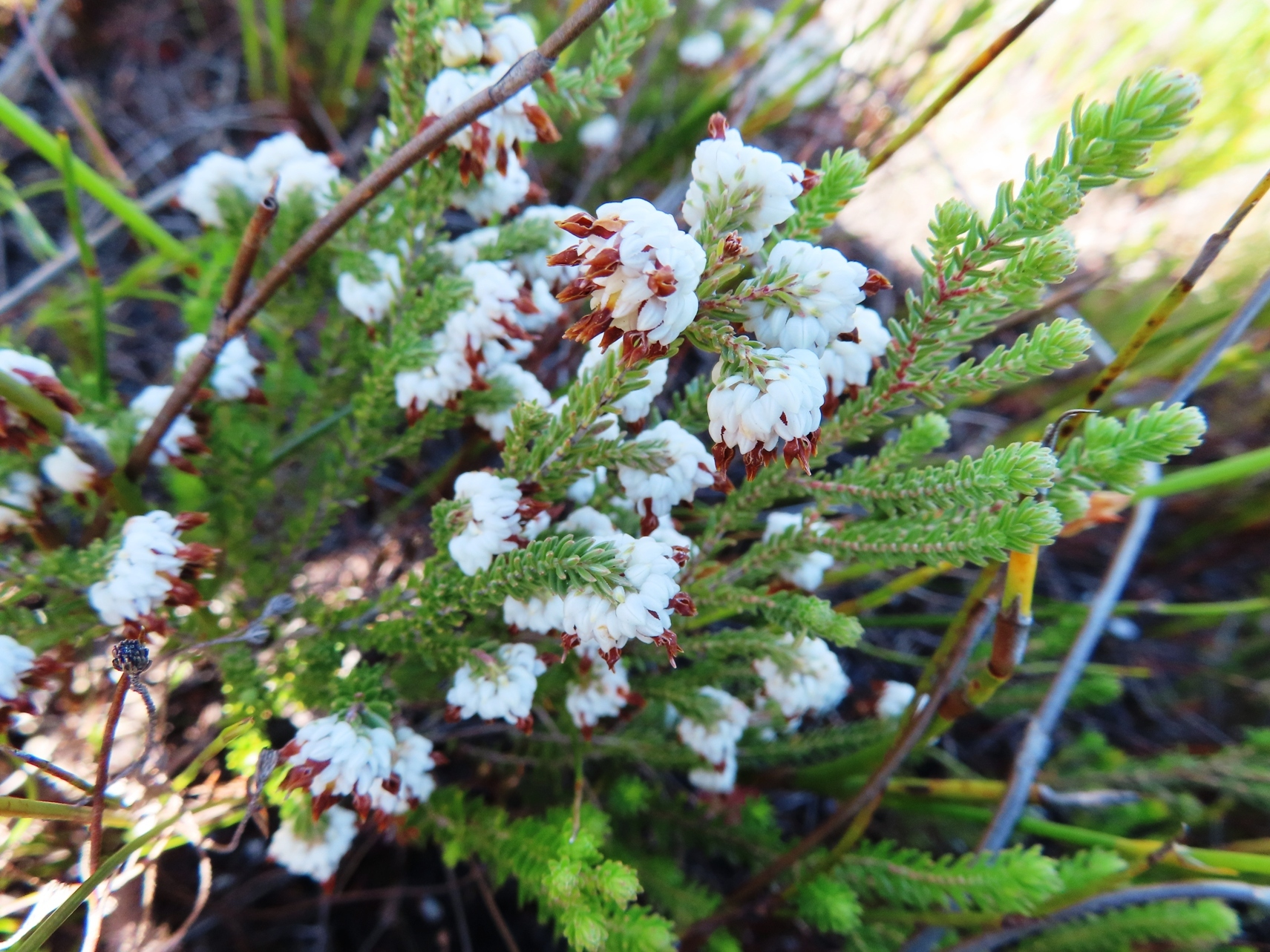

Scientific classification
- Kingdom: Plantae
- Clade: Tracheophytes
- Clade: Angiosperms
- Clade: Eudicots
- Clade: Asterids
- Order: Ericales
- Family: Ericaceae
- Genus: Erica
- Species: E. cumuliflora

Binomial name
- Erica cumuliflora Salisb.

Synonyms
- Erica aggregata Roxb. ex Salisb.; Erica horizontalis Andrews; Erica tricolor Spreng.; Ericoides cumuliflorum (Salisb.) Kuntze; Gypsocallis horizontalis G.Don

= Erica cumuliflora =

Species of flowering plant

Erica cumuliflora is a plant belonging to the genus Erica and forming part of the fynbos. The species is endemic to the Western Cape.
