= Erica blancheana =

Scientific classification
- Kingdom: Plantae
- Clade: Tracheophytes
- Clade: Angiosperms
- Clade: Eudicots
- Clade: Asterids
- Order: Ericales
- Family: Ericaceae
- Genus: Erica
- Species: E. blancheana

Binomial name
- Erica blancheana L.Bolus

Species of flowering plant

Erica blancheana is a plant that belongs to the genus Erica and forms part of the fynbos.
