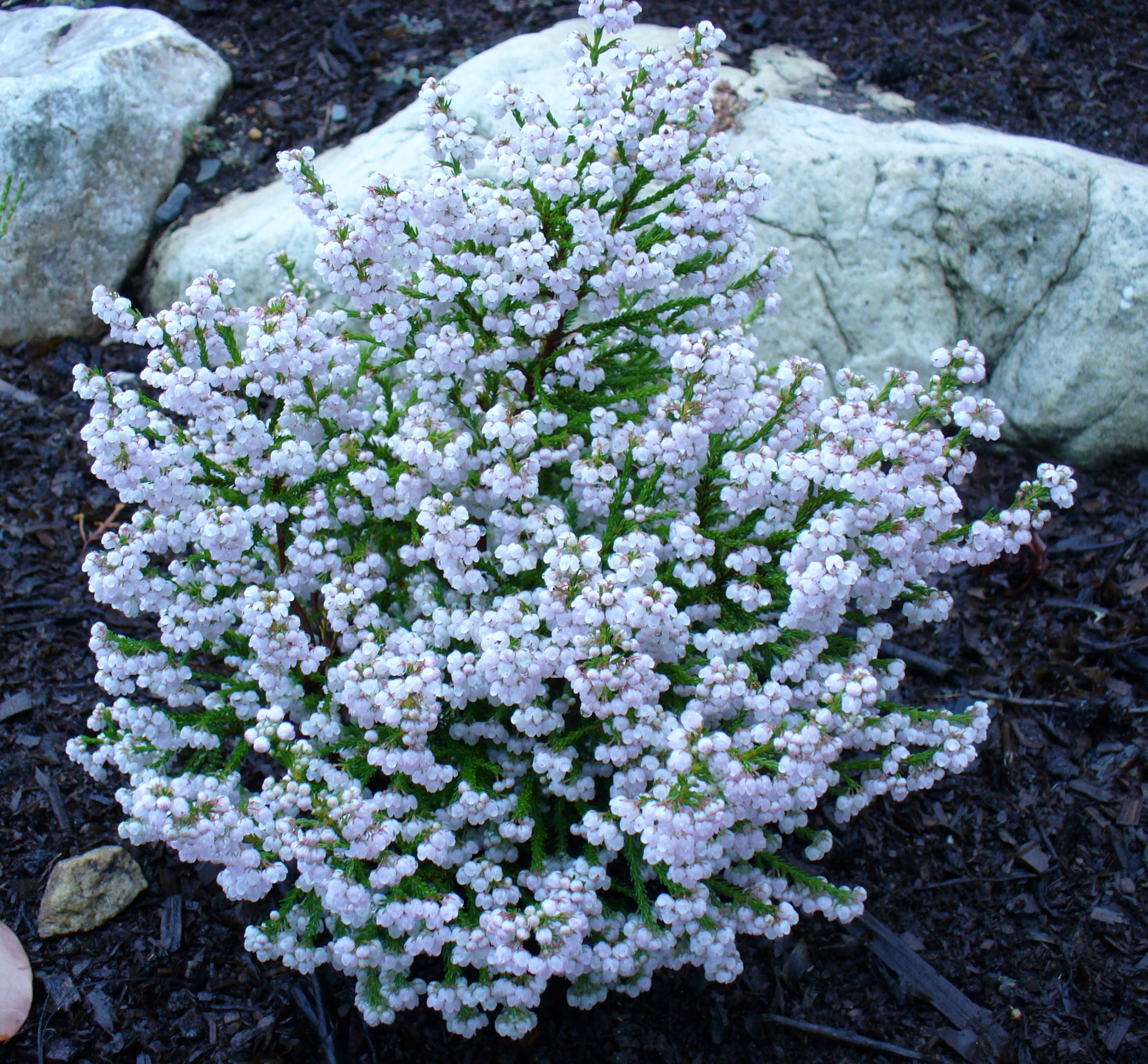

Scientific classification
- Kingdom: Plantae
- Clade: Tracheophytes
- Clade: Angiosperms
- Clade: Eudicots
- Clade: Asterids
- Order: Ericales
- Family: Ericaceae
- Genus: Erica
- Species: E. capensis

Binomial name
- Erica capensis Salisb.

= Erica capensis =

Species of flowering plant

Erica capensis, the Cape heath, is a genus of Erica and the formingpart of the fynbos. The species is rare and endemic to the Western Cape where it only occurs in the Table Mountain National Park in a swampy area. The scientific name of this species was first published by T.M.Salter.

== Gallery ==
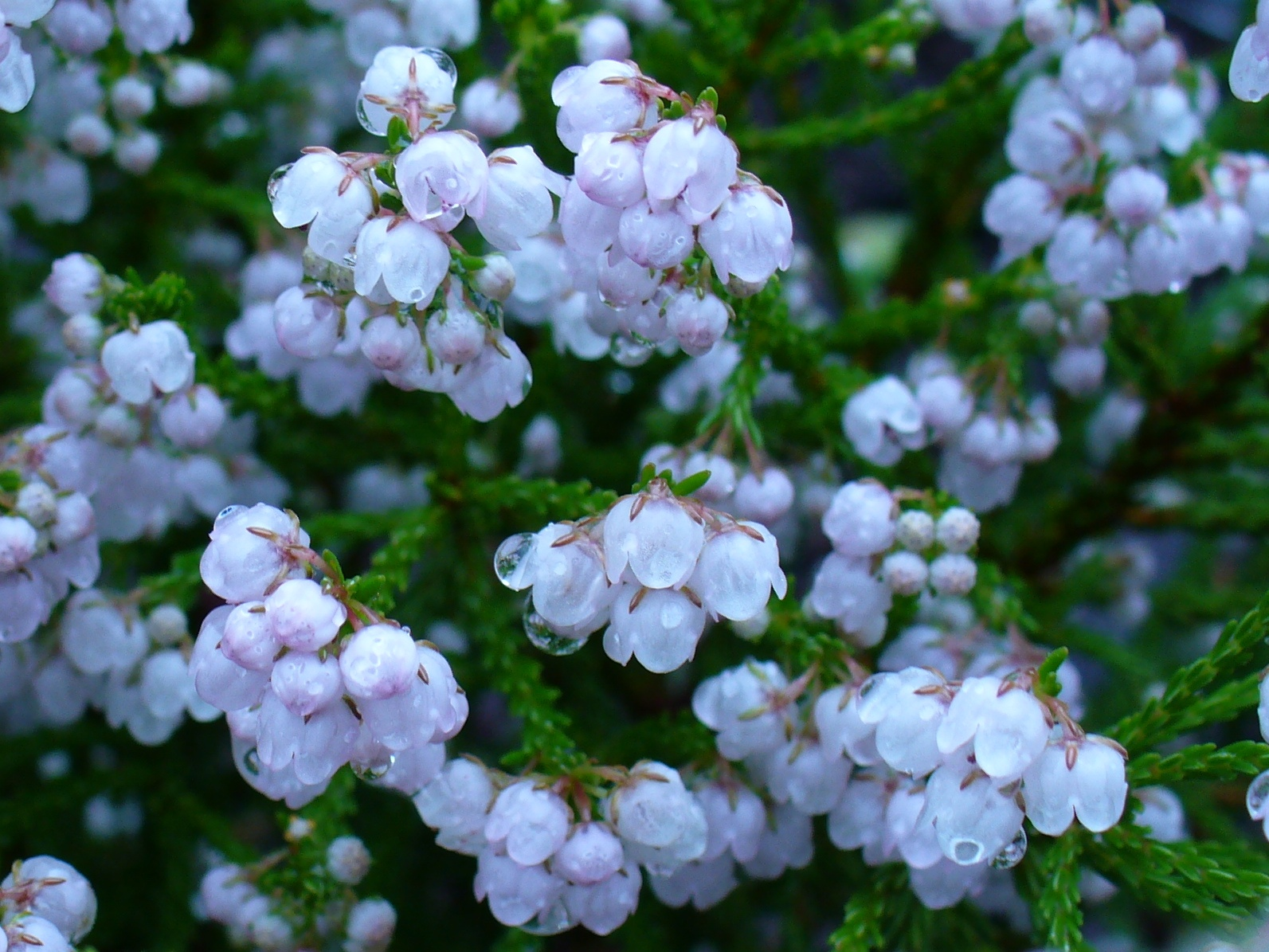

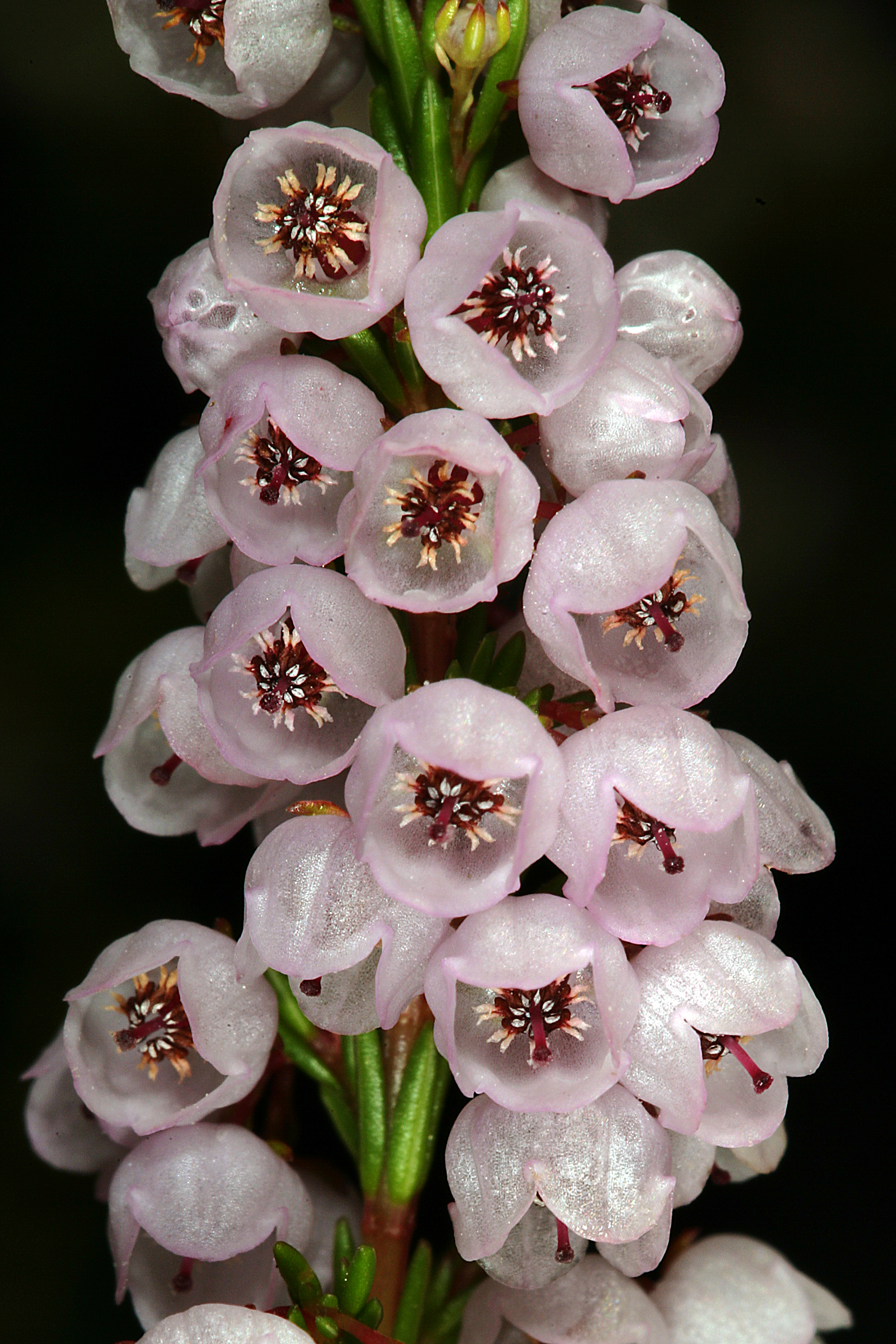

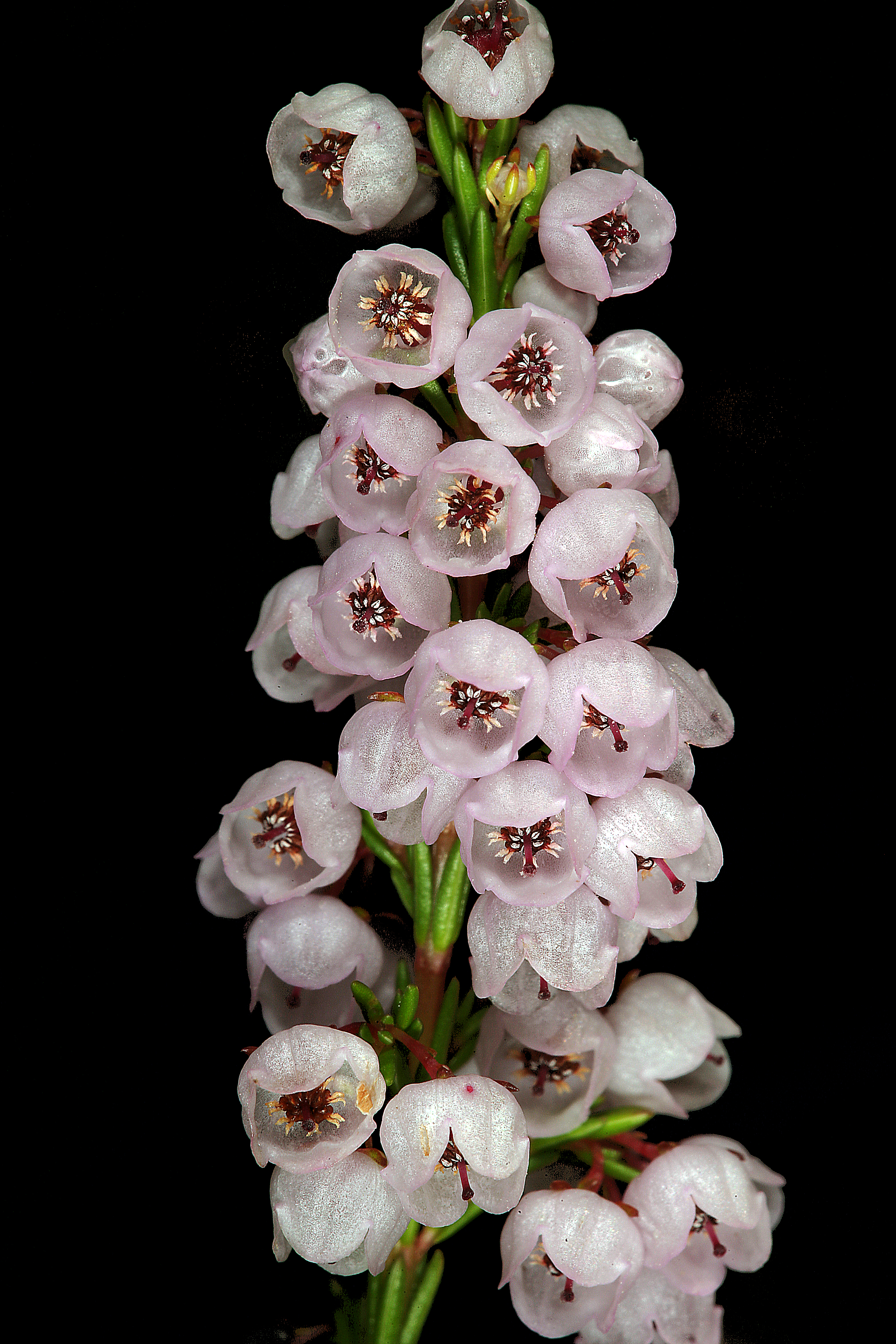

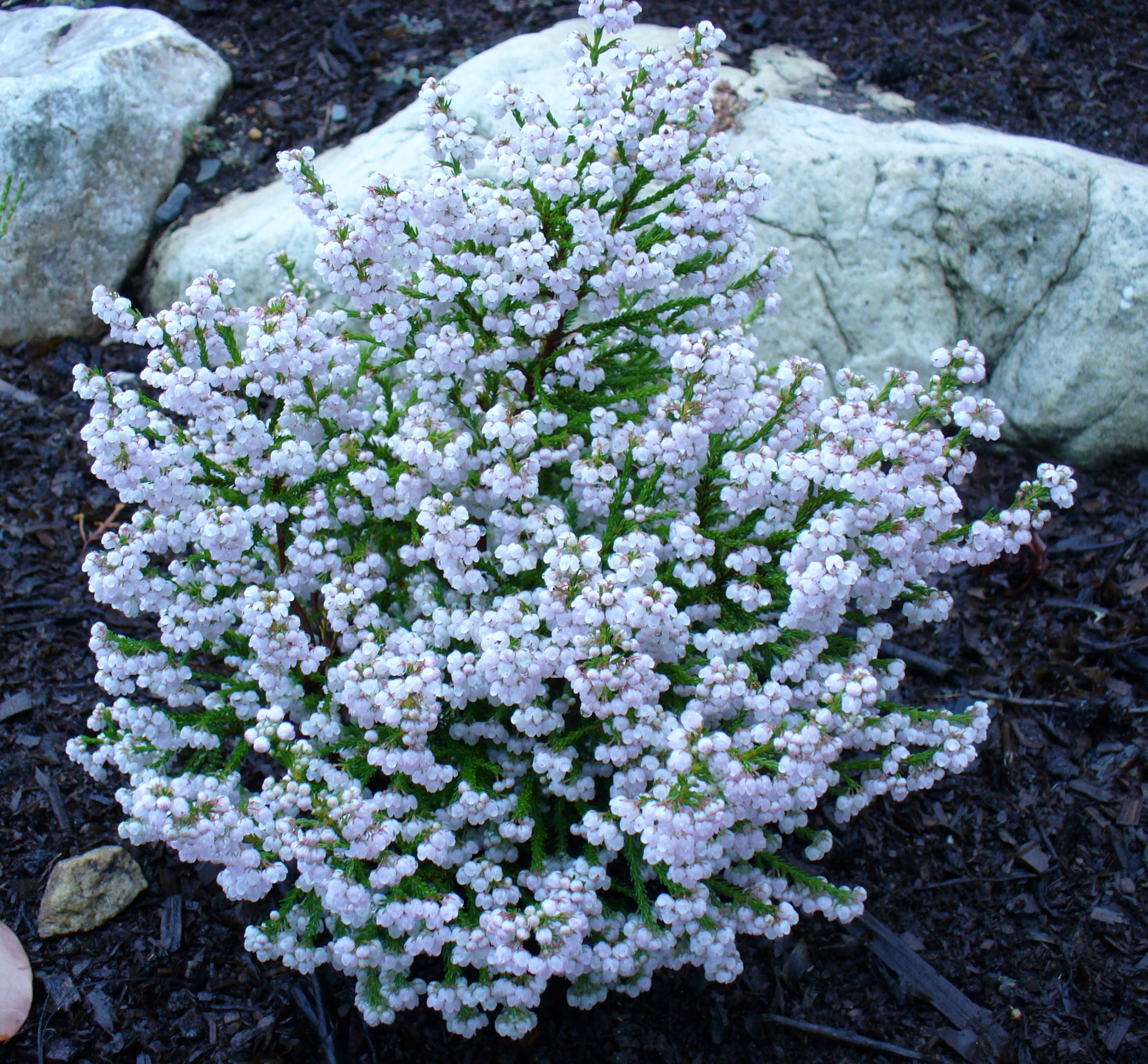
