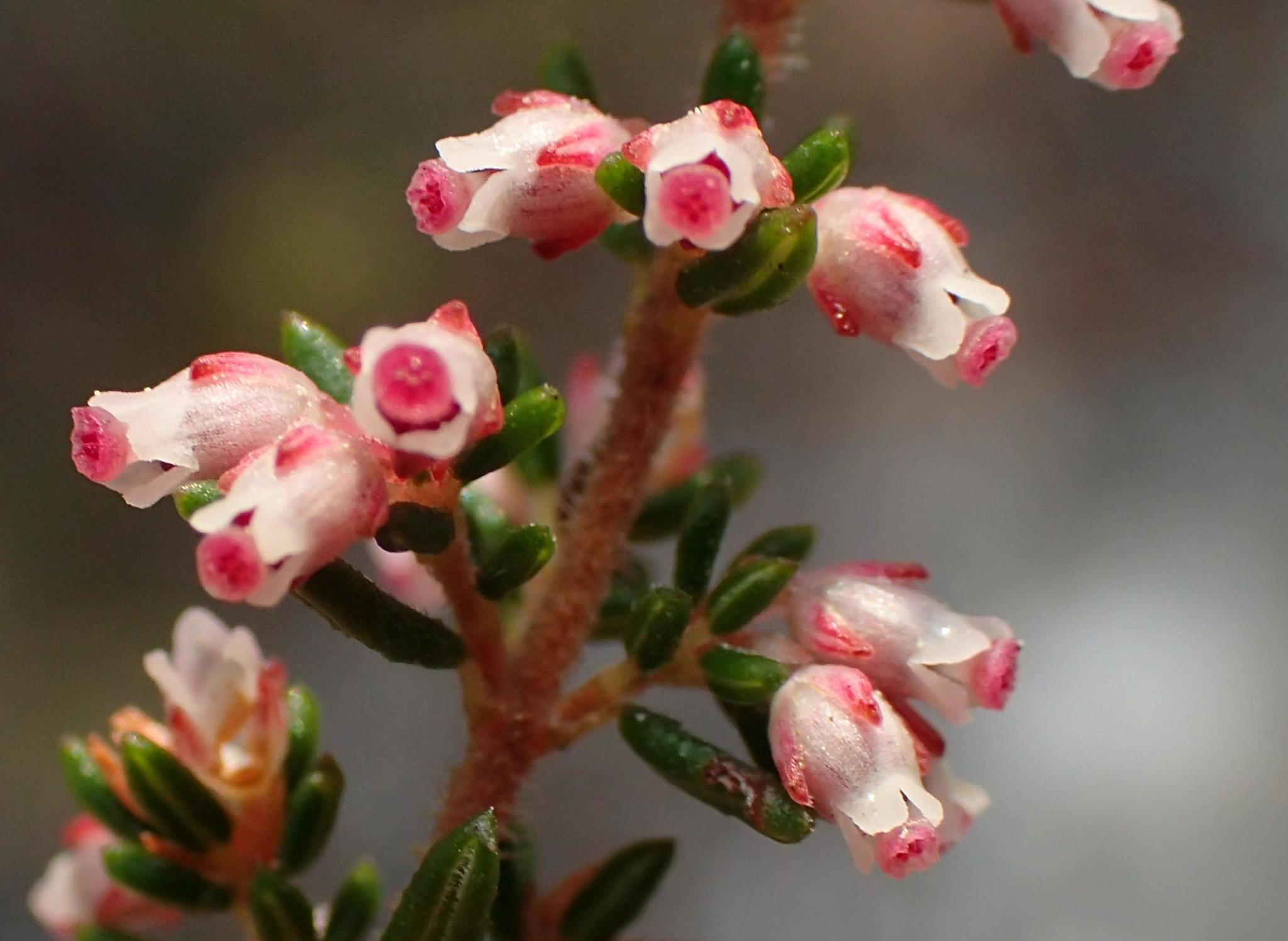

Scientific classification
- Kingdom: Plantae
- Clade: Tracheophytes
- Clade: Angiosperms
- Clade: Eudicots
- Clade: Asterids
- Order: Ericales
- Family: Ericaceae
- Genus: Erica
- Species: E. peltata

Binomial name
- Erica peltata Andrews

= Erica peltata =

Species of flowering plant

Erica peltata (the ker-ker heath or raasheath) is a species of Erica heath endemic to the fynbos region of the Western Cape Province, South Africa.

== Description ==
It is an erect shrub which flowers in late summer (December to April). The numerous flowers are small (2 mm long) and reddish-pink, with a cup-shaped corolla.

== Distribution ==
This species occurs on the south-facing hills and lower mountains slopes from Riviersonderend in the west, around Swellendam, Heidelberg and Riversdale, to George and Humansdorp in the east.
