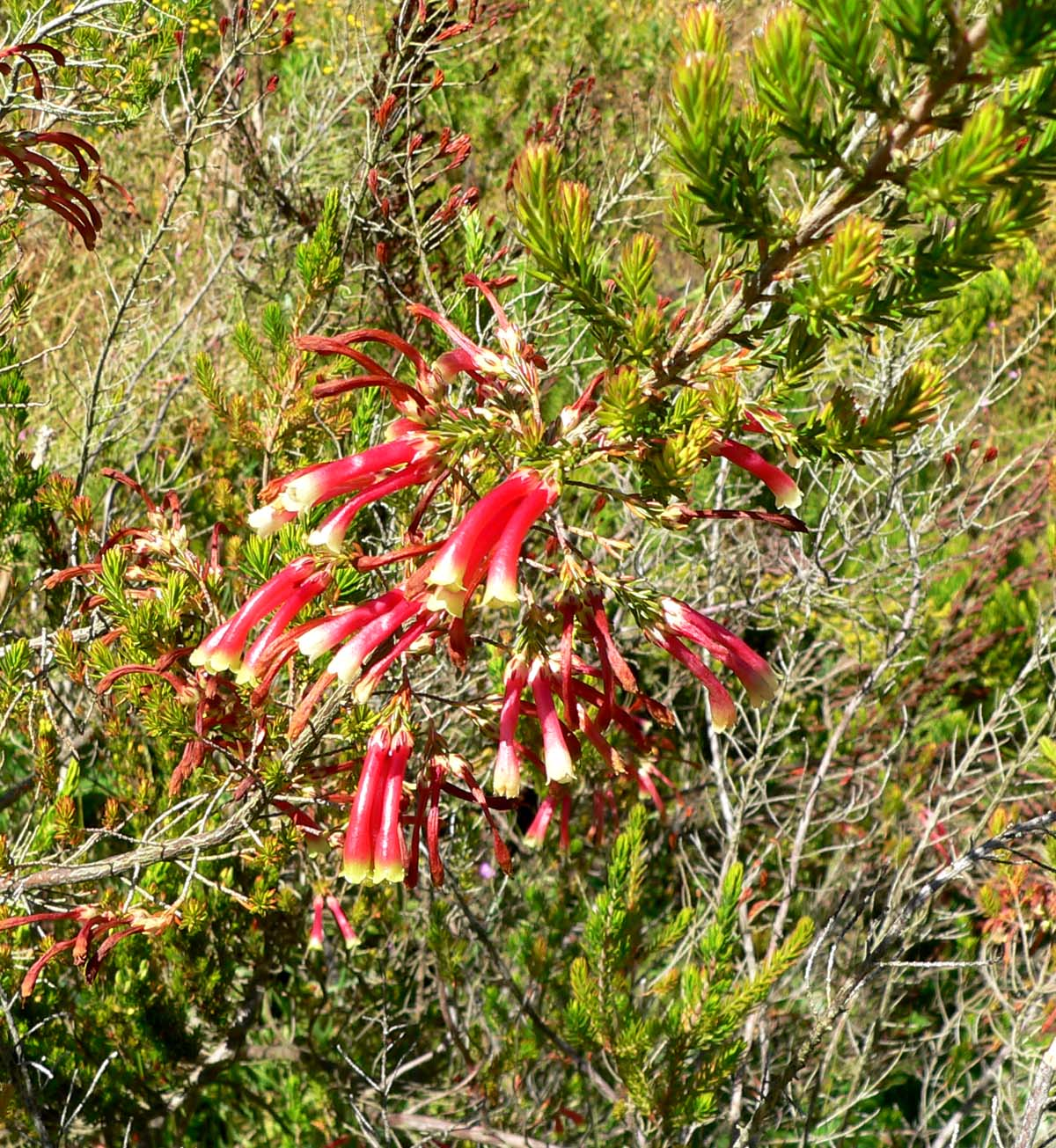
- San Francisco Botanical Garden

Scientific classification
- Kingdom: Plantae
- Clade: Tracheophytes
- Clade: Angiosperms
- Clade: Eudicots
- Clade: Asterids
- Order: Ericales
- Family: Ericaceae
- Genus: Erica
- Species: E. versicolor

Binomial name
- Erica versicolor Andrews

= Erica versicolor =

Species of flowering plant

Erica versicolor is a species of flowering plant in the family Ericaceae, native to South Africa's Cape Province.

In cultivation E. versicolor requires well-drained acidic soil and a sheltered situation in full sun. It cannot tolerate freezing temperatures. In the UK it has gained the Royal Horticultural Society's Award of Garden Merit.

== Description ==
Erica versicolor is an evergreen shrub growing to 3 m (9.8 ft) tall by 1 m (3.3 ft) broad, bearing tiny needle-like leaves and long tubular flowers up to 3 cm (1.2 in) in length. The flowers have a two-tone appearance, predominantly red with green or yellow tips (hence the Latin specific epithet versicolor), and bloom from October until April. The leaves are trifoliate, smooth, and a deep green. The branches of the plant are nearly simple.

== Gallery ==
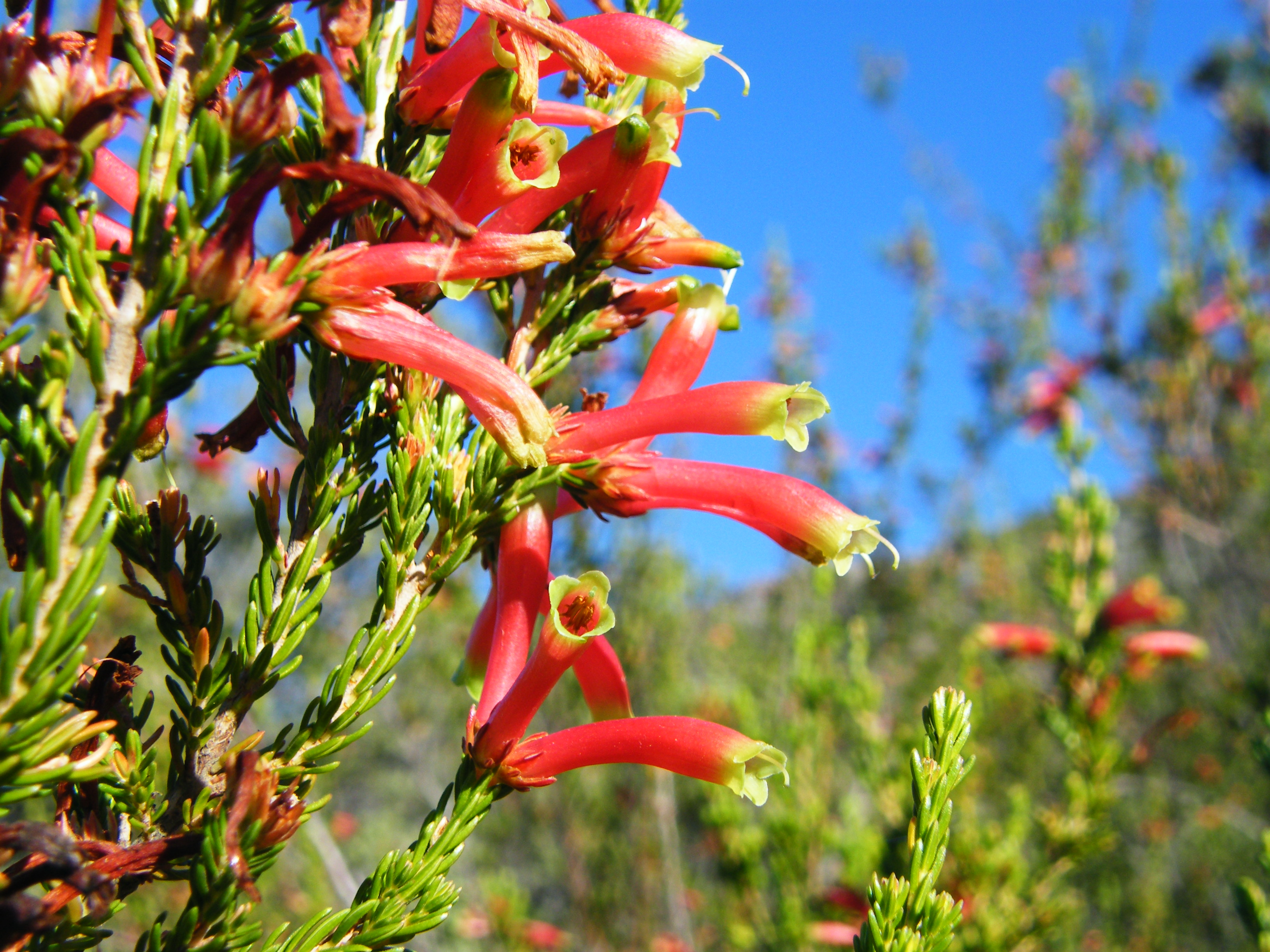
Kirstenbosch National Botanical Garden, Cape Town

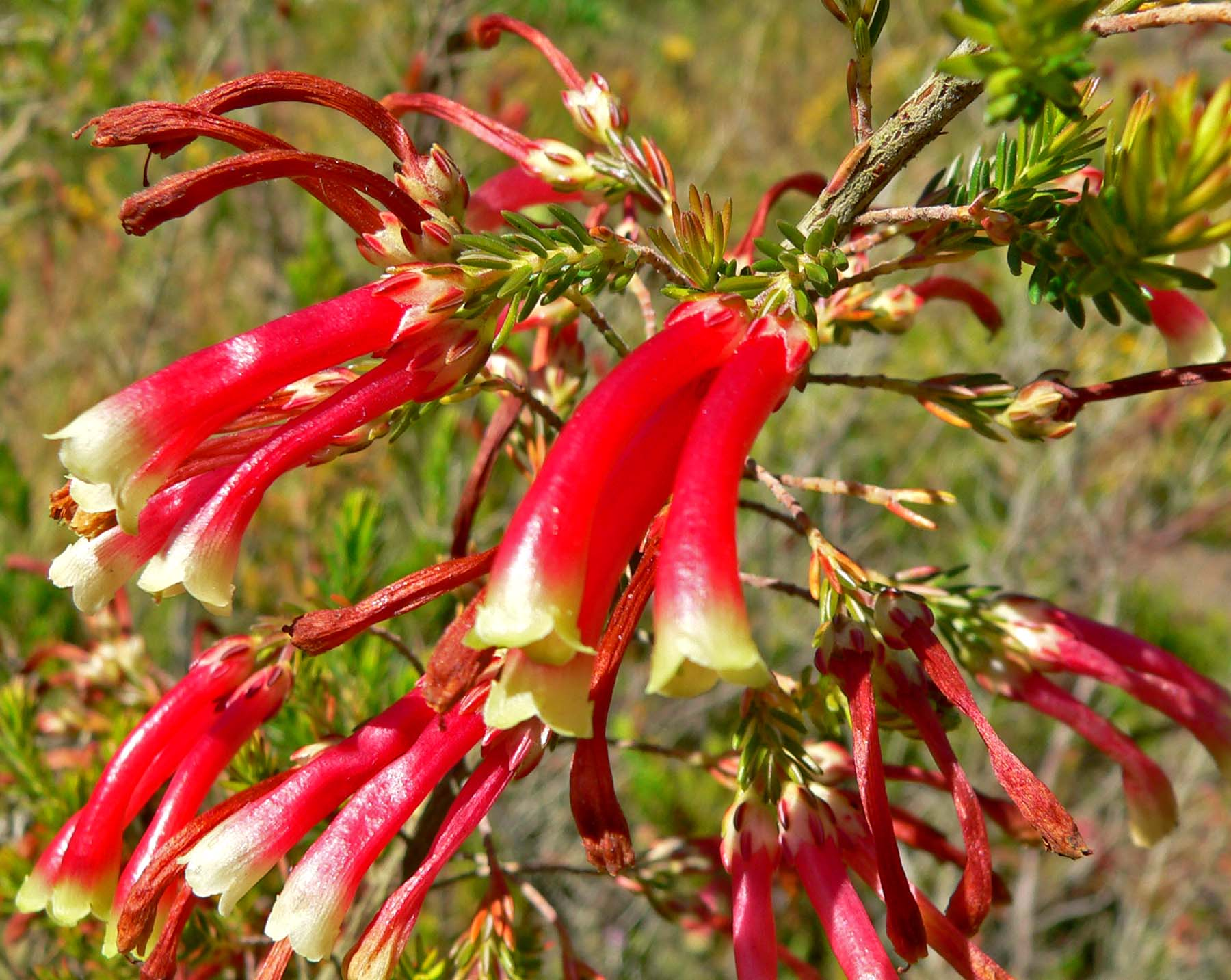
San Francisco Botanical Garden

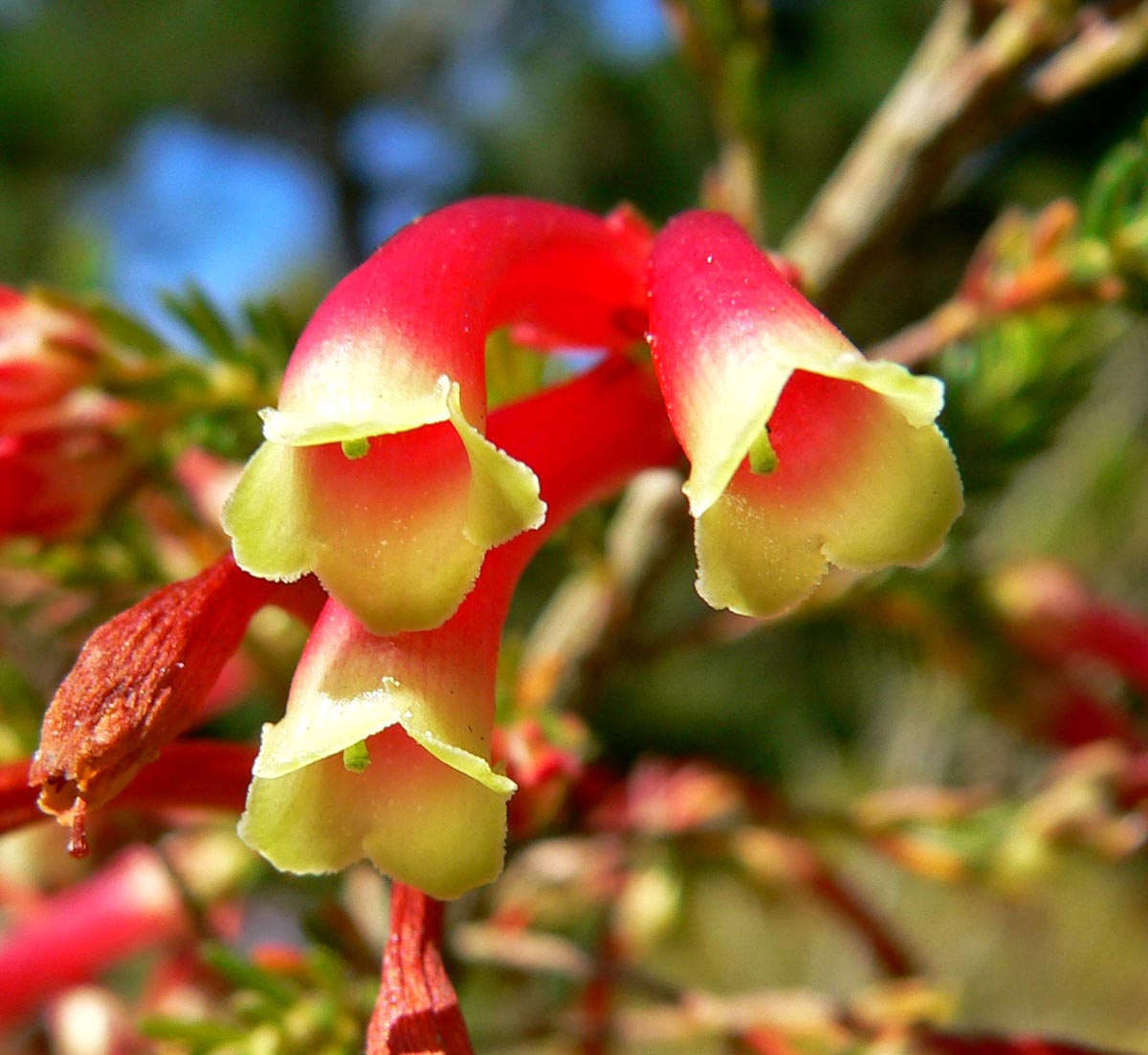
Close-up of flowers
