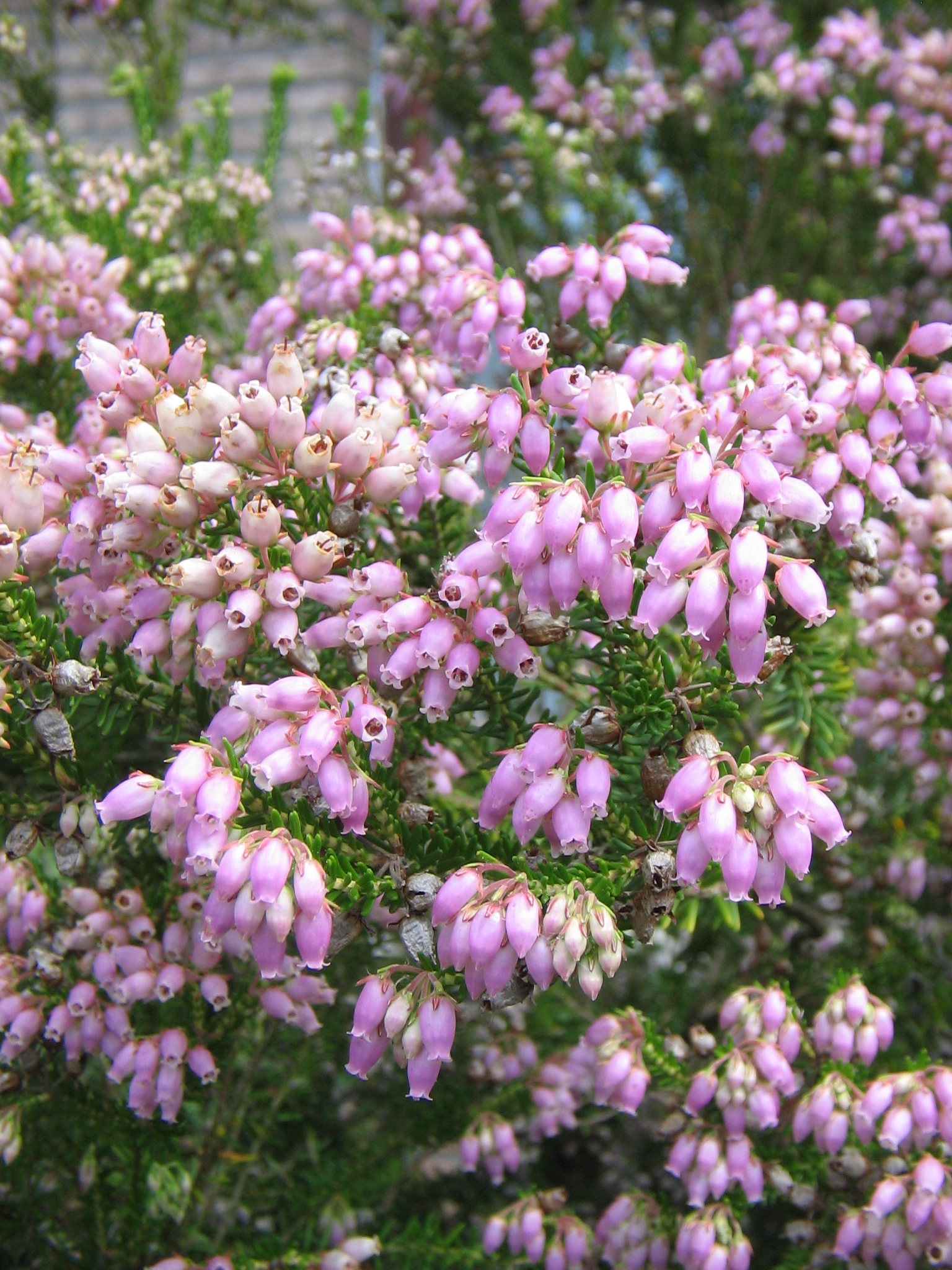

Scientific classification
- Kingdom: Plantae
- Clade: Tracheophytes
- Clade: Angiosperms
- Clade: Eudicots
- Clade: Asterids
- Order: Ericales
- Family: Ericaceae
- Genus: Erica
- Species: E. terminalis

Binomial name
- Erica terminalis Salisb.

= Erica terminalis =

Species of flowering plant

Erica terminalis, the Corsican heath or upright heath, is a European species of flowering plant in the family Ericaceae.

It is a bushy evergreen shrub, sometimes described as a tree heath (a term also applied to E. arborea and E. lusitanica). It grows to 1 metre (3 1/2 feet) tall and wide, with mid-green leaves and rose-pink flowers in summer and autumn, which often persist on the plant well into winter. E. terminalis can grow well on limey soils.

It is native to southern Europe and northern Africa, and naturalised elsewhere.
