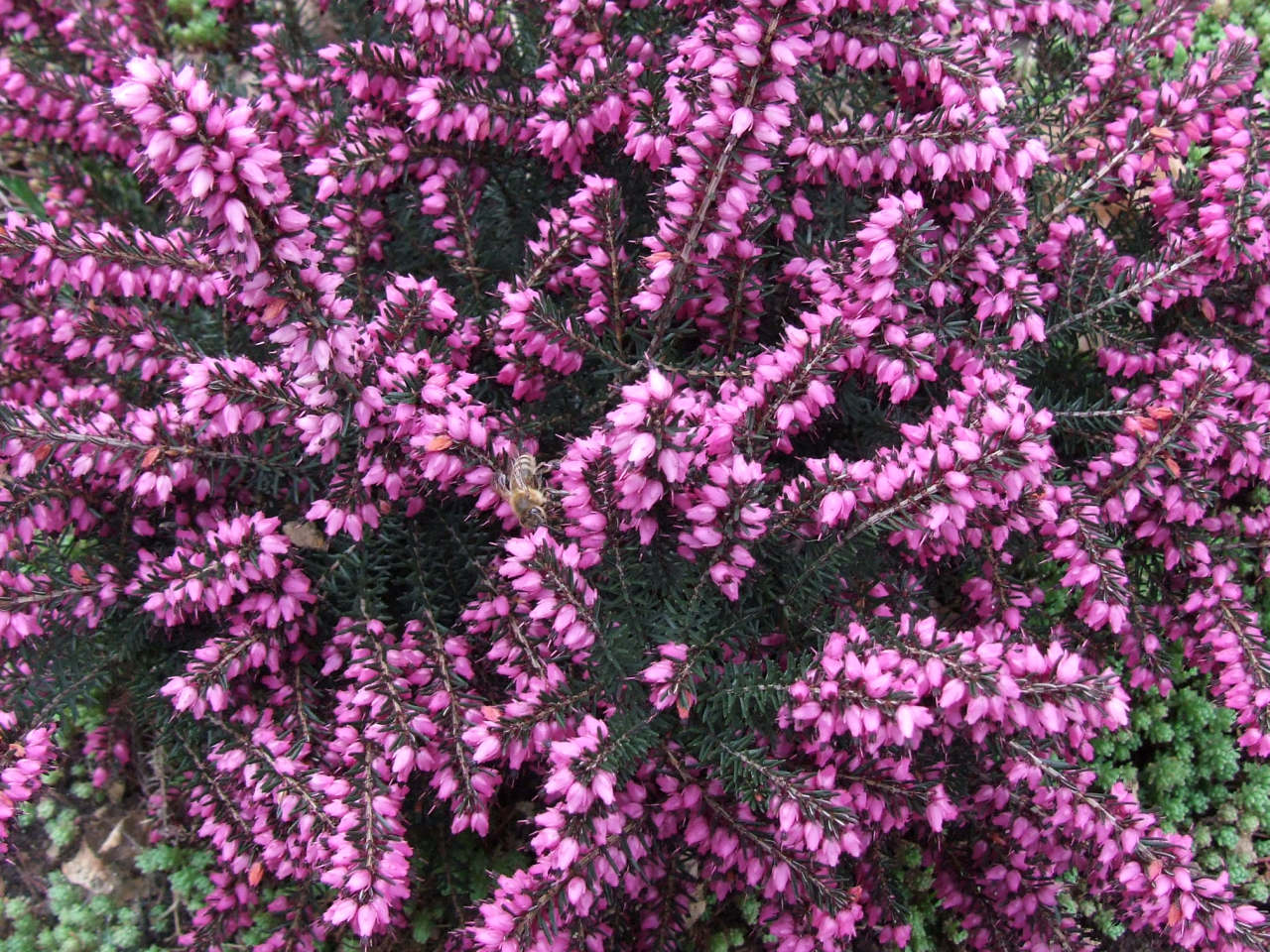
- 'Kramer's Rote' (cultivar)

Scientific classification
- Kingdom: Plantae
- Clade: Tracheophytes
- Clade: Angiosperms
- Clade: Eudicots
- Clade: Asterids
- Order: Ericales
- Family: Ericaceae
- Genus: Erica
- Species: E. × darleyensis

Binomial name
- Erica × darleyensis Bean

= Erica × darleyensis =

Darley Dale heath

Hybrid species of flowering plant

Erica × darleyensis, the Darley Dale heath, is a plant hybrid between the heathers E. carnea and E. erigena, probably of garden origin.

It is a bushy shrub growing to 60 centimetres (24 inches) tall by 75 cm (30 in) broad, with white to rose-pink urn-shaped flowers in late winter and early spring.

Unlike some plants in this genus, it has no particular requirement for acid soil and grows in all soil types. It requires sharp drainage in full sun. It is especially suitable as groundcover, for instance as an underplanting for conifers.

The seedling was found in a nursery in Darley Dale, Derbyshire, UK, prior to 1900. It has given rise to a large number of cultivars, and the following have gained the Royal Horticultural Society's Award of Garden Merit:

- E. × darleyensis 'Arthur Johnson'
- E. × darleyensis 'Furzey'
- E. × darleyensis 'Ghost Hills'
- E. × darleyensis 'J.W. Porter'
- E. × darleyensis 'Jenny Porter'
- E. × darleyensis 'Kramer's Rote'
- E. × darleyensis f. albiflora 'White Perfection'
