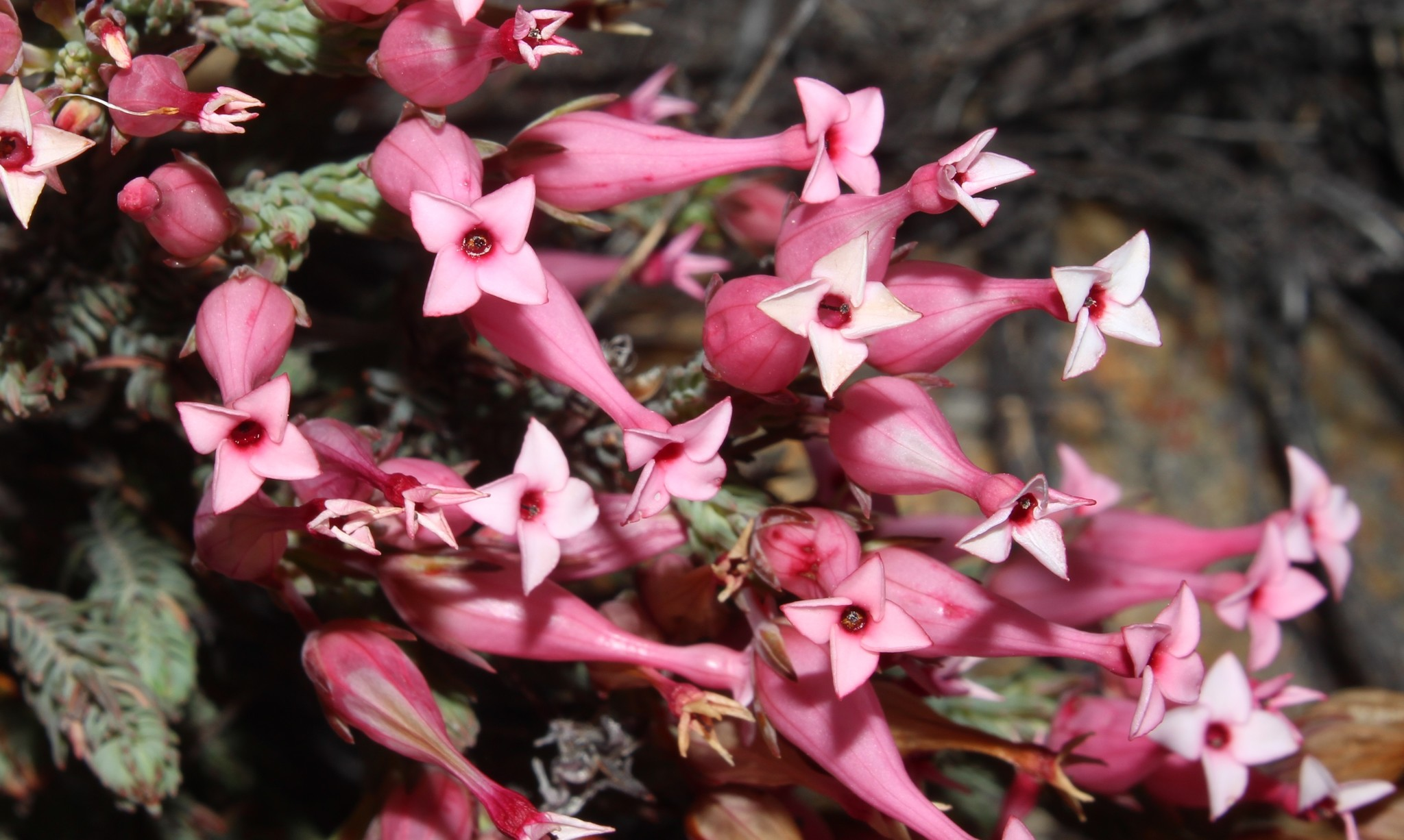

Scientific classification
- Kingdom: Plantae
- Clade: Tracheophytes
- Clade: Angiosperms
- Clade: Eudicots
- Clade: Asterids
- Order: Ericales
- Family: Ericaceae
- Genus: Erica
- Species: E. junonia

Binomial name
- Erica junonia Bolus (1894)

= Erica junonia =

Species of flowering plant

Erica junonia is a plant that belongs to the genus Erica and is part of the fynbos. The species is endemic to the Western Cape and occurs in the Skurweberg in the Koue Bokkeveld near Ceres. The plant's habitat is threatened by the high incidence of wildfires, droughts and invasive plants.
