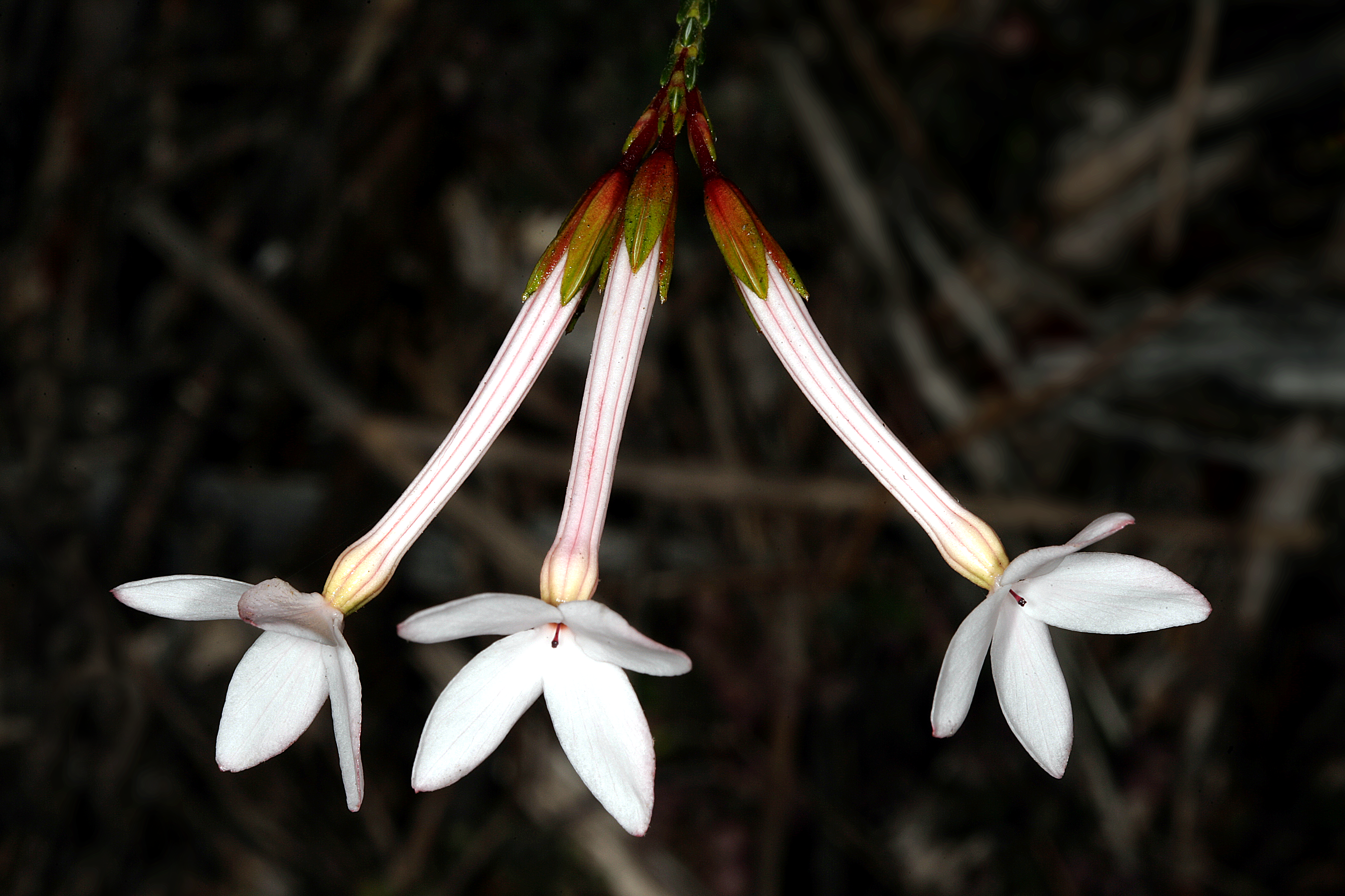

Scientific classification
- Kingdom: Plantae
- Clade: Tracheophytes
- Clade: Angiosperms
- Clade: Eudicots
- Clade: Asterids
- Order: Ericales
- Family: Ericaceae
- Genus: Erica
- Species: E. jasminiflora

Binomial name
- Erica jasminiflora Salisb.

= Erica jasminiflora =

Jasmine Heath

Species of flowering plant

Erica jasminiflora, the jasmine heath, is an endangered species of Erica, native to South Africa.

It is a small shrub around 60 centimetres (24 inches) high, with thin, spindly branches, which are shrouded in reduced and flat leaves. Blooming from November to March at the end of the branches are inflorescences of three or four tubular-shaped flowers. The star-shaped corolla look similar to jasmine and are sticky. The colour of the corolla ranges from white to pale pink with darker pink veins.

The species grows on iron-rich soils on underlying shale-derived clay, and recovers effectively from wildfires. Agriculture is the major threat to its existence, having reduced its number of plants to around 100 in a small area in the Swartberg, Western Cape.

The main pollinators are flies in the families Tabanidae and Nemestrinidae. Other insects that damage the flower and take its the nectar are deterred by a sticky layer on the outside of the flower.
