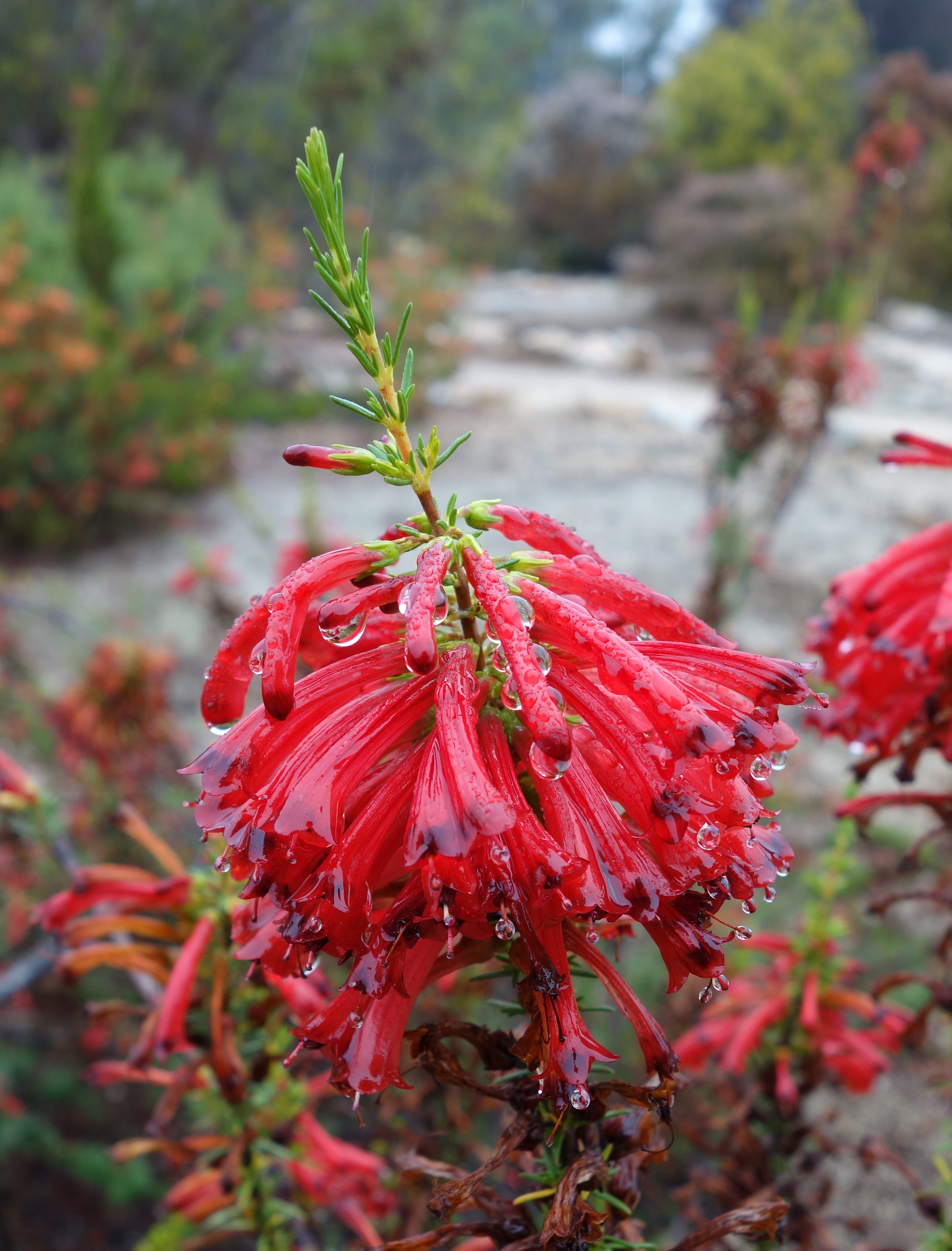

Scientific classification
- Kingdom: Plantae
- Clade: Tracheophytes
- Clade: Angiosperms
- Clade: Eudicots
- Clade: Asterids
- Order: Ericales
- Family: Ericaceae
- Genus: Erica
- Species: E. cruenta

Binomial name
- Erica cruenta Sol.

= Erica cruenta =

Species of flowering plant

Erica cruenta is a species of Erica native to Cape Province, South Africa. It is an erect bush, 2–3 feet high with blood-red flowers.
