= Erica nyassana =

Conservation status
- Vulnerable (IUCN 2.3)

Scientific classification
- Kingdom: Plantae
- Clade: Tracheophytes
- Clade: Angiosperms
- Clade: Eudicots
- Clade: Asterids
- Order: Ericales
- Family: Ericaceae
- Genus: Erica
- Species: E. nyassana

Binomial name
- Erica nyassana Alm & T.C.E.Fr.

Synonyms
- Philippia nyassana

Species of flowering plant

Erica nyassana is a species of plant in the family Ericaceae. It is endemic to Malawi. It is threatened by habitat loss.
