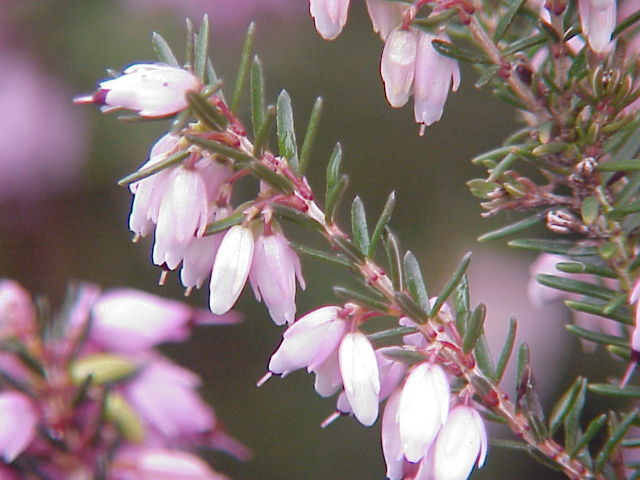
- Erica carnea in flower

Scientific classification
- Kingdom: Plantae
- Clade: Tracheophytes
- Clade: Angiosperms
- Clade: Eudicots
- Clade: Asterids
- Order: Ericales
- Family: Ericaceae
- Subfamily: Ericoideae
- Tribe: Ericeae
- Genus: Erica; L.

Species
- See list of Erica species

Synonyms
- List: Acrostemon Klotzsch; Aniserica (Bartl.) N.E.Br.; Anomalanthus Klotzsch; Apogandrum Neck.; Arachnocalyx Compton; Arsace Fourr.; Blaeria L.; Bruckenthalia Rchb.; Callista D.Don; Ceramia D.Don; Chlorocodon Fourr.; Chona D.Don; Coccosperma Klotzsch; Codonanthemum Klotzsch; Coilostigma Klotzsch; Comacephalus Klotzsch; Dasyanthes D.Don; Desmia D.Don; Ectasis D.Don; Eleutherostemon Klotzsch; Eremia D.Don; Eremiella Compton; Eremiopsis N.E.Br.; Eremocallis Salisb. ex Gray; Ericinella Klotzsch; Ericodes Kuntze; Ericoides Heist. ex Fabr.; Eriodesmia D.Don; Eurylepis D.Don; Euryloma D.Don; Eurystegia D.Don; Finckea Klotzsch; Grisebachia Klotzsch; Gypsocallis Salisb. ex Gray; Hexastemon Klotzsch; Kolbia Adans.; Lagenocarpus Klotzsch; Lamprotis D.Don; Lepterica N.E.Br.; Lophandra D.Don; Lopherina Neck. ex A.Juss.; Macnabia Benth. ex Endl.; Macrolinum Klotzsch; Microtrema Klotzsch; Mitrastylus Alm & T.C.E.Fr.; Nabea Lehm. ex Klotzsch; Nagelocarpus Bullock; Octogonia Klotzsch; Octopera D.Don; Omphalocaryon Klotzsch; Pachycalyx Klotzsch; Pachysa D.Don; Pentapera Klotzsch; Philippia Klotzsch; Pilopus Raf.; Plagiostemon Klotzsch; Platycalyx N.E.Br.; Salaxis Salisb.; Scyphogyne Decne.; Simocheilus Klotzsch; Stokoeanthus E.G.H.Oliv.; Sympieza Licht. ex Roem. & Schult.; Syndesmanthus Klotzsch; Syringodea D.Don; Tetralix Zinn; Thamnium Klotzsch; Thamnus Klotzsch; Thoracosperma Klotzsch; Tristemon Klotzsch

= Erica (plant) =

Genus of flowering plants

Erica is a genus of roughly 857 species of flowering plants in the family Ericaceae. The English common names heath and heather are shared by some closely related genera of similar appearance. The genus Calluna was formerly included in Erica; it differs in having even smaller scale-leaves (less than 2–3 millimetres long), and the flower corolla consisting of separate petals. Erica is sometimes referred to as "winter (or spring) heather" to distinguish it from Calluna "summer (or autumn) heather".

== European species ==
Most European species are dwarf shrubs, growing 20–80 cm (7.9–31.5 in) tall. The largest are the tree heather (Erica arborea) and the broom heather (Erica scoparia), which can reach 6–10 metres (20–33 feet).

== African species ==
The majority of the more than 750 African heather species occur in the Cape fynbos of South Africa growing alongside proteas and other shrubs. Most South African species have long, disc-shaped flowers. In the Afromontane zones of East Africa, heather species that grow to several meters tall, such as Erica arborea and Erica rossii grow.

== Description ==
Most of the species of Erica are small shrubs from 20–150 centimetres (8–59 inches) high, though some are taller; the tallest are E. arborea (tree heath) and E. scoparia (besom heath), both of which can reach up to 7 metres (23 feet) tall. All are evergreen, with minute, needle-like leaves 2–15 millimetres (1/8–5/8 in) long. Flowers are sometimes axillary, and sometimes borne in terminal umbels or spikes, and are usually outward or downward facing. The seeds are very small, and in some species may survive in the soil for decades.

== Taxonomy ==
Dulfer published the last revision of the genus Erica in the 1960s, treating 605 species. Many new species have subsequently been described (particularly in South Africa) and a further 83 have been included in Erica from former "minor genera", such as Phillipia Klotzsch and Blaeria L. A more recent overview of Erica species is provided in an electronic identification aid, but a modern taxonomic revision of the genus as a whole is still lacking.

=== Phylogeny ===
A number of increasingly detailed phylogenetic hypotheses for Erica have been published based on nuclear ribosomal and plastid DNA sequences. The closest relatives of Erica are Daboecia (one or two species) and Calluna (monospecific), representing the oldest surviving lineages of a, by inference, ancestrally Palearctic tribe Ericeae. The small number of European Erica species represent the oldest lineages of the genus, within which a single, order-of-magnitude more species-rich, African clade is nested. Within the African clade, Cape and Madagascan/Mascarene species respectively represent monophyletic groups.

=== Species ===
Selected species include:

- Erica abietina
- Erica afra
- Erica arborea
- Erica australis
- Erica azorica
- Erica baccans
- Erica cabernetea
- Erica canaliculata
- Erica capensis
- Erica carnea
- Erica cerinthoides
- Erica ciliaris
- Erica cinerea
- Erica comorensis
- Erica cruenta
- Erica × darleyensis
- Erica erigena
- Erica grandiflora
- Erica haematocodon
- Erica hirtiflora
- Erica jasminiflora
- Erica lusitanica
- Erica mackayana
- Erica mammosa
- Erica manipuliflora
- Erica margaritacea
- Erica mollis
- Erica multiflora
- Erica nana
- Erica nyassana
- Erica patersonia
- Erica peltata
- Erica plukenetii
- Erica pyramidalis
- Erica recurvata
- Erica reunionensis
- Erica rossii
- Erica scoparia
- Erica spiculifolia
- Erica terminalis
- Erica tetralix
- Erica turgida
- Erica urna-viridis
- Erica vagans
- Erica ventricosa
- Erica versicolor
- Erica verticillata
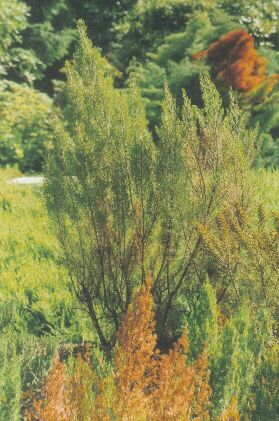
Erica arborea

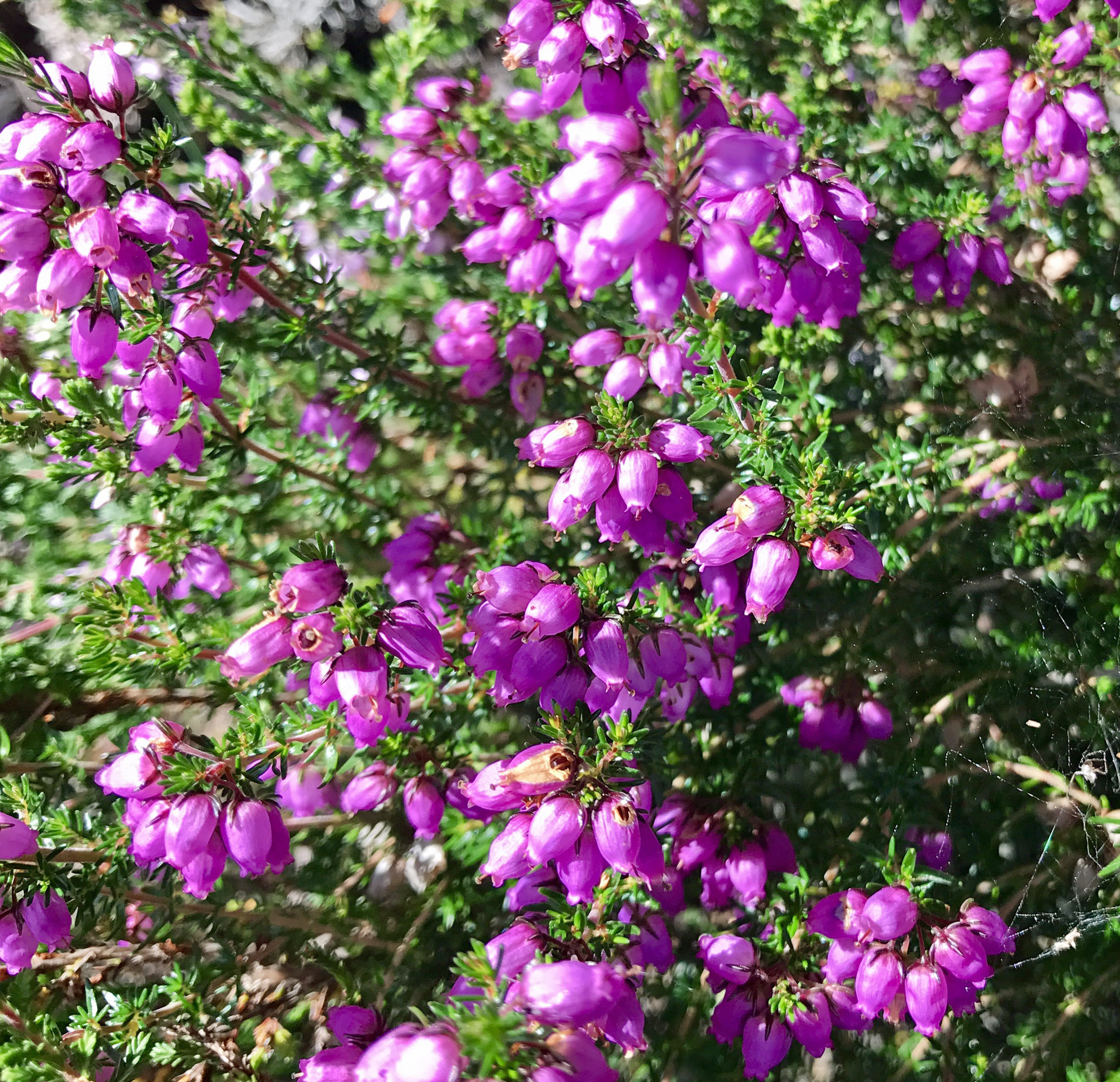
Erica cinerea

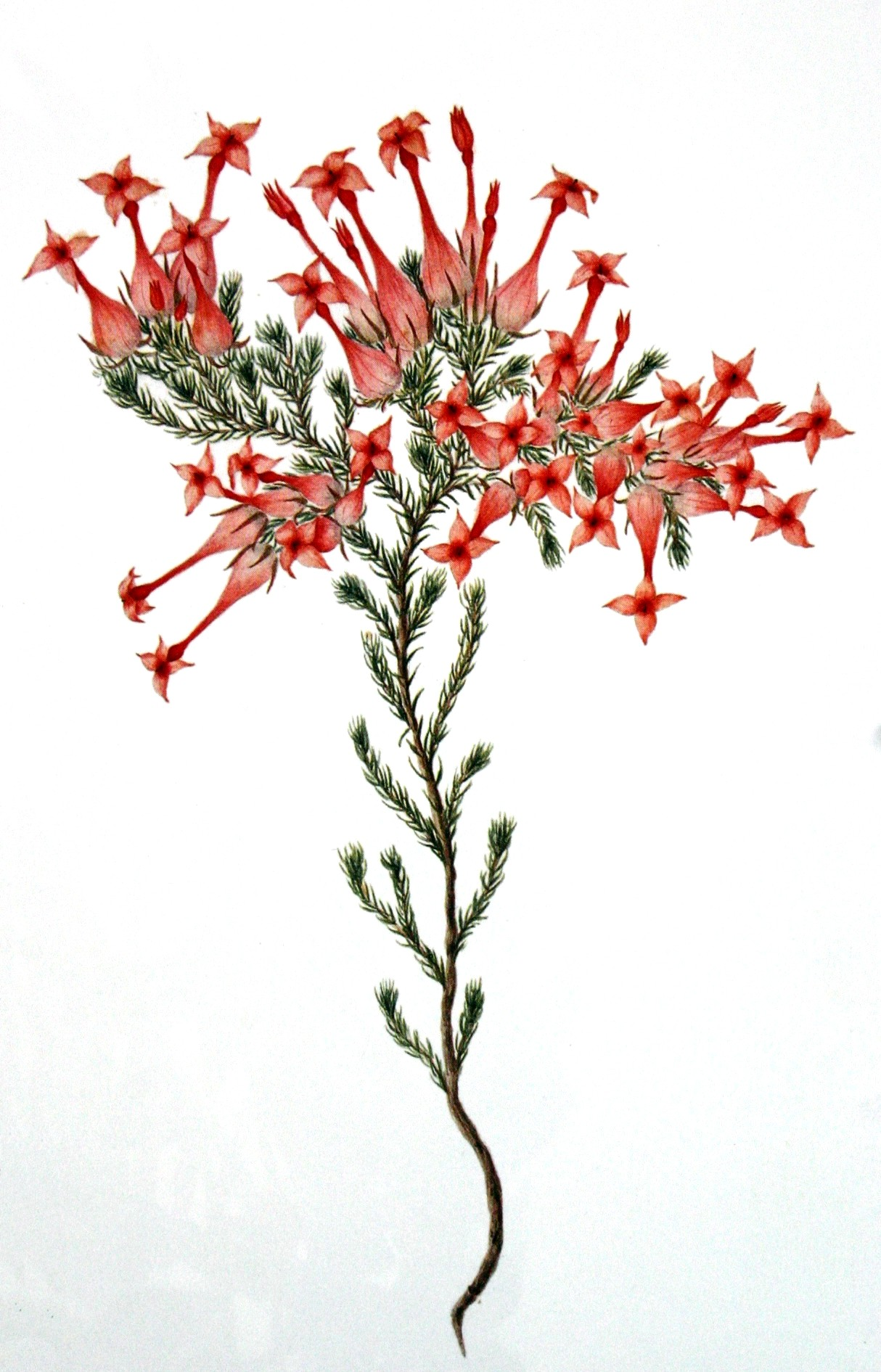
Erica junonia

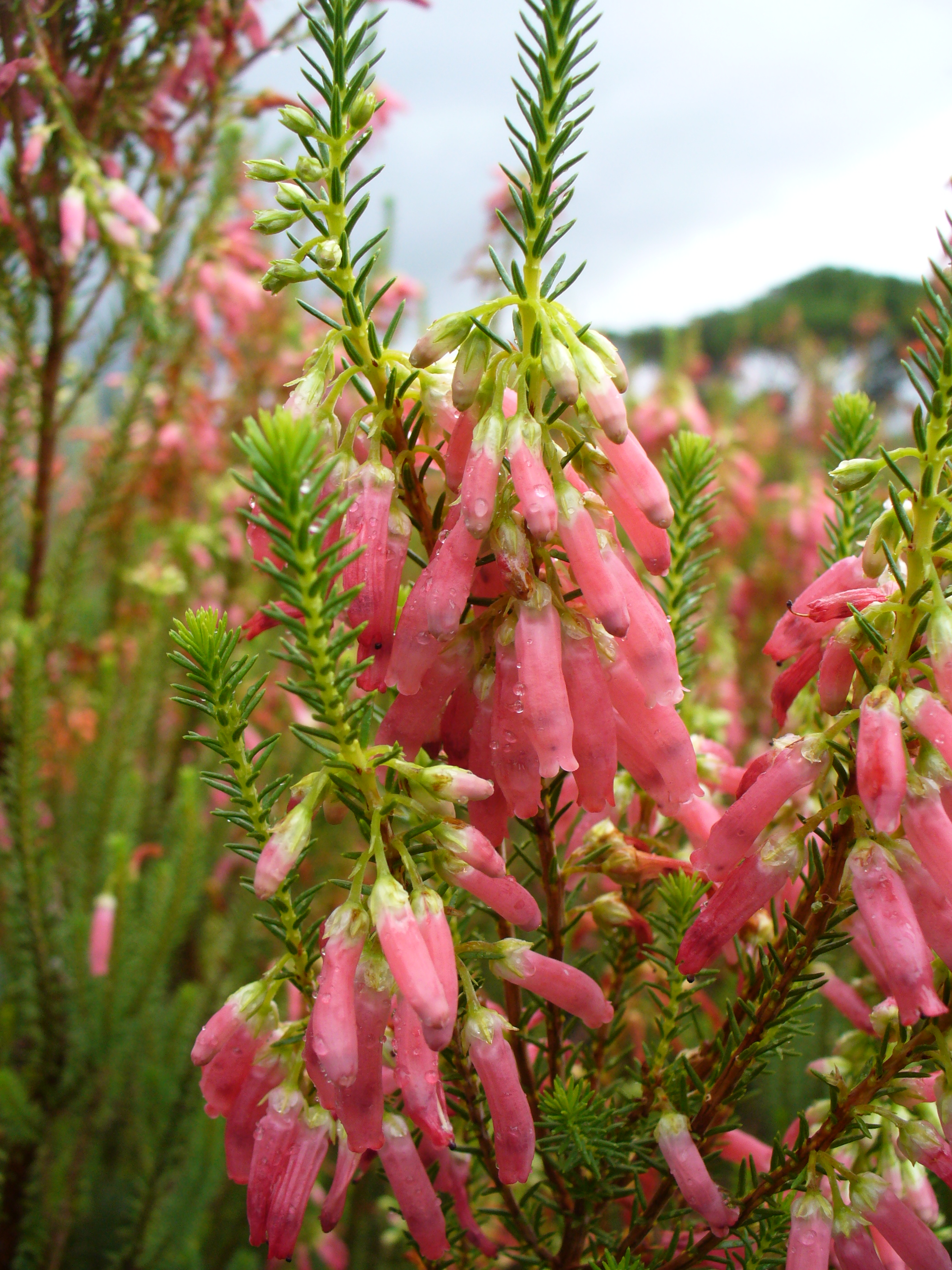
Erica mammosa

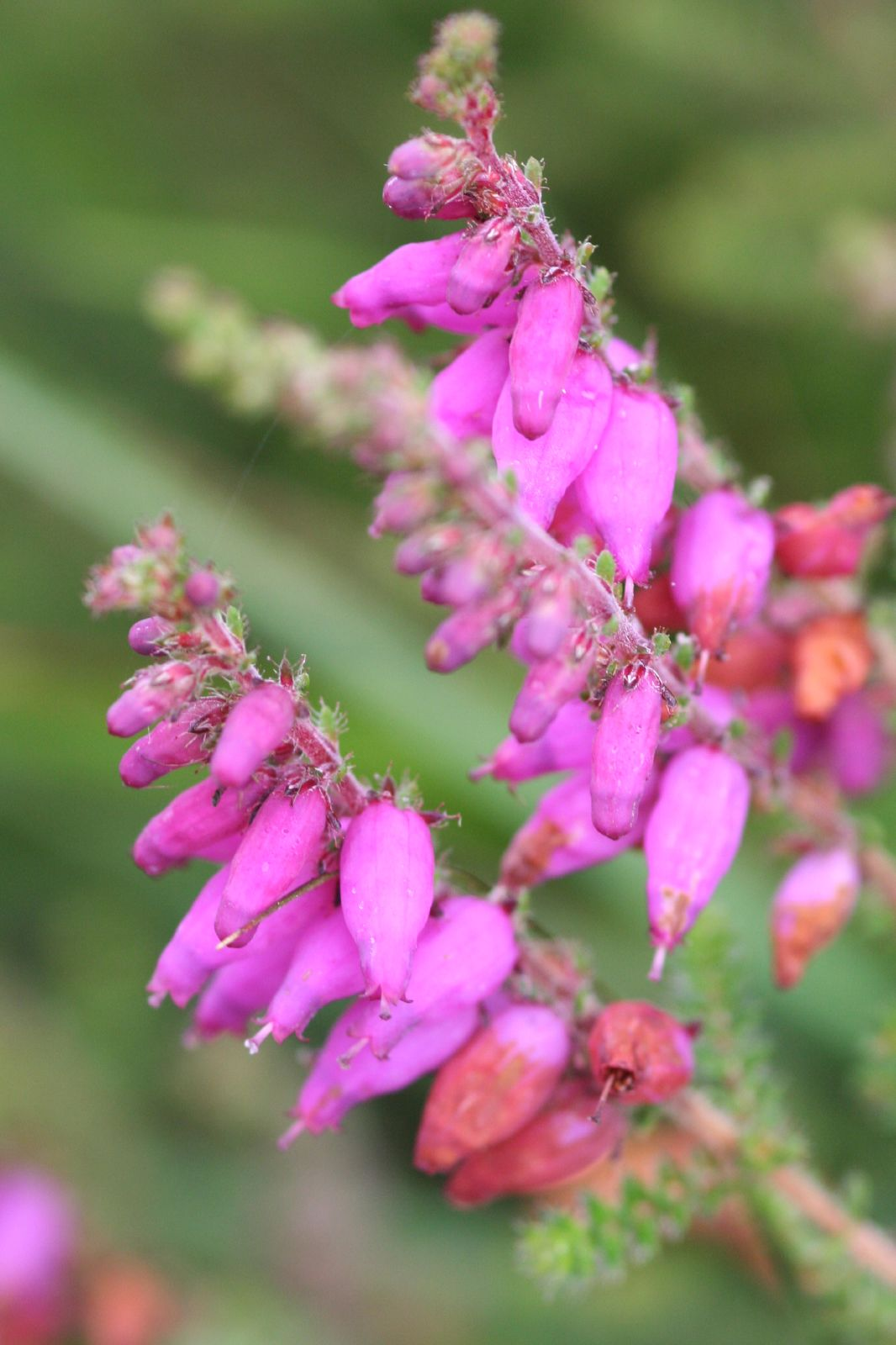
Erica ciliaris

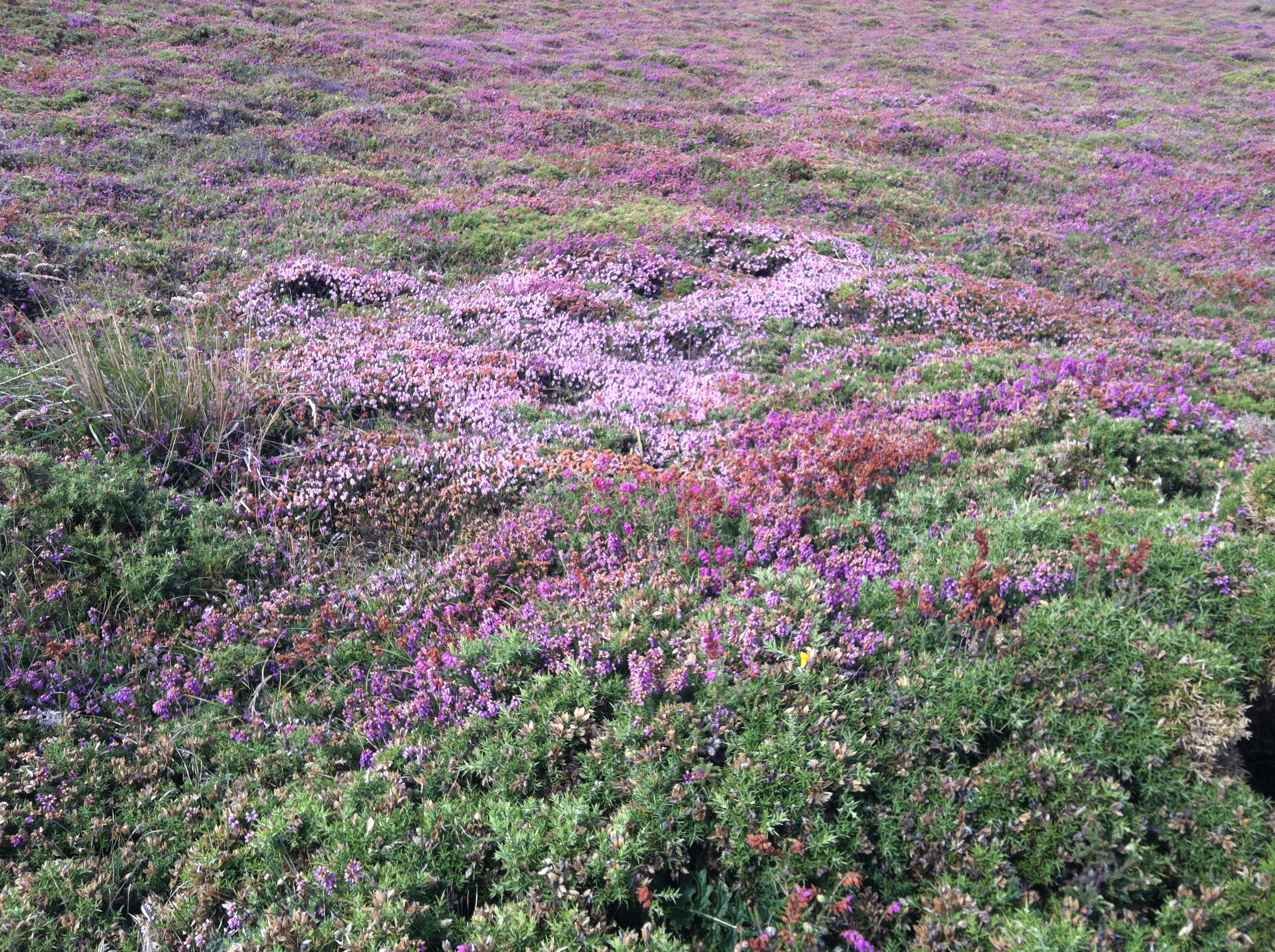
Heather fields in Ortegal (Galicia, Spain)

=== Etymology ===
The Latin word erica means "heath" or "broom". It is believed that Pliny adapted erica from Ancient Greek ἐρείκη ereíkē. The expected Anglo-Latin pronunciation, /ɪˈraɪkə/, may be given in dictionaries (OED: "Erica"), but /ˈɛrɪkə/ is more commonly heard.

== Distribution and habitat ==
Around 690 of the species are endemic to South Africa, and these are often called the Cape heaths, forming the largest genus in the fynbos. The remaining species are native to other parts of Africa, Madagascar, the Mediterranean, and Europe.

Like most Ericaceae, Erica species are mainly calcifuges, being limited to acidic or very acidic soils. In fact, the term "ericaceous" is frequently applied to all calcifuges, and to the compost used in their cultivation. Soils range from dry, sandy soils to extremely wet ones such as bog. They often dominate dwarf-shrub habitats (heathland and moorland), or the ground vegetation of open acidic woodland.

== Ecology ==
Plants of this genus are eaten mainly by the larvae of many Lepidoptera species, including Saturnia pavonia, garden tiger moth, true lover's knot, wormwood pug, the silver-studded blue, and the Coleophora case-bearers C. juncicolella and C. pyrrhulipennella.

Some species of sunbirds are known to visit and pollinate Erica. Two such species are the southern double-collared sunbird and the orange-breasted sunbird.

== Cultivation ==
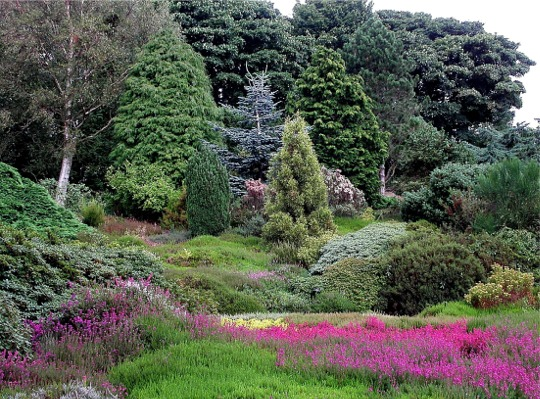
Heather Garden, Ness Botanic Gardens

Erica species are grown as landscape or garden plants for their floral effect. They associate well with conifers and are frequently seen in planting schemes as massed ground cover beneath varieties of dwarf conifers. They are capable of producing flower colour throughout the year. They can also be grown in tubs or window boxes to provide interest through autumn and into winter. Traces of Erica pollen were found on the banks of Arno near Florence dating from Roman times indicating an intended cultivation as building material or river bank management

The cultivation of larger beds of heath rather than individual plants became more popular in the 1920s, after gardeners began to try and replicate natural heathland environments in their gardens.
