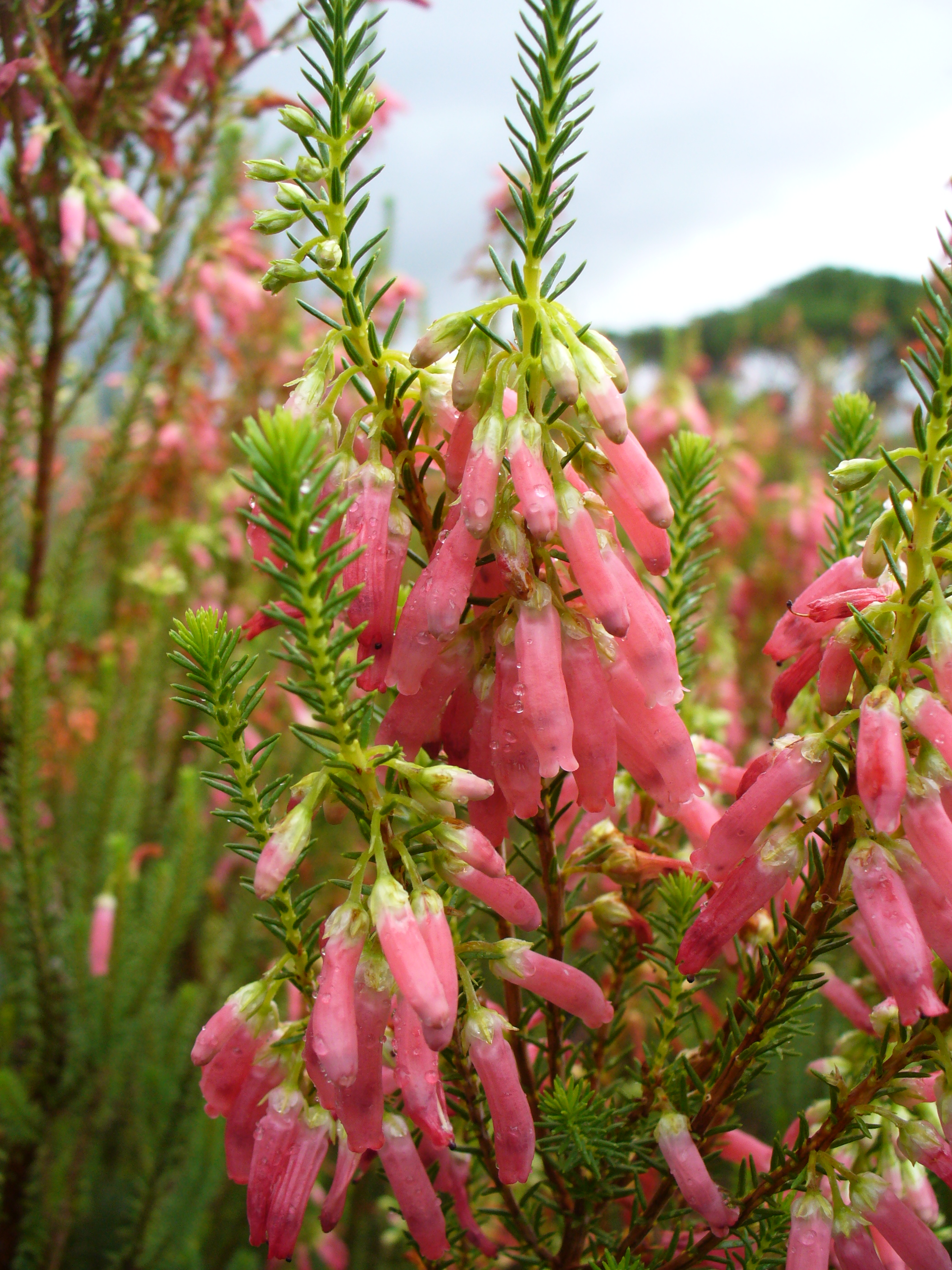

Scientific classification
- Kingdom: Plantae
- Clade: Tracheophytes
- Clade: Angiosperms
- Clade: Eudicots
- Clade: Asterids
- Order: Ericales
- Family: Ericaceae
- Genus: Erica
- Species: E. mammosa

Binomial name
- Erica mammosa L.

= Erica mammosa =

Species of flowering plant

Erica mammosa, the nine-pin heath, is a species of flowering plant in the family Ericaceae, that is naturally restricted to the southwestern corner of the Western Cape, South Africa.

It is a shrub, growing to 2.5 metres (8 feet) tall and broad, that produces masses of flowers in a range of colours from light-pink to orange to bright red.

The species name mammosa means "with breasts" and refers to the udder-like tubular shape of the flowers.

This plant is found as an ornamental garden subject. In the UK it has gained the Royal Horticultural Society's Award of Garden Merit. Like many heathers it is a calcifuge, meaning that it must be grown in an acidic soil. It requires a sunny, sheltered spot with sharp drainage. It tolerates low temperatures down to 0 °C (32 °F), but will not stand freezing.

== Gallery ==
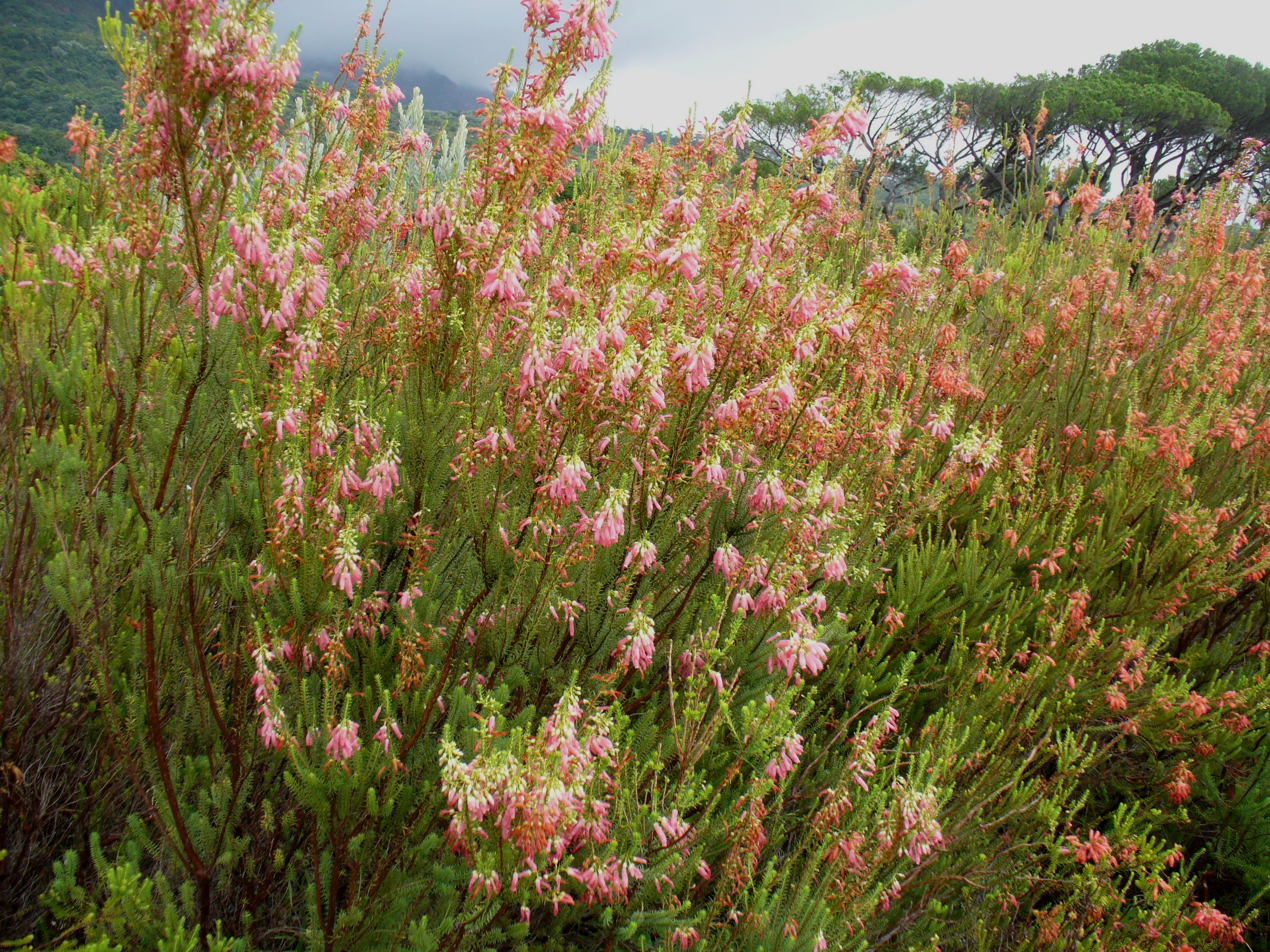

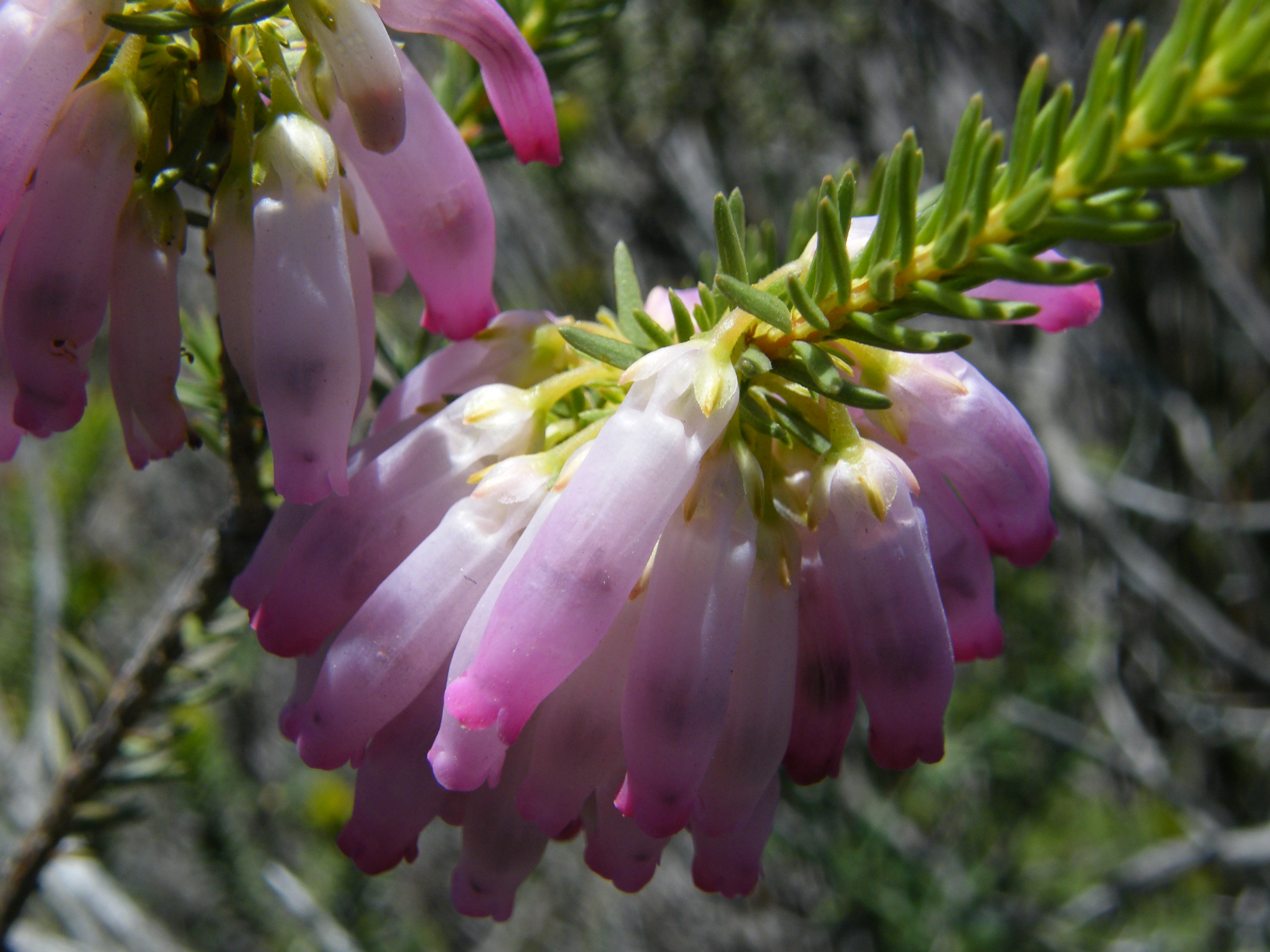
