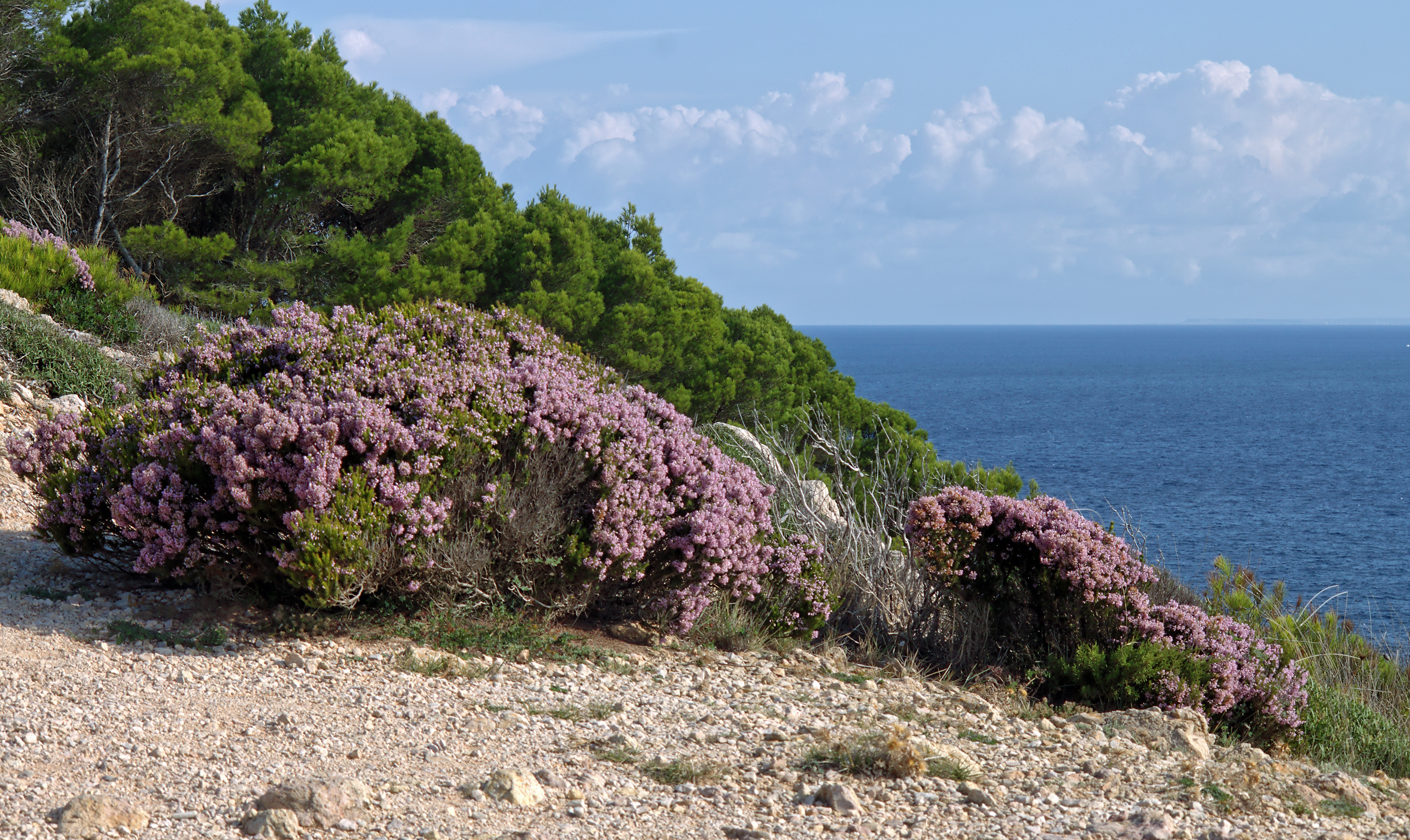

Scientific classification
- Kingdom: Plantae
- Clade: Tracheophytes
- Clade: Angiosperms
- Clade: Eudicots
- Clade: Asterids
- Order: Ericales
- Family: Ericaceae
- Genus: Erica
- Species: E. multiflora

Binomial name
- Erica multiflora L.

Synonyms
- List: Ericoides multiflora (L.) Kuntze; Erica dianthera Moench; Erica multiflora var. alba Regel; Erica multiflora f. alba (Regel) D.C.McClint.; Erica multiflora proles albiflora Sennen; Erica multiflora proles carneiflora Sennen; Erica multiflora var. densifoliata Sennen; Erica multiflora var. gatini Sennen; Erica multiflora subsp. hyblaea Domina & Raimondo; Erica peduncularis C.Presl; Erica purpurascens Lam.; Erica umbellifera Loisel.; Erica vagans Desf.; Gypsocallis multiflora D.Don

= Erica multiflora =

Species of flowering plant

Erica multiflora is a species of flowering plant in the family Ericaceae. It is native to the Mediterranean Basin. It is a shrub which can grow up to 2.5 m (8 ft) tall.
