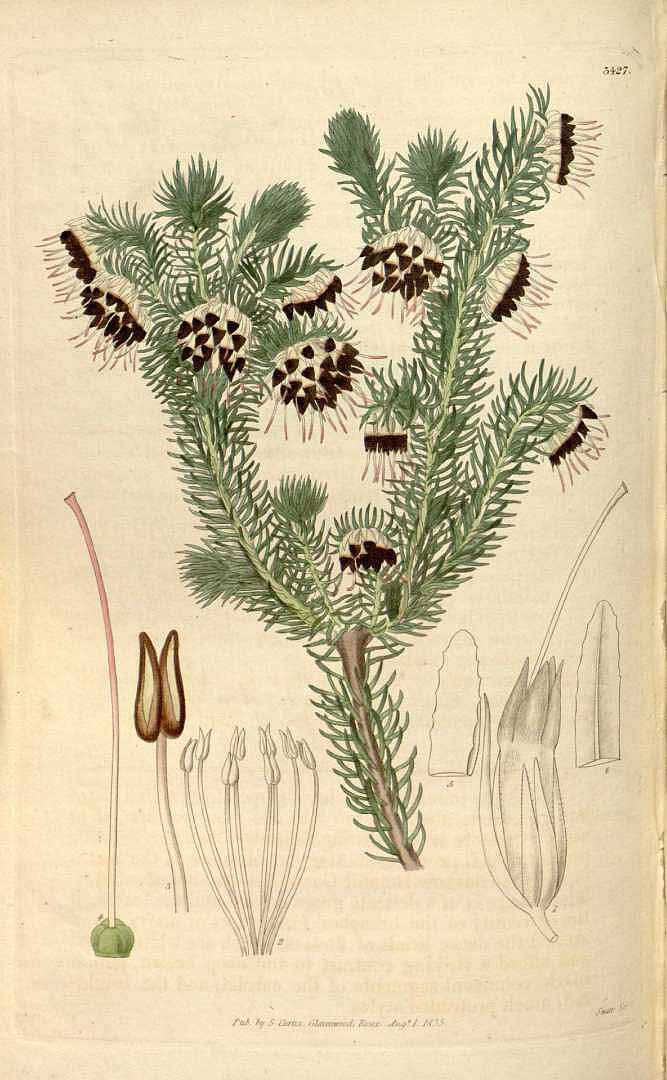
- Curtis's Botanical Magazine
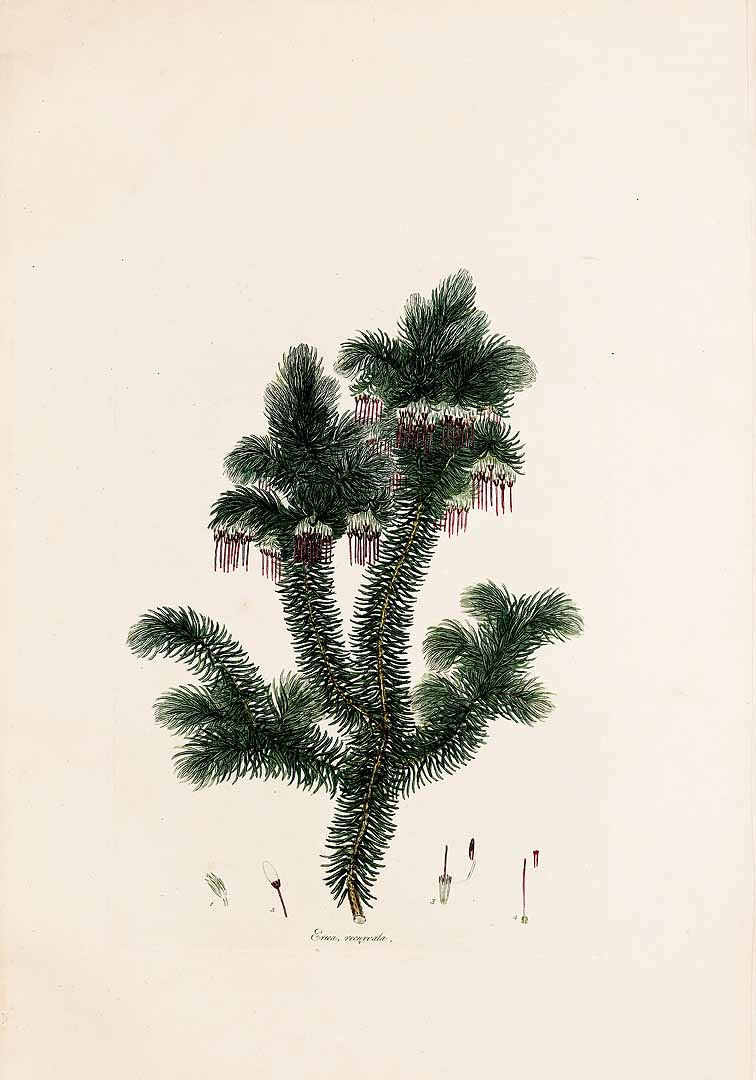
- Henry Cranke Andrews' original illustration

Scientific classification
- Kingdom: Plantae
- Clade: Tracheophytes
- Clade: Angiosperms
- Clade: Eudicots
- Clade: Asterids
- Order: Ericales
- Family: Ericaceae
- Genus: Erica
- Species: E. recurvata

Binomial name
- Erica recurvata Andrews

= Erica recurvata =

Species of flowering plant

Erica recurvata is a critically endangered South African species of Cape heath.

E. recurvata is a shrub of some 30 to 60 centimetres (12 to 24 inches) in height. It has dense whorls of small needle-like leaves which are pale green to grey-green in colour, and recurving in habit, hence the specific name. Clusters of sticky, pendulous flowers appear in winter, having white sepals, dark brown to almost black corollas, and with long, red, exserted styles.

First known from a botanical painting by Henry Cranke Andrews in the late 1700s, the species was rediscovered when it was found flowering near Napier in 2007. It belongs to the small Oxyloma section of Ericas. All three members having strongly exserted styles and including anthers.

Its distribution is limited to a small area in rocky, mountainous terrain on the Overberg where it grows in crevices between sandstone boulders.

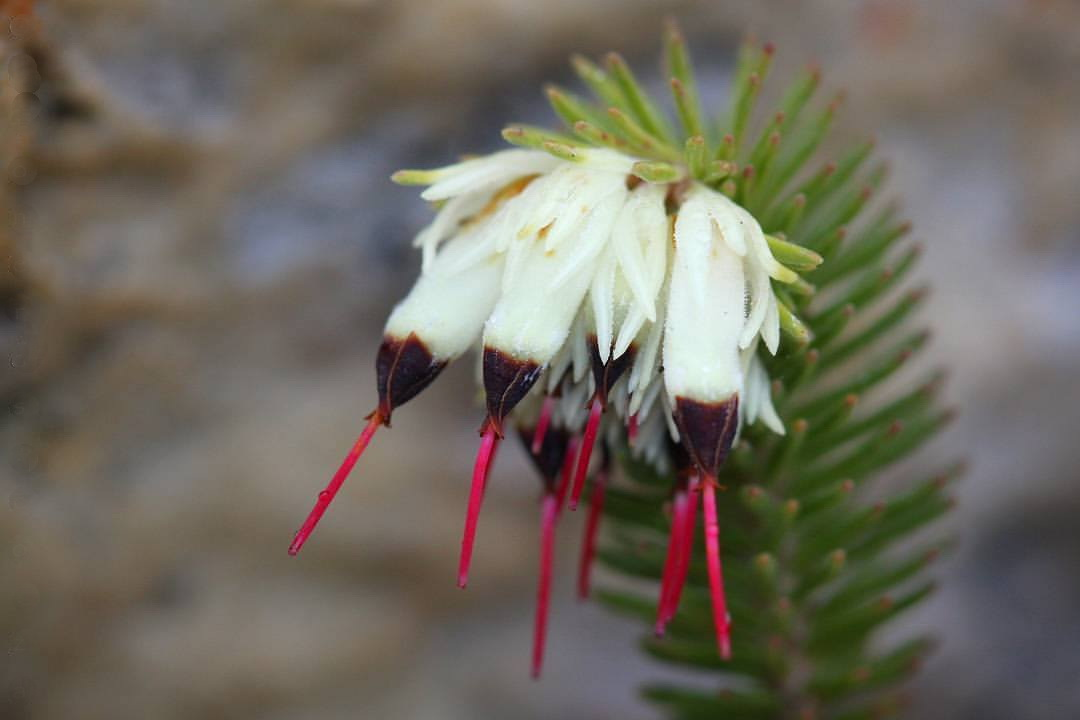
Flowers
