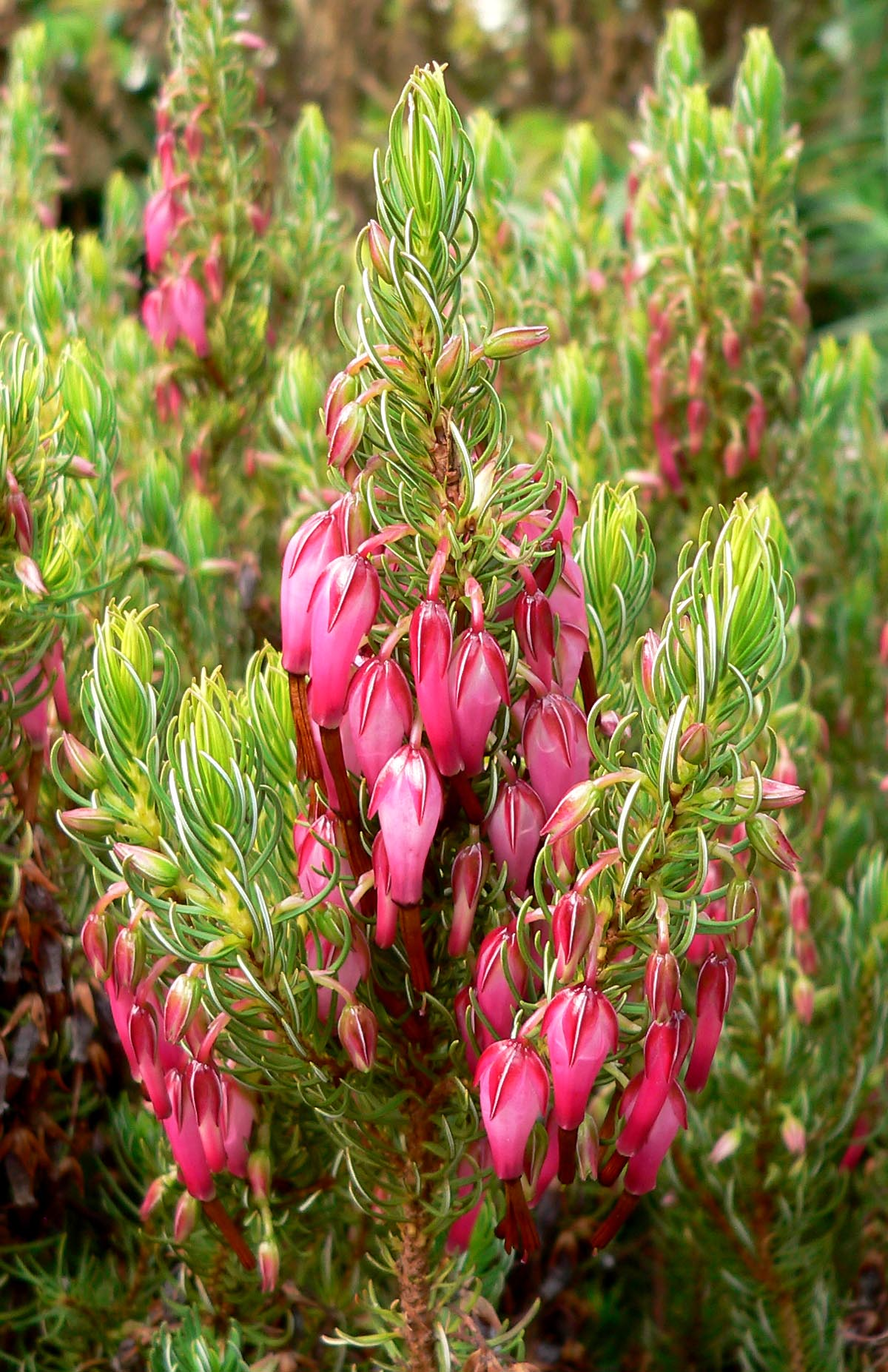

Scientific classification
- Kingdom: Plantae
- Clade: Tracheophytes
- Clade: Angiosperms
- Clade: Eudicots
- Clade: Asterids
- Order: Ericales
- Family: Ericaceae
- Genus: Erica
- Species: E. plukenetii

Binomial name
- Erica plukenetii L.

= Erica plukenetii =

Species of flowering plant

Erica plukenetii is a species of flowering plant native to the Cape region of South Africa. It belongs to the genus Erica. The species is morphologically variable, and five subspecies are recognised. The larger, variably coloured, flowers of E. plukenetii ssp. plukenetii (similar to those of E. plukenetii ssp. bredensis, E. plukenetii ssp. lineata, and E. plukenetii ssp. penicellata) are pollinated by sunbirds, whilst the smaller, exclusively white, flowers of E. plukenetii ssp. breviflora are moth pollinated.

== Gallery ==
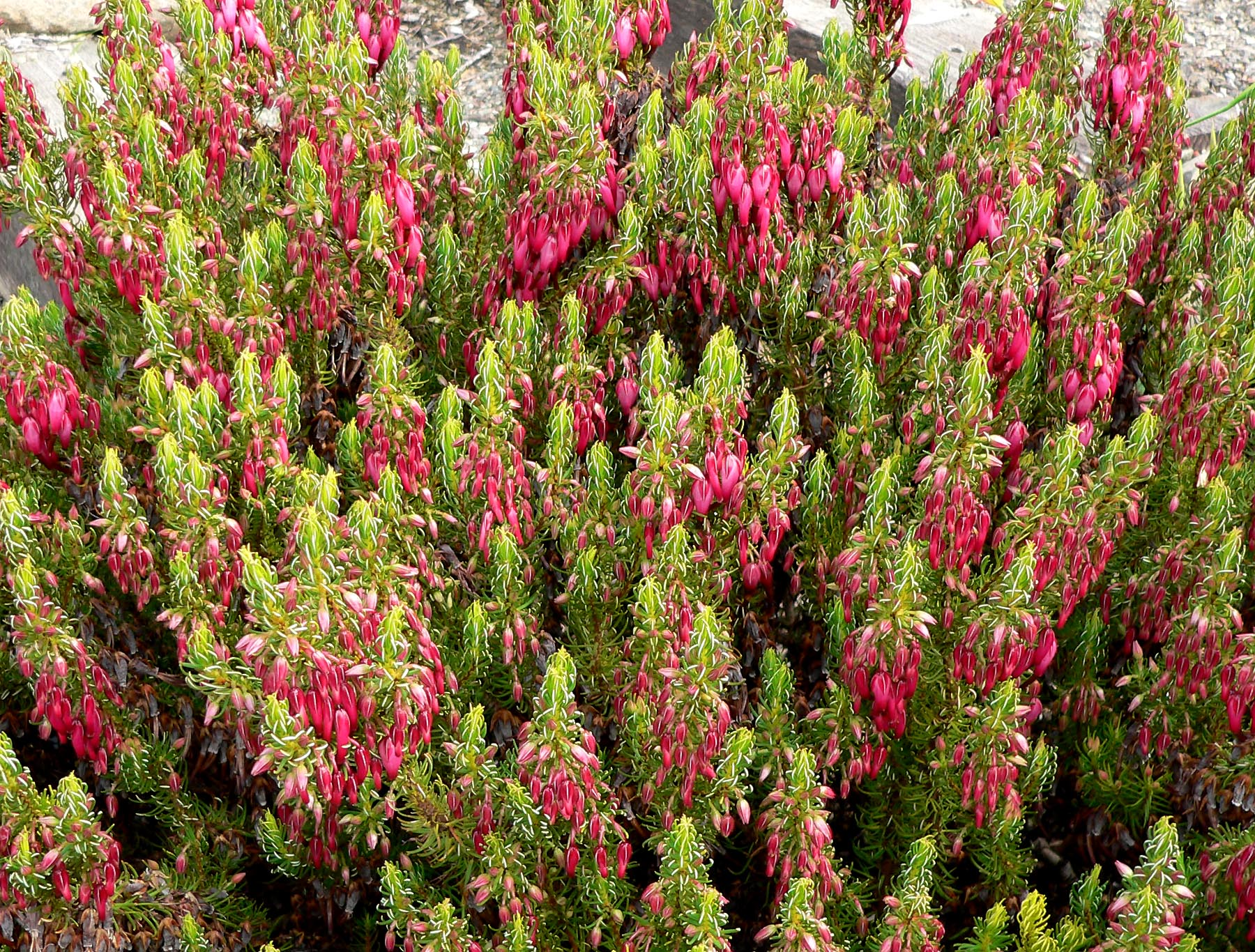
Flowering specimen of E. plukenetii ssp. plukenetii

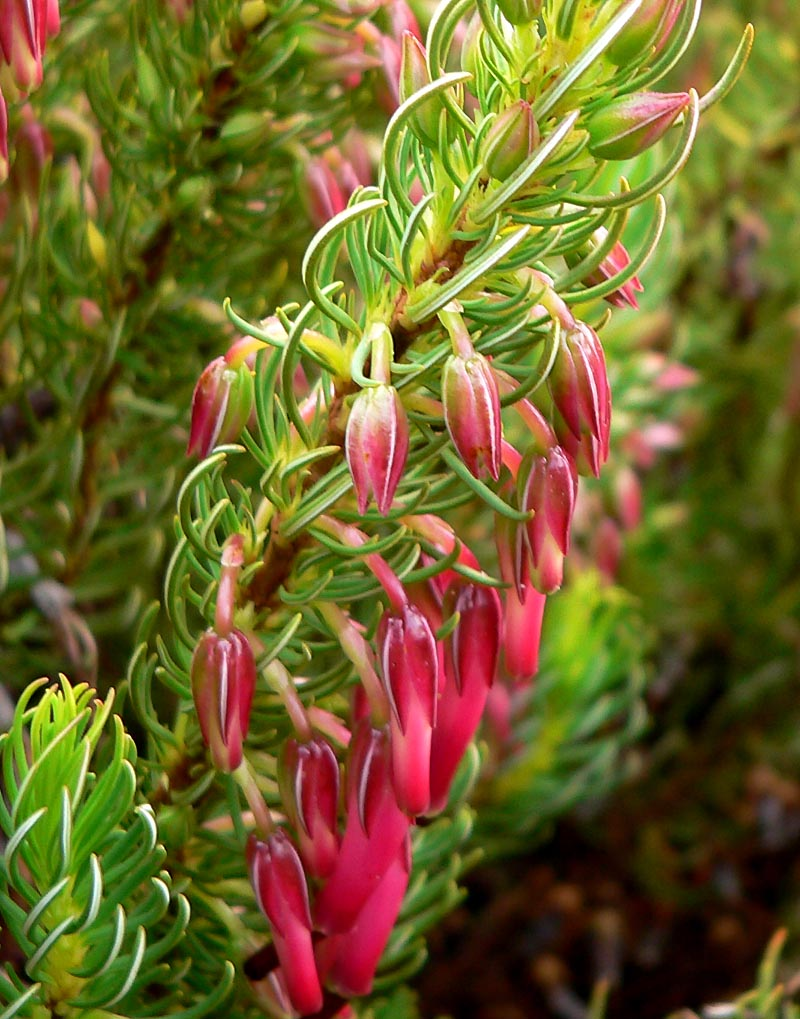
Flowering specimen of E. plukenetii ssp. plukenetii

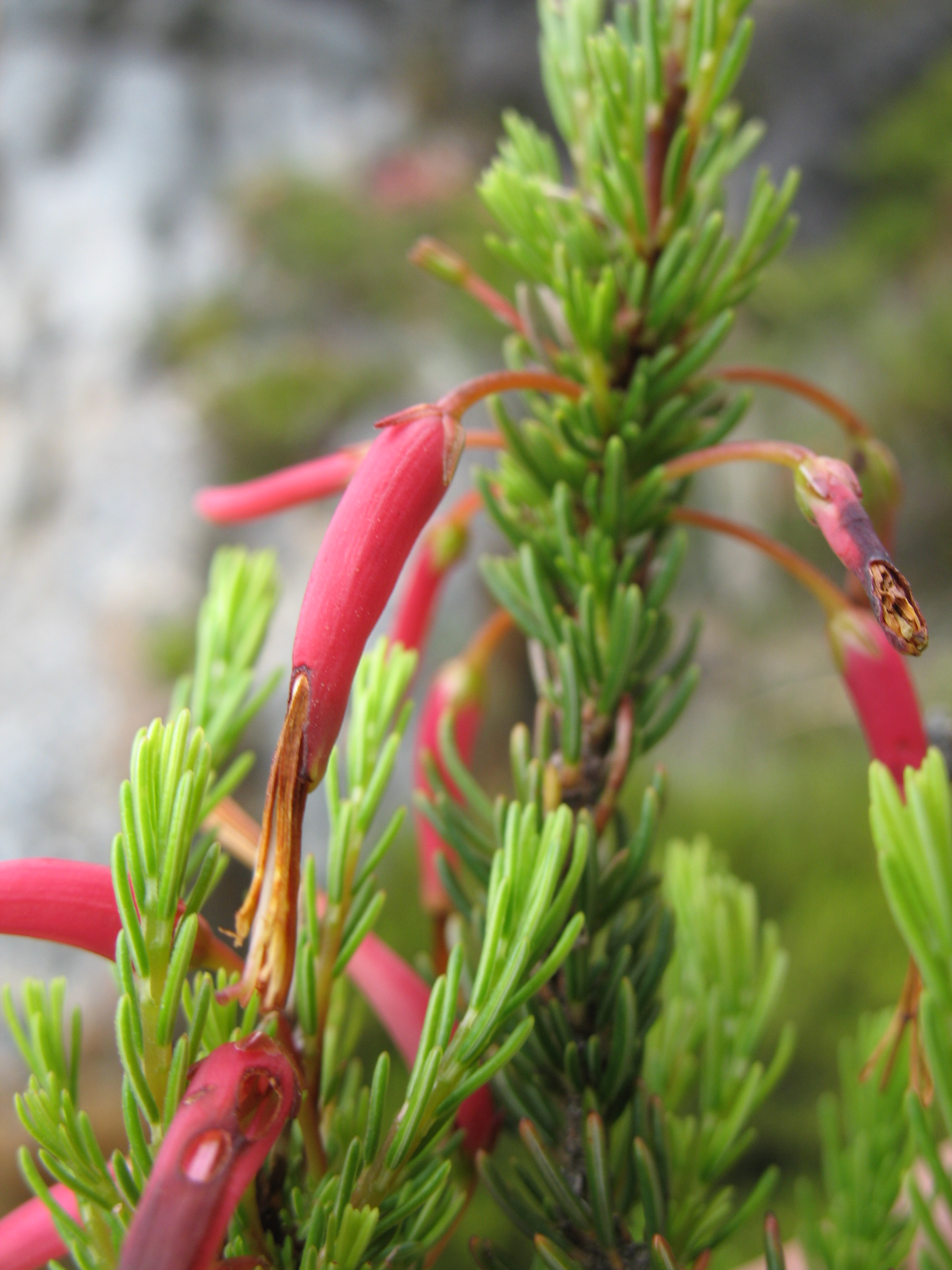
Flowering specimen of E. plukenetii ssp. plukenetii in the Western Cape, South Africa

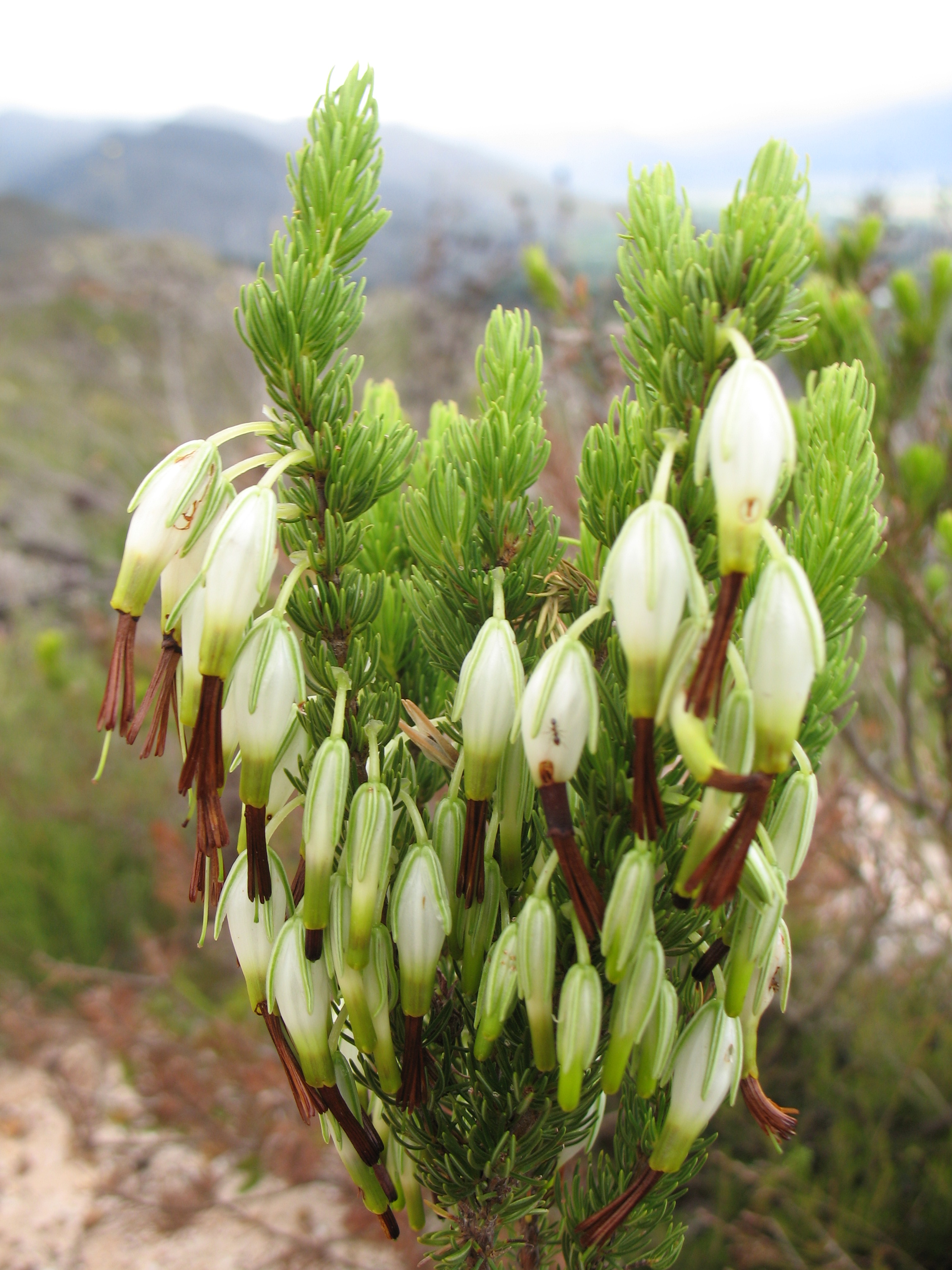
Flowering specimen of E. plukenetii ssp. plukenetii in the Western Cape, South Africa

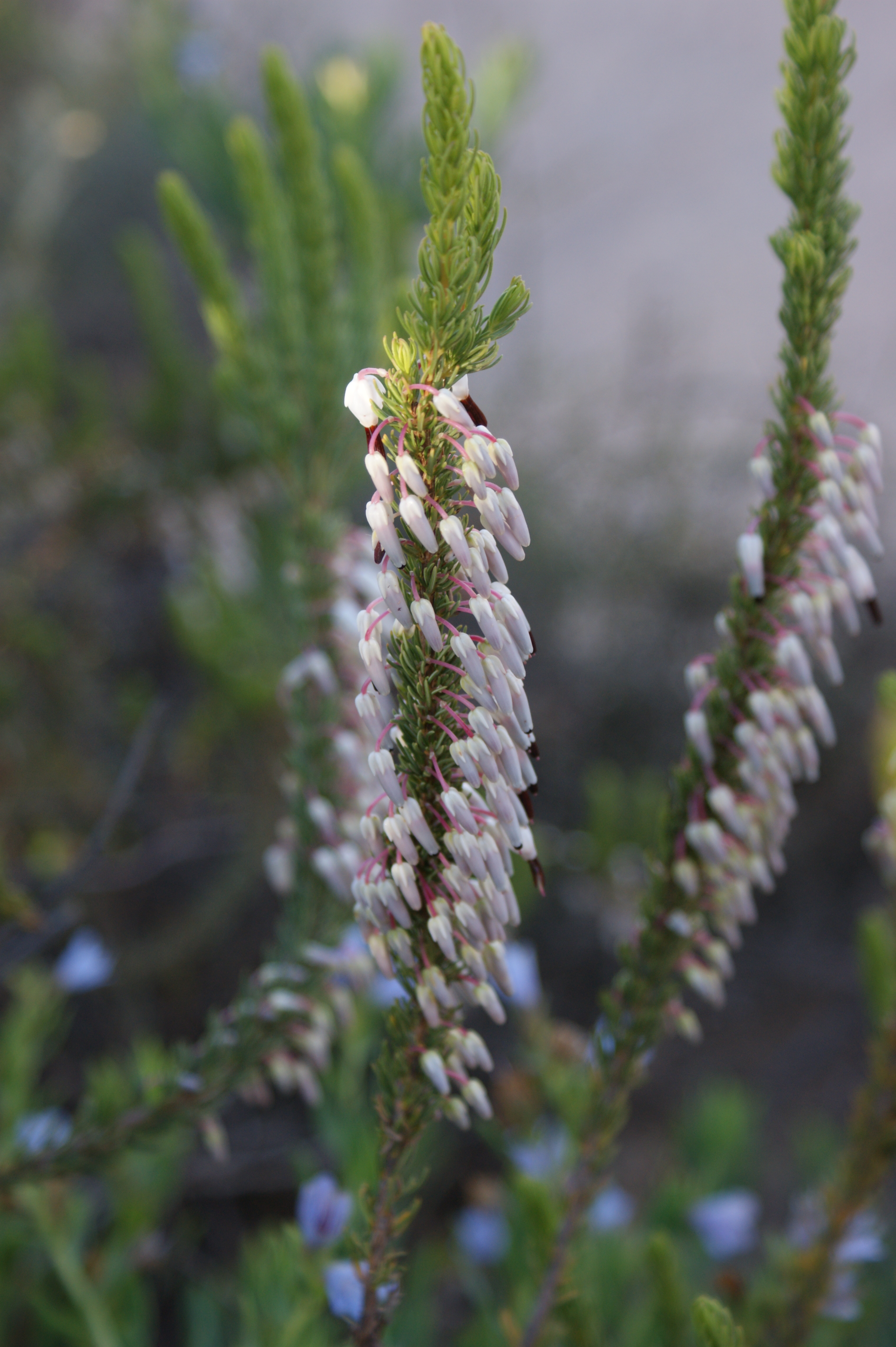
Flowering specimen of E. plukenetii ssp. breviflora in the Western Cape, South Africa

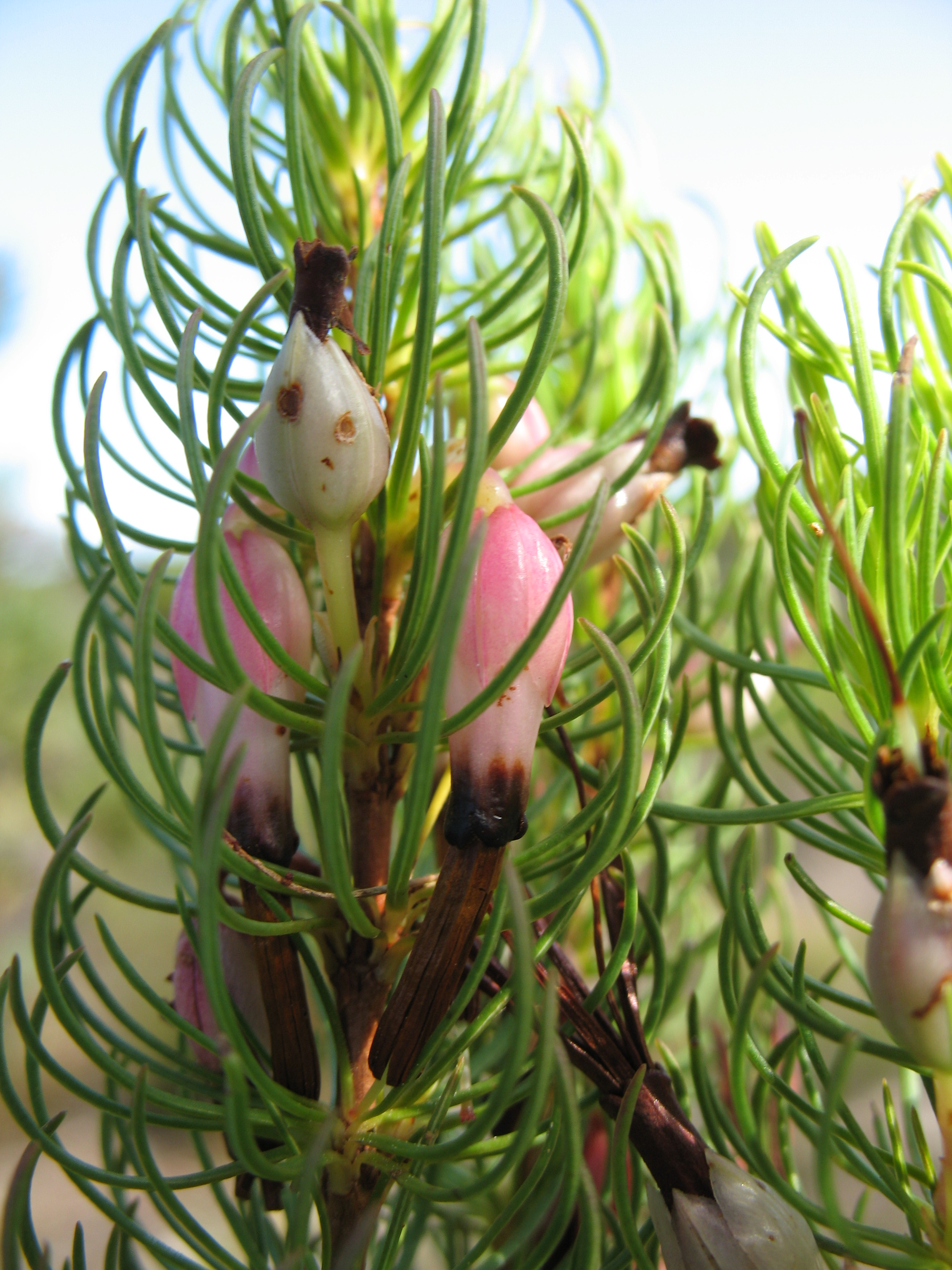
Flowering specimen of E. plukenetii ssp. lineata in the Western Cape, South Africa

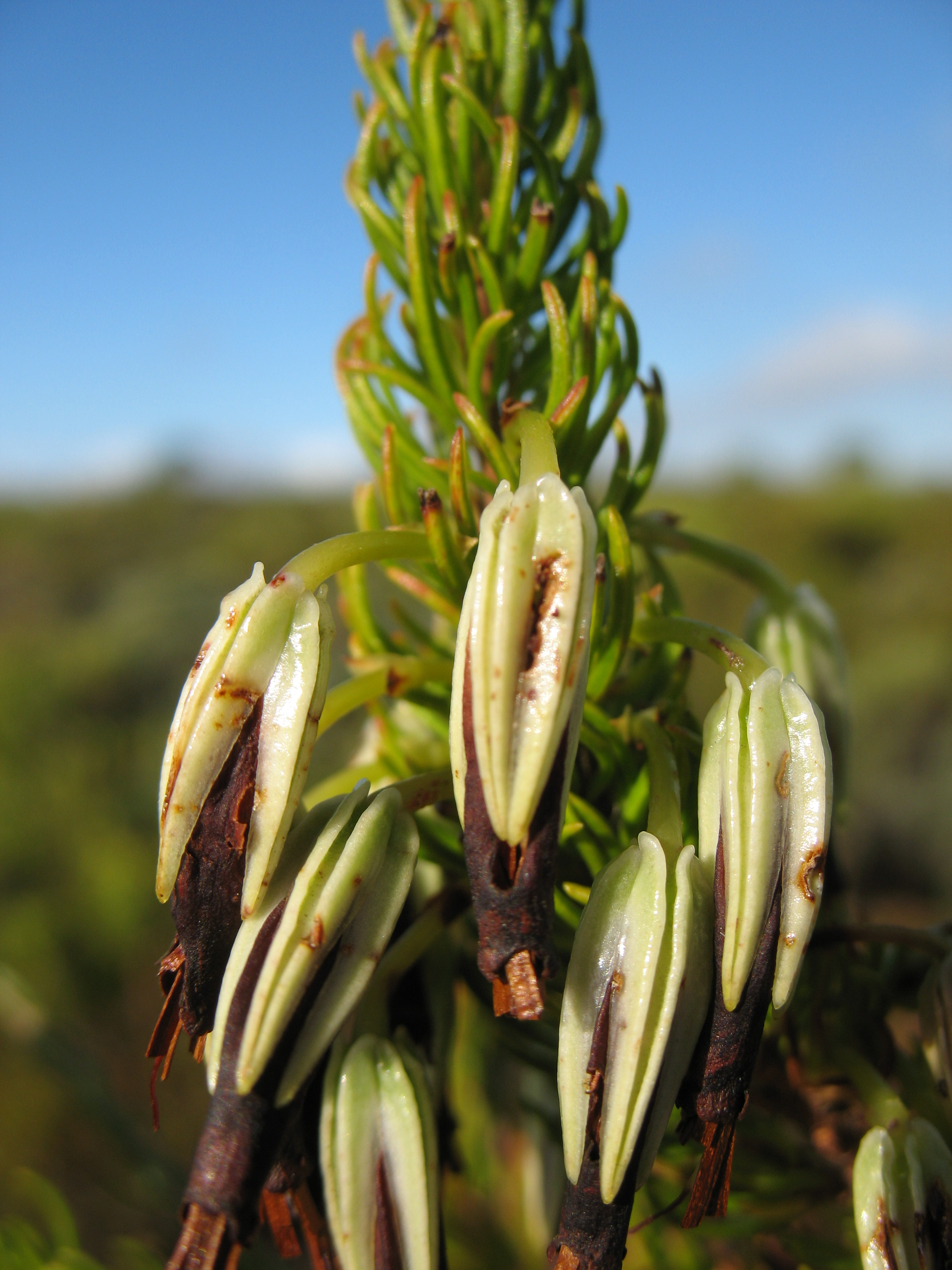
Flowering specimen of E. plukenetii ssp. penicellata in the Western Cape, South Africa
