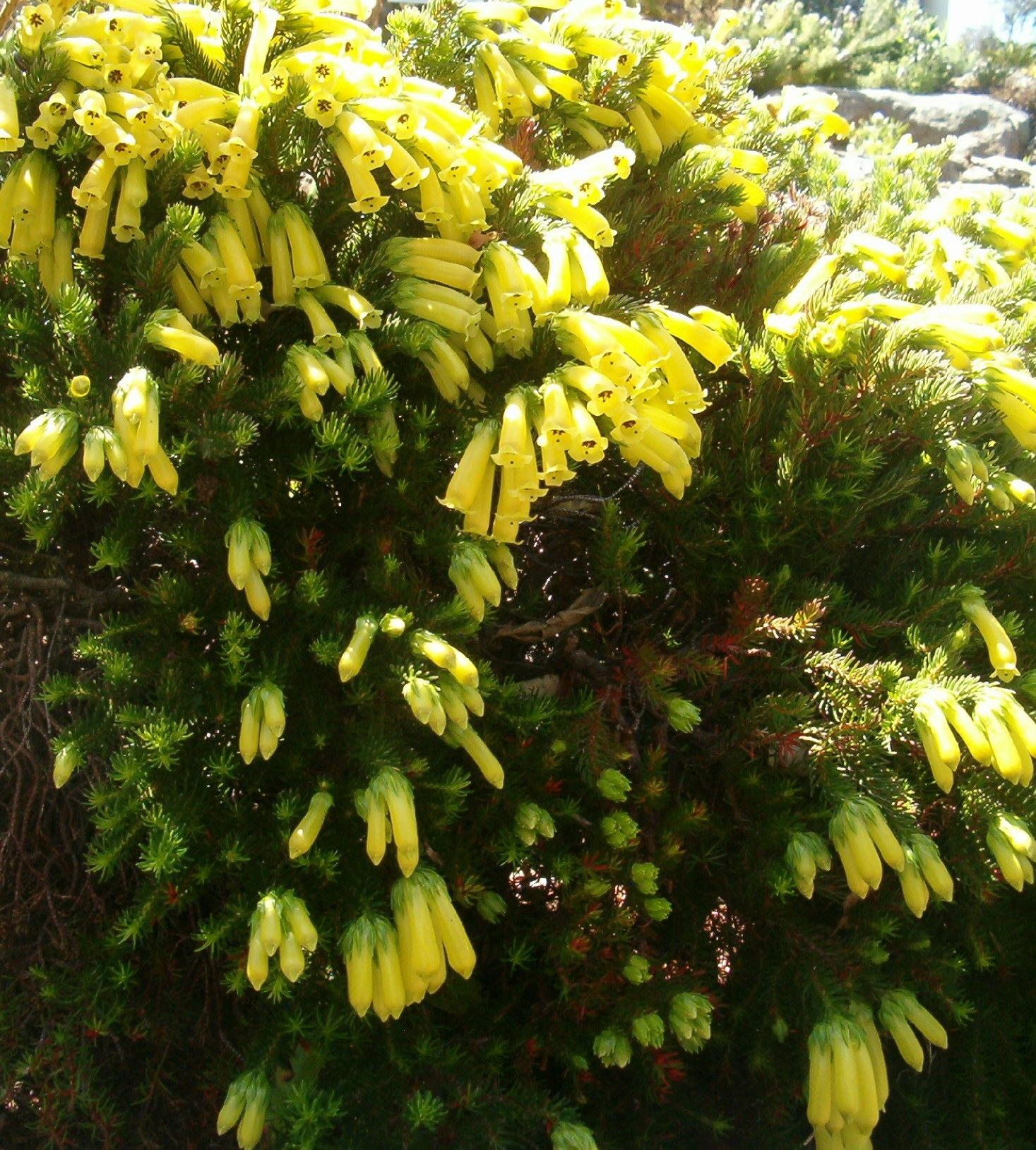

Scientific classification
- Kingdom: Plantae
- Clade: Tracheophytes
- Clade: Angiosperms
- Clade: Eudicots
- Clade: Asterids
- Order: Ericales
- Family: Ericaceae
- Genus: Erica
- Species: E. nana

Binomial name
- Erica nana Salisb.

= Erica nana =

Species of flowering plant

Erica nana is a species of Erica heath native to the fynbos region of South Africa.

== Description ==
Erica nana is a typical Cape heath, with small, fine needle-like leaves, a shrubby growth habit, and waxy yellow tubular flowers. It grows to about 1 metre (3 1/2 feet) in diameter and half that in height.
