= Diastella thymelaeoides subsp. thymelaeoides =

Conservation status
- Near Threatened (IUCN 3.1)

Scientific classification
- Kingdom: Plantae
- Clade: Tracheophytes
- Clade: Angiosperms
- Clade: Eudicots
- Order: Proteales
- Family: Proteaceae
- Genus: Diastella
- Species: D. thymelaeoides
- Subspecies: D. t. subsp. thymelaeoides

Trinomial name
- Diastella thymelaeoides subsp. thymelaeoides (P.J.Bergius) Rourke

Synonyms
- Leucadendron puberum Kuntze; Leucadendron pubigerum L. ex Meisn.; Nivenia concava R.Br.; Paranomus concavus Kuntze; Protea concava Lam.; Protea divaricata Willd. ex Meisn.; Protea thymelaeoides Poir.; Serruria candicans Roem. & Schult.

Subspecies of flowering plant

Diastella thymelaeoides subsp. thymelaeoides, the Kogelberg silkypuff, is a subspecies of Diastella thymelaeoides that belongs to the genus Diastella and forms part of the fynbos. The plant is native to the Western Cape and occurs in the Hottentots Holland Mountains and northern Kogelberg around the Steenbras Dam. The shrub grows erect and grows only 1.5 m tall and flowers throughout the year with a peak from August to November.

Fire destroys the plant but the seeds survive. Two months after flowering, the fruit falls off and ants disperse the seeds. They store the seeds in their nests. The plant is unisexual. Pollination takes place through the action of bees. The plant grows on rocky sandstone slopes at altitudes of 450-900 m.
