= Diastella divaricata subsp. montana =

Conservation status
- Least Concern (IUCN 3.1)

Scientific classification
- Kingdom: Plantae
- Clade: Tracheophytes
- Clade: Angiosperms
- Clade: Eudicots
- Order: Proteales
- Family: Proteaceae
- Genus: Diastella
- Species: D. divaricata
- Subspecies: D. d. subsp. montana

Trinomial name
- Diastella divaricata subsp. montana (P.J.Bergius) Rourke

Subspecies of flowering plant

Diastella divaricata subsp. montana, the mountain silkypuff, is a flower-bearing shrub that belongs to the genus Diastella and forms part of the fynbos. The plant is native to the Western Cape and occurs in the Wemmershoek Mountains to Villiersdorp, the western Riviersonderend Mountains, Hottentots Holland Mountains, Groenlandberg, Kleinmond and Klein River Mountains. The shrub is flat and grows only 50 cm high but 2 m in diameter and flowers throughout the year without an obvious peak.

Fire destroys the plant but the seeds survive. Two months after flowering, the fruit falls off and ants disperse the seeds. They store the seeds in their nests. The plant is unisexual. Pollination takes place through the action of bees.
