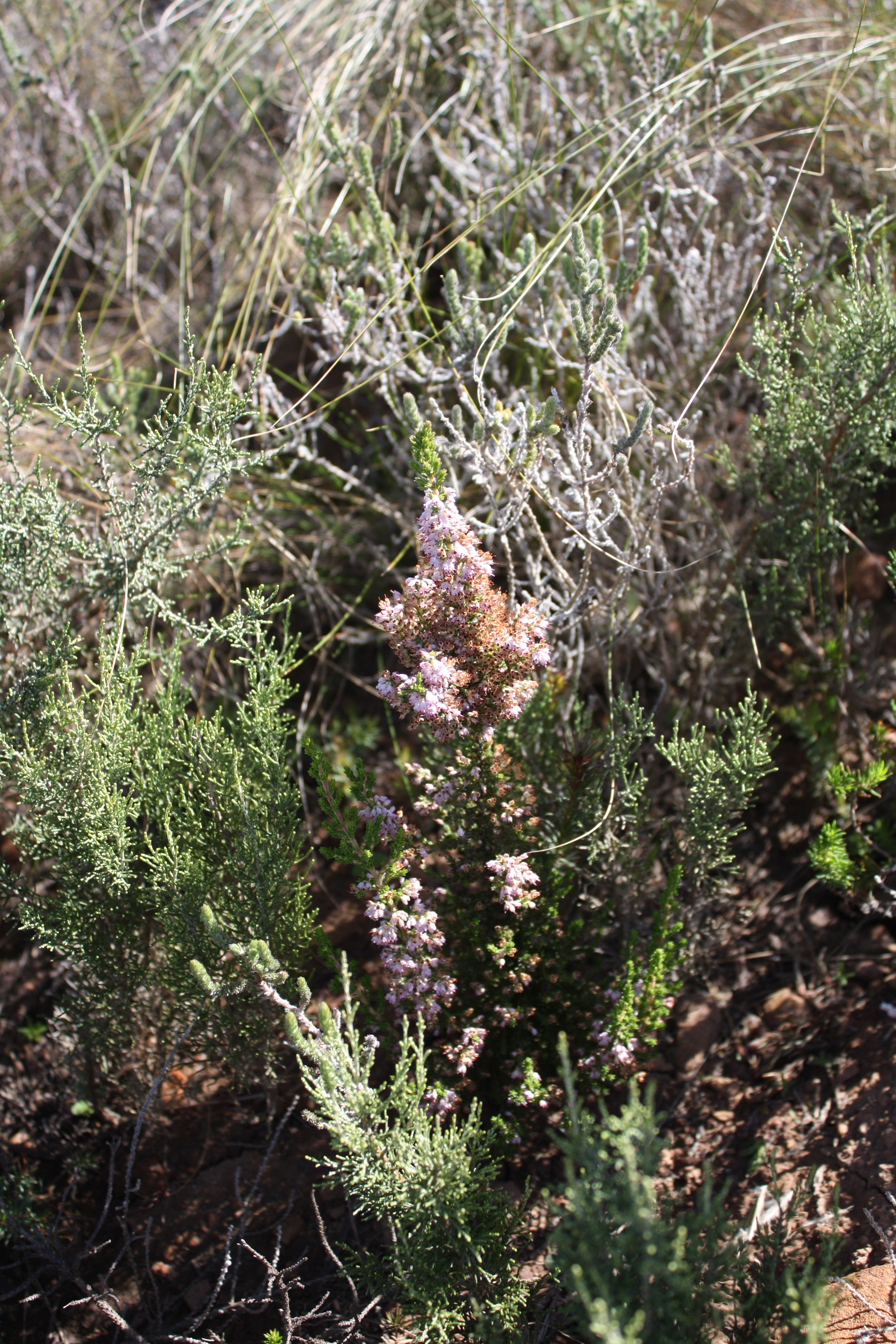

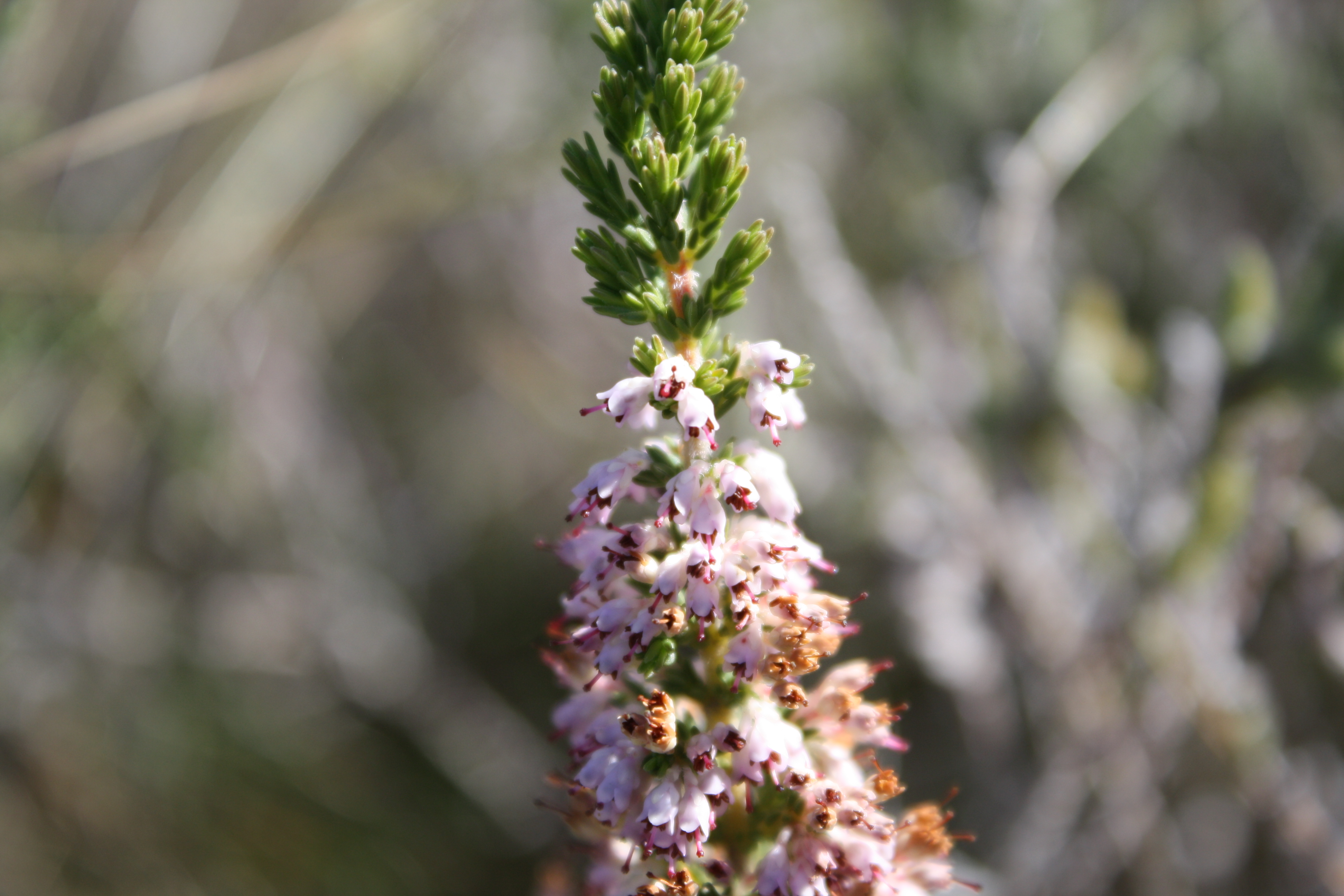

Scientific classification
- Kingdom: Plantae
- Clade: Tracheophytes
- Clade: Angiosperms
- Clade: Eudicots
- Clade: Asterids
- Order: Ericales
- Family: Ericaceae
- Genus: Erica
- Species: E. paniculata

Binomial name
- Erica paniculata L.

Synonyms
- Erica milleflora P.J.Bergius; Erica sodalis Klotzsch ex Benth.; Ericoides paniculatum (L.) Kuntze; Gypsocallis paniculata G.Don; Lamprotis paniculata G.Don

= Erica paniculata =

Feather Heath

Species of flowering plant

Erica paniculata, known in English as the feather heath, is a plant belonging to the genus Erica and is part of the fynbos. The species is endemic to the Western Cape.
