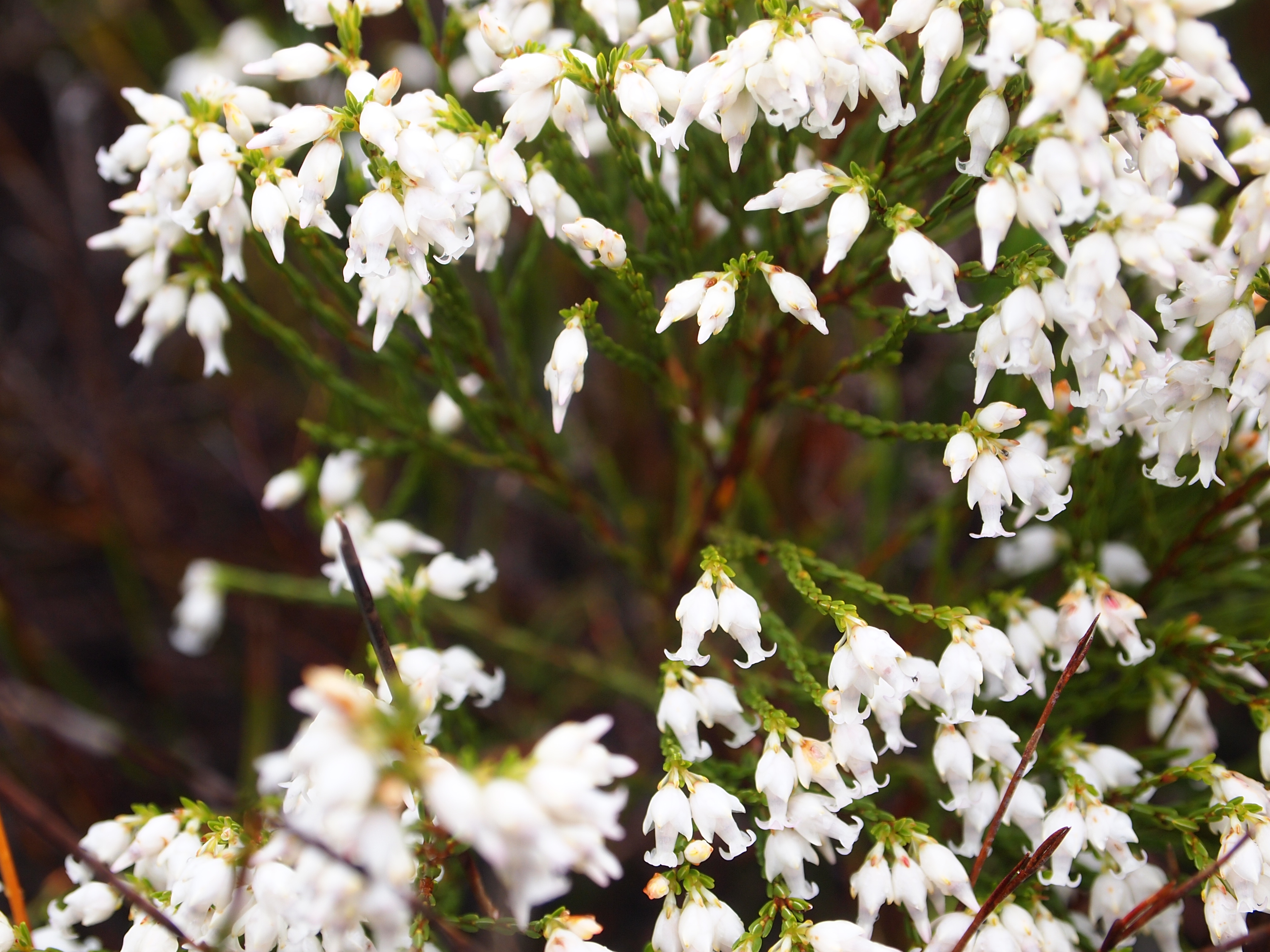

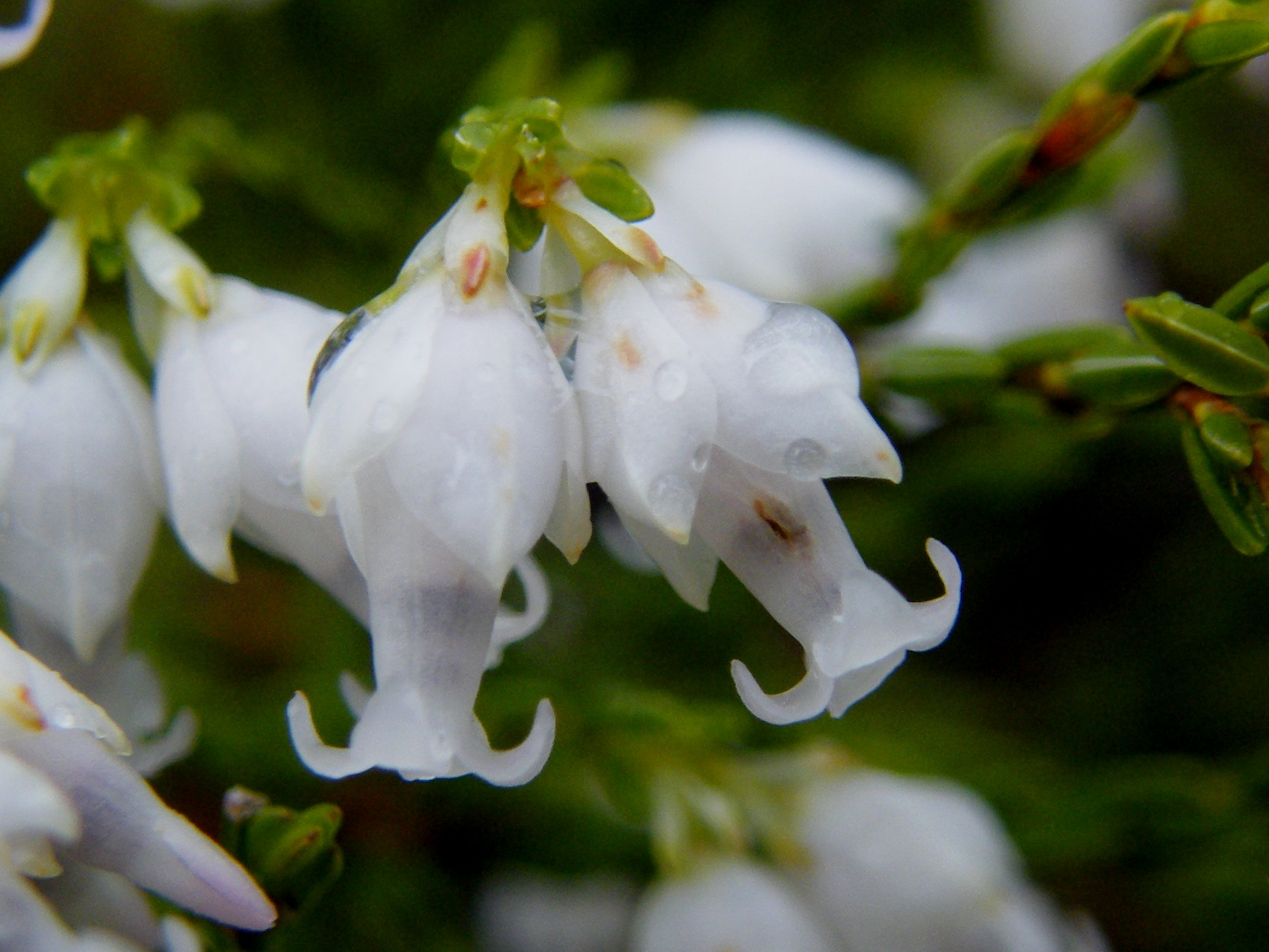

Scientific classification
- Kingdom: Plantae
- Clade: Tracheophytes
- Clade: Angiosperms
- Clade: Eudicots
- Clade: Asterids
- Order: Ericales
- Family: Ericaceae
- Genus: Erica
- Species: E. lutea

Binomial name
- Erica lutea P.J.Bergius, (1767)

Synonyms
- Erica imbellis Salisb.; Erica oppositifolia Andrews; Ericoides luteum (P.J.Bergius) Kuntze; Lamprotis lutea D.Don; Lamprotis oppositifolia G.Don

= Erica lutea =

Species of flowering plant

Erica lutea, the yellow-rice heath or rice heath, is a plant that belongs to the genus Erica and is part of the fynbos. The species is endemic to the Western Cape.
