= Diastella thymelaeoides subsp. meridiana =

Conservation status
- Near Threatened (IUCN 3.1)

Scientific classification
- Kingdom: Plantae
- Clade: Tracheophytes
- Clade: Angiosperms
- Clade: Eudicots
- Order: Proteales
- Family: Proteaceae
- Genus: Diastella
- Species: D. thymelaeoides
- Subspecies: D. t. subsp. meridiana

Trinomial name
- Diastella thymelaeoides subsp. meridiana Rourke

Subspecies of flowering plant

Diastella thymelaeoides subsp. meridiana, the Hangklip silkypuff, is a flower-bearing shrub that belongs to the genus Diastella and forms part of the fynbos. The plant is native to the Western Cape and occurs in the southern Kogelberg from Rooi-Els to Cape Hangklip as well as Betty's Bay. The shrub grows erect and grows only 1.0 m tall and flowers throughout the year with a peak from August to November.

Fire destroys the plant but the seeds survive. Two months after flowering, the fruit falls off and ants disperse the seeds. They store the seeds in their nests. The plant is unisexual. Pollination takes place through the action of bees. The plant grows on sandstone slopes at heights of 0-150 m.
