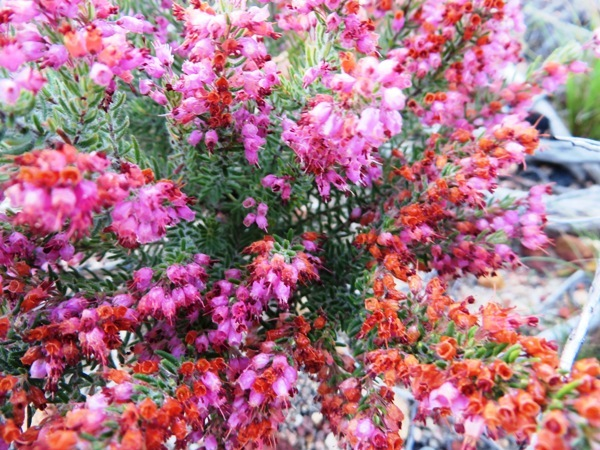

Scientific classification
- Kingdom: Plantae
- Clade: Tracheophytes
- Clade: Angiosperms
- Clade: Eudicots
- Clade: Asterids
- Order: Ericales
- Family: Ericaceae
- Genus: Erica
- Species: E. nudiflora

Binomial name
- Erica nudiflora L., (1771)

Synonyms
- Blaeria nudiflora (L.) Thunb.; Erica alopecuroides G.Lodd.; Erica floribunda J.C.Wendl.; Erica microstoma P.J.Bergius; Erica sertiflora Salisb.; Gypsocallis microstoma G.Don; Gypsocallis nudiflora D.Don

= Erica nudiflora =

Species of flowering plant

Erica nudiflora is a plant that belongs to the genus Erica and is part of the fynbos. The species is endemic to the Western Cape.
