= Erica diaphana =

Scientific classification
- Kingdom: Plantae
- Clade: Tracheophytes
- Clade: Angiosperms
- Clade: Eudicots
- Clade: Asterids
- Order: Ericales
- Family: Ericaceae
- Genus: Erica
- Species: E. diaphana

Binomial name
- Erica diaphana Spreng.

Synonyms
- Callista comosa (L.) D.Donv; Erica comosa L.; Erica galiiflora Salisb.; Erica transparens P.J.Bergius; Erica transparens Andrews; Ericoides comosum (L.) Kuntze; Ericoides transparens (Andrews) Kuntze; Syringodea diaphana G.Don

Species of flowering plant

Erica diaphana, the diaphanous heath, is a plant belonging to the genus Erica and forming part of the fynbos. The species is endemic to the Eastern and Western Cape.
