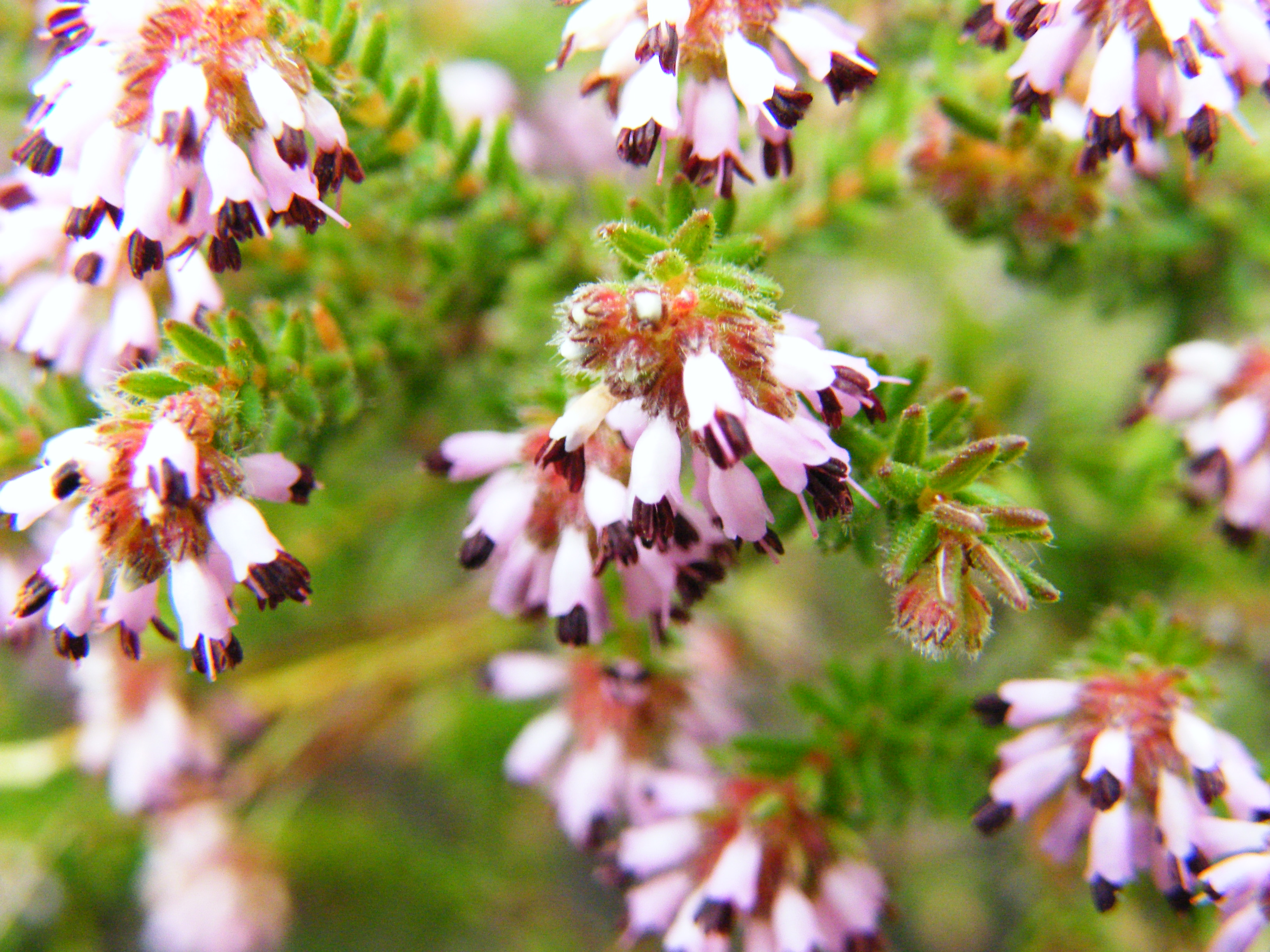

Scientific classification
- Kingdom: Plantae
- Clade: Tracheophytes
- Clade: Angiosperms
- Clade: Eudicots
- Clade: Asterids
- Order: Ericales
- Family: Ericaceae
- Genus: Erica
- Species: E. glabella

Binomial name
- Erica glabella Thunb., (1794)

Synonyms
- Blaeria depressa Licht. ex Roem. & Schult.; Blaeria fasciculata Willd.; Blaeria glabella (Thunb.) Willd.; Blaeria purpurea P.J.Bergius; Blaeria pusilla L.; Blaeria scabra Willd.; Erica acutifolia Bartl.; Erica dumosa Salisb.; Erica embolifera Salisb.; Erica exilis Salisb.; Erica expromta Spreng.; Erica fasciculata Thunb.; Erica formosa Andrews; Erica purpurea (P.J.Bergius) Thunb.; Erica pusilla (L.) Thunb.; Erica rigidiuscula J.C.Wendl. ex Klotzsch; Erica salisburia Andrews; Erica scabra Thunb.; Erica superba Sweet; Ericoides purpureum (P.J.Bergius) Kuntze; Gypsocallis exprompta G.Don; Octogonia glabella (Thunb.) Klotzsch; Simocheilus depressus (Licht. ex Roem. & Schult.) Benth.; Simocheilus glabellus (Thunb.) Benth.; Simocheilus patens Benth.; Simocheilus patulus N.E.Br.; Simocheilus purpureus (P.J.Bergius) Druce; Syndesmanthus fasciculatus (Willd.) Klotzsch; Syringodea purpurea (P.J.Bergius) G.Don; Syringodea salisburia (Andrews) G.Don; Thoracosperma depressa (Licht. ex Roem. & Schult.) Kuntze; Thoracosperma fasciculata Kuntze; Thoracosperma glabella (Thunb.) Kuntze; Thoracosperma patens (Benth.) Kuntze

= Erica glabella =

Species of flowering plant

Erica glabella is a plant belonging to the genus Erica and forming part of the fynbos. The species is endemic to the Western Cape.
