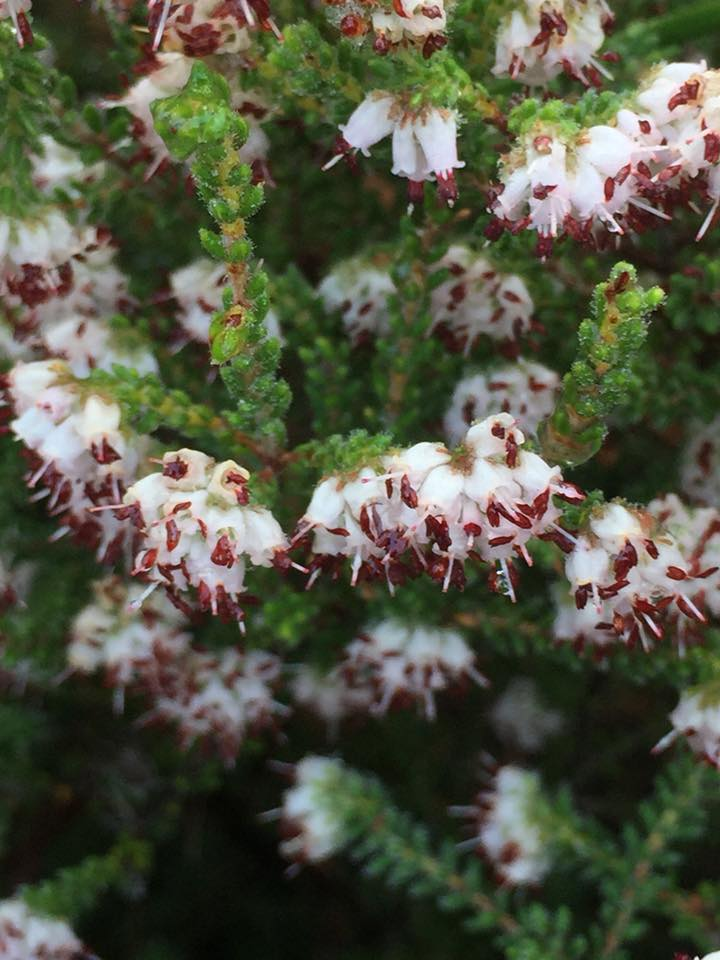

Scientific classification
- Kingdom: Plantae
- Clade: Tracheophytes
- Clade: Angiosperms
- Clade: Eudicots
- Clade: Asterids
- Order: Ericales
- Family: Ericaceae
- Genus: Erica
- Species: E. imbricata

Binomial name
- Erica imbricata L., (1762)

Synonyms
- List: Ectasis imbricata (L.) D.Don; Erica brunneoalba Bartl.; Erica caesia Salisb.; Erica densiflora Bartl.; Erica divaricata J.C.Wendl.; Erica flexuosa Andrews; Erica glaucifolia Klotzsch ex Benth.; Erica laricifolia Lam.; Erica leptocephala Klotzsch ex Benth.; Erica myriantha Bartl.; Erica ornata Klotzsch ex Benth.; Erica paleacea Klotzsch ex Benth.; Erica porrigens Bartl.; Erica pyramidalis Salisb.; Erica quinquangularis P.J.Bergius; Erica ramulosa Bartl.; Erica sparsa Klotzsch ex Benth.; Erica squamiflora Salisb.; Erica stylosa Salisb.; Erica trifaria Klotzsch ex Benth.; Erica violacea Klotzsch ex Benth.; Ericoides imbricatum (L.) Kuntze; Gypsocallis caesia G.Don; Gypsocallis flexuosa G.Don; Gypsocallis imbricata G.Don; Gypsocallis squamiflora G.Don; Gypsocallis stylosa G.Don

= Erica imbricata =

Species of flowering plant

Erica imbricata is a plant that belongs to the genus Erica and is part of the fynbos. This species is endemic to the Western Cape.
