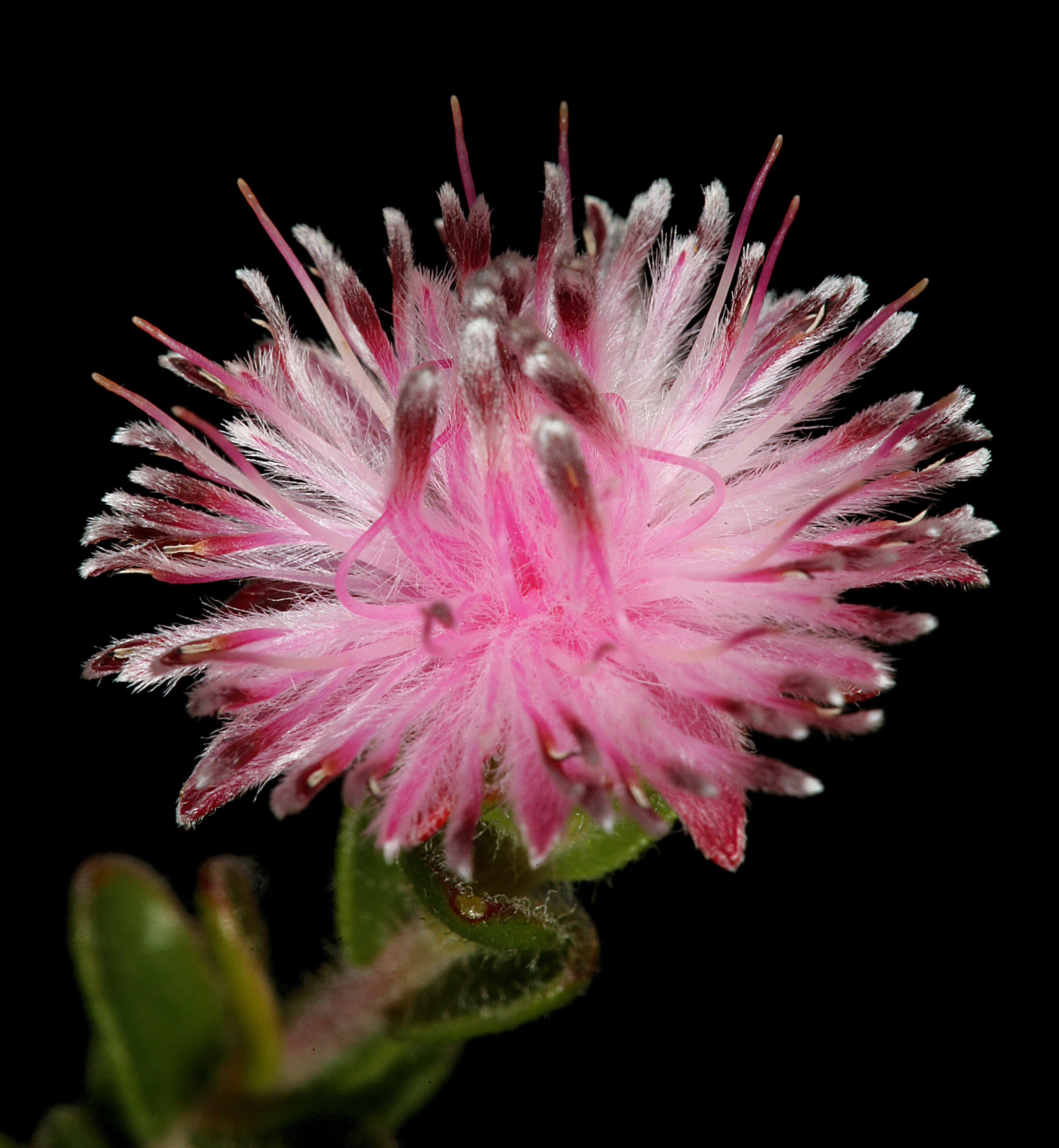

Conservation status
- Critically Endangered (IUCN 3.1)

Scientific classification
- Kingdom: Plantae
- Clade: Tracheophytes
- Clade: Angiosperms
- Clade: Eudicots
- Order: Proteales
- Family: Proteaceae
- Genus: Diastella
- Species: D. divaricata
- Subspecies: D. d. subsp. divaricata

Trinomial name
- Diastella divaricata subsp. divaricata

Synonyms
- Diastella vacciniifolia Knight; Mimetes parviflorus Klotzsch ex Krauss; Mimetes vacciniifolius (Knight) Sweet

= Diastella divaricata subsp. divaricata =

Subspecies of flowering plant

Diastella divaricata subsp. divaricata, the peninsula silkypuff, is a subspecies of Diastella that belongs to the genus Diastella and forms part of the fynbos. The plant is native to the Western Cape and is found on the Cape Peninsula south of the Silvermine Nature Reserve. The shrub is flat and grows only 50 cm high but 3 m in diameter and flowers throughout the year without an obvious peak.

Fire destroys the plant but the seeds survive. Two months after flowering, the fruit falls off and ants disperse the seeds. They store the seeds in their nests. The plant is unisexual. Pollination takes place through the action of bees. The plant grows in moist sand at altitudes of 0-600 m.
