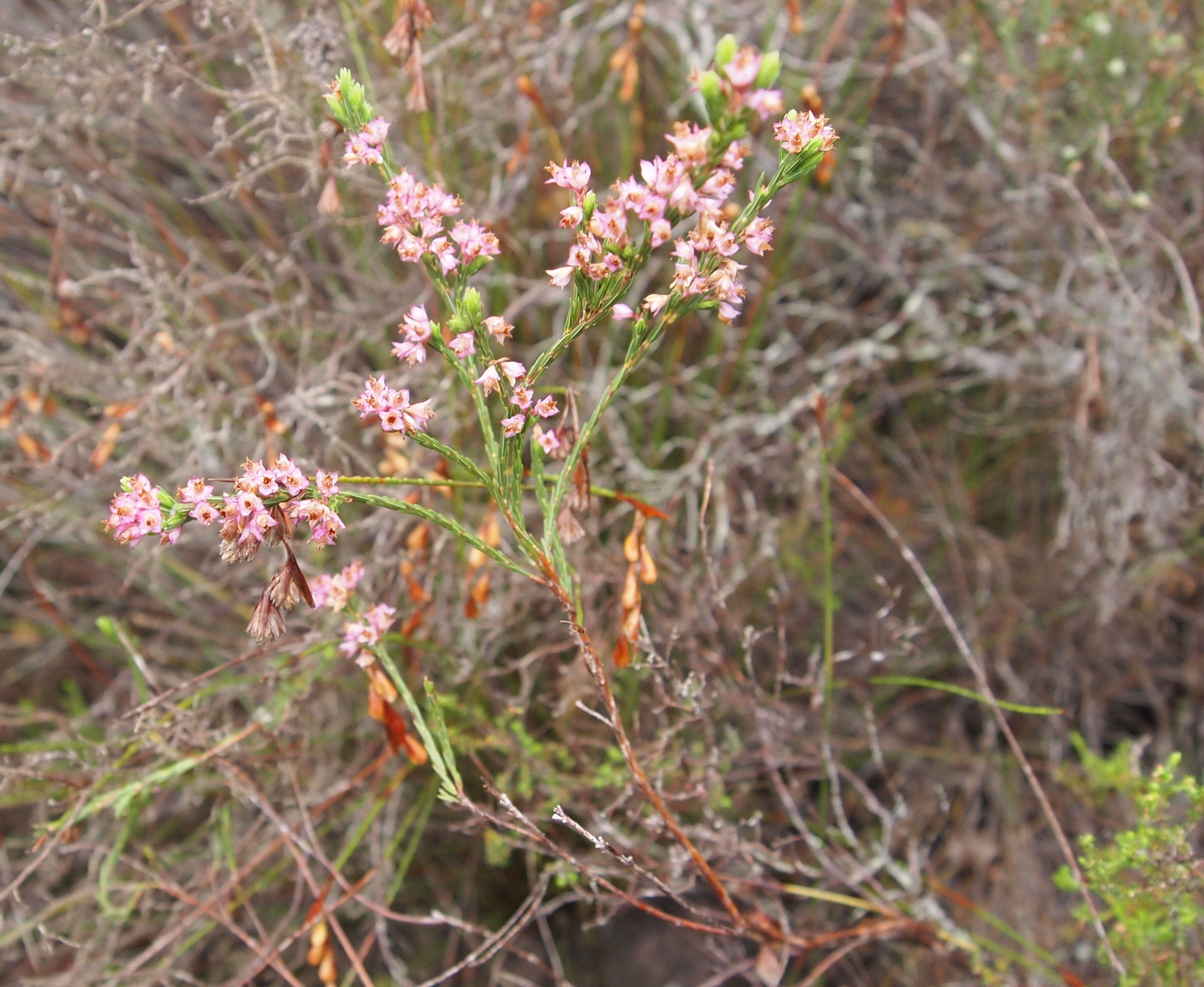

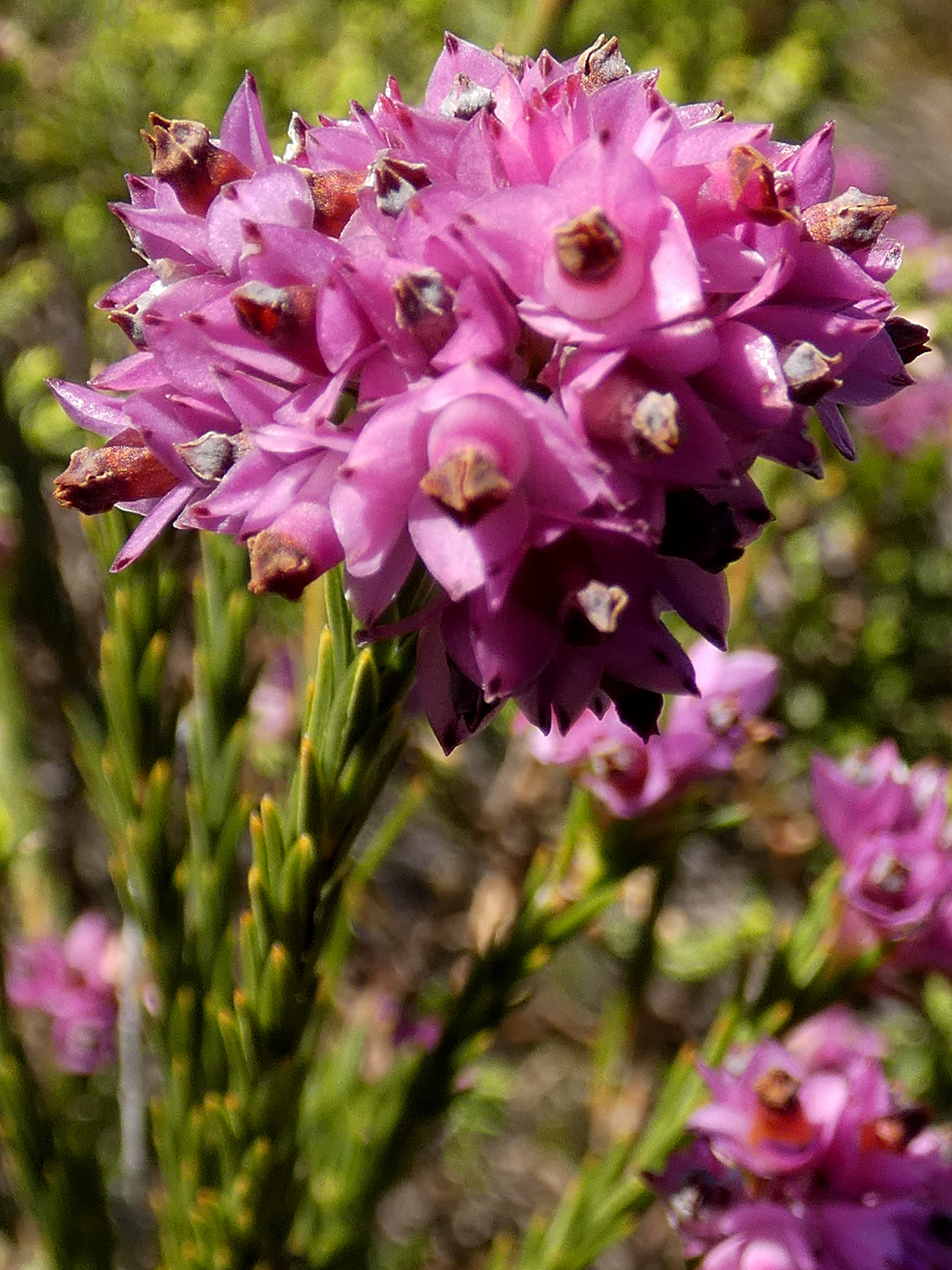

Scientific classification
- Kingdom: Plantae
- Clade: Tracheophytes
- Clade: Angiosperms
- Clade: Eudicots
- Clade: Asterids
- Order: Ericales
- Family: Ericaceae
- Genus: Erica
- Species: E. corifolia

Binomial name
- Erica corifolia L., (1753)

Synonyms
- Erica alopecias Tausch; Erica calycanthoides Klotzsch; Erica calycina Andrews; Erica corifolia P.J.Bergius; Erica obtecta Tausch; Erica patula Klotzsch; Erica tunicata Bartl.; Ericoides corifolium (L.) Kuntze; Ericoides patulum (Klotzsch) Kuntze; Lamprotis corifolia G.Don

= Erica corifolia =

Species of flowering plant

Erica corifolia, the darktip heath, is a species of flowering plant in the genus Erica, and is part of the Fynbos. It is endemic to the province of Western Cape in South Africa. Some have been found in Free State as well.
