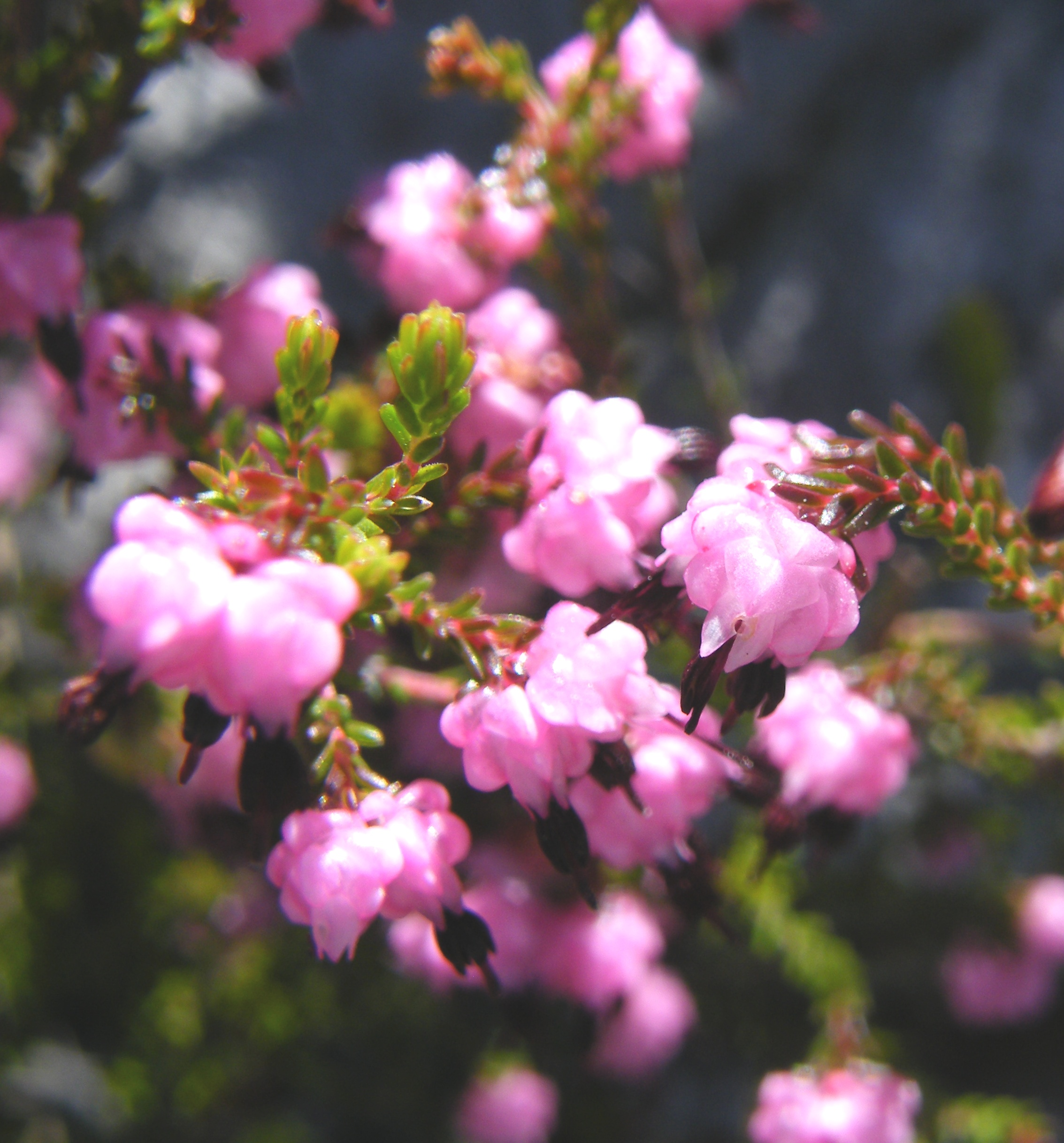

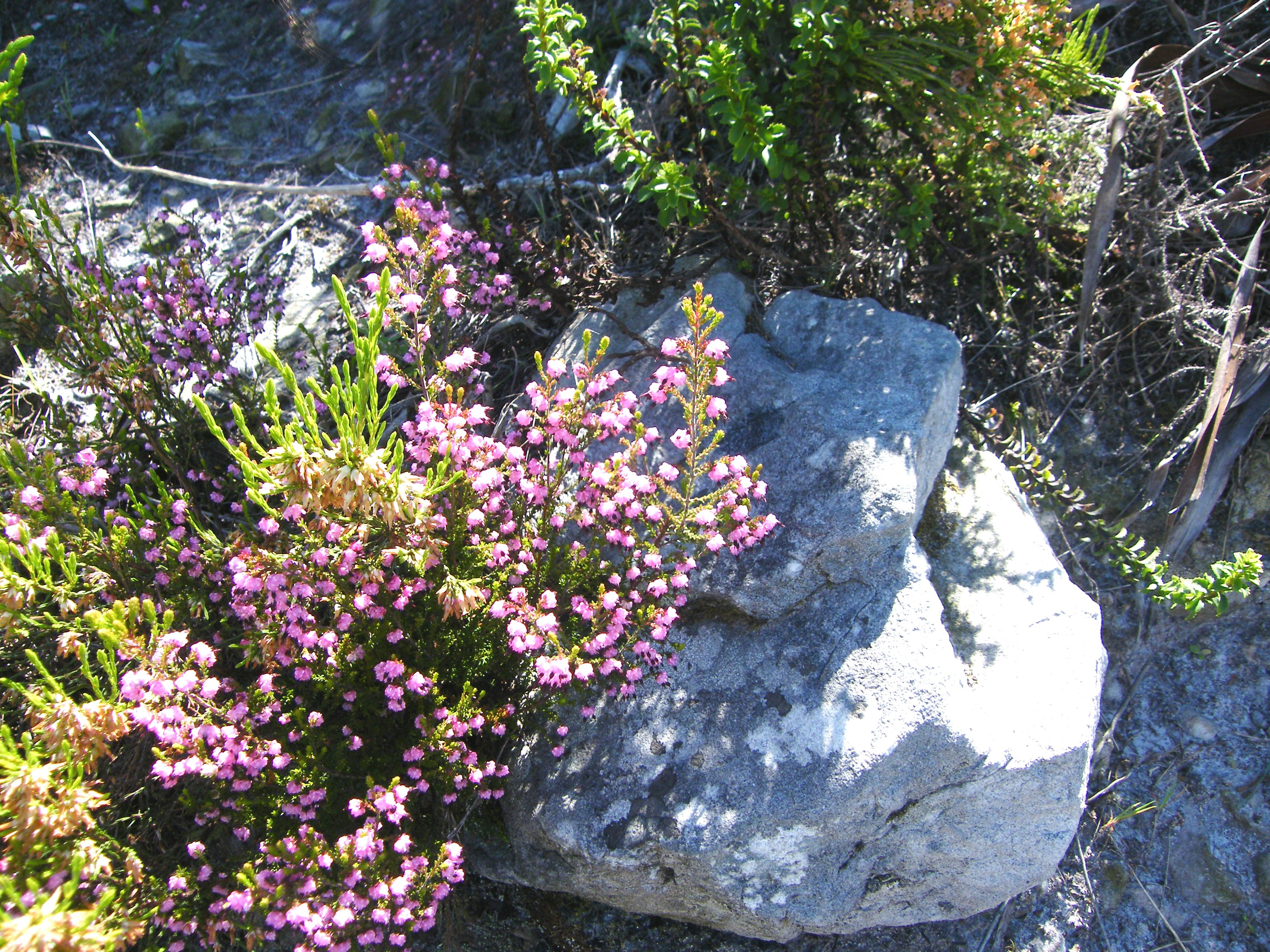

Scientific classification
- Kingdom: Plantae
- Clade: Tracheophytes
- Clade: Angiosperms
- Clade: Eudicots
- Clade: Asterids
- Order: Ericales
- Family: Ericaceae
- Genus: Erica
- Species: E. spumosa

Binomial name
- Erica spumosa L.

Synonyms
- Erica scariosa P.J.Bergius; Erica turbinata Andrews; Ericoides spumosum (L.) Kuntze; Lamprotis loddigesii G.Don; Lamprotis spumosa G.Don

= Erica spumosa =

Frothy Heath

Species of flowering plant

Erica spumosa, known as the frothy heath, is a plant belonging to the genus Erica. The species is endemic to the Western Cape.
