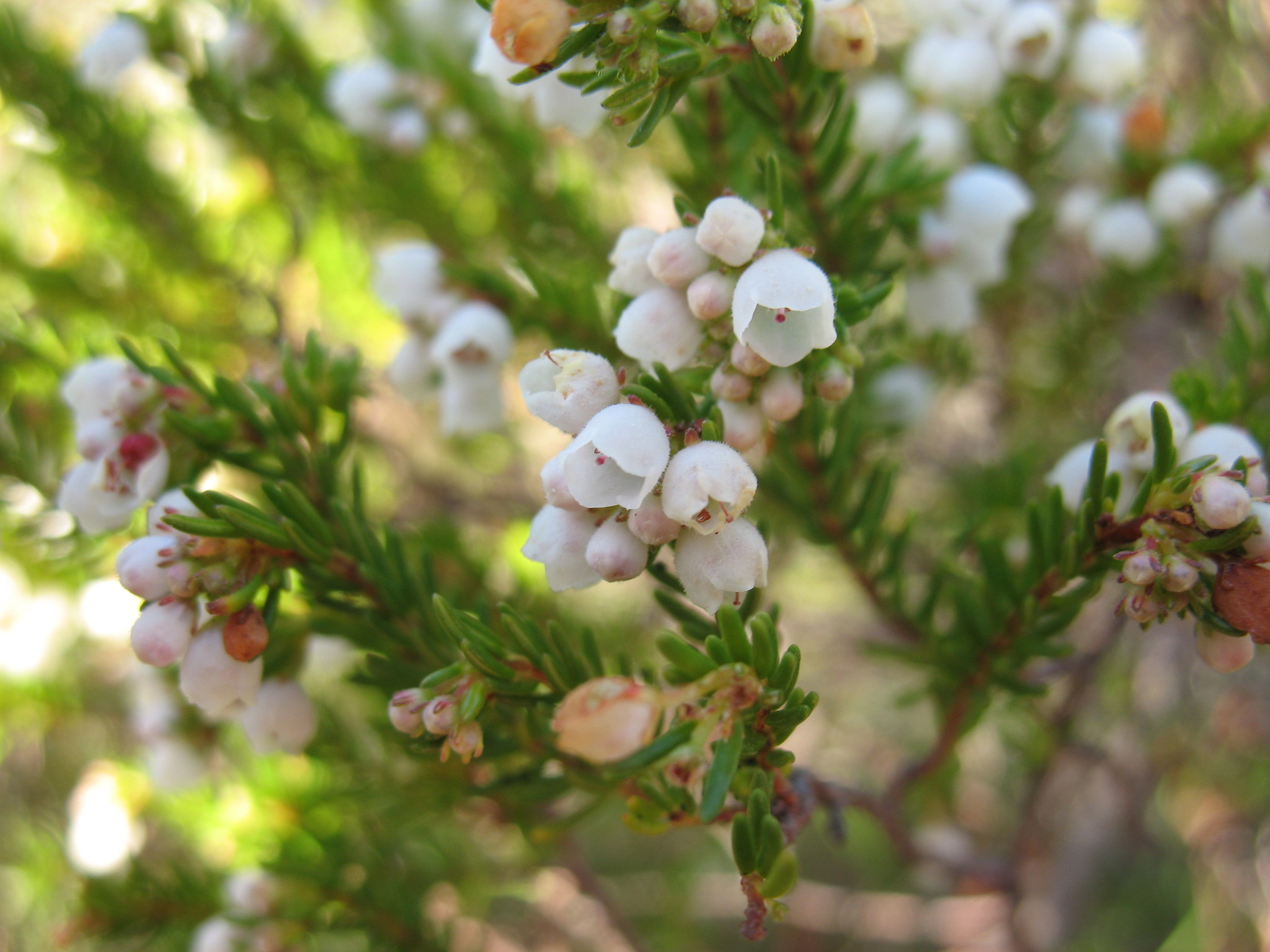

Scientific classification
- Kingdom: Plantae
- Clade: Tracheophytes
- Clade: Angiosperms
- Clade: Eudicots
- Clade: Asterids
- Order: Ericales
- Family: Ericaceae
- Genus: Erica
- Species: E. subdivaricata

Binomial name
- Erica subdivaricata P.J.Bergius

Synonyms
- Erica assurgens Link; Erica caffra Andrews; Erica congesta J.C.Wendl.; Erica eburnea Benth.; Erica exserens Klotzsch ex Benth.; Erica pallidiflora Klotzsch ex Benth.; Erica persoluta L.; Erica prolifera Salisb.; Erica regerminans Benth.; Erica setacea Drège ex Benth.; Erica strigosa J.C.Wendl.; Ericoides persolutum (L.) Kuntze

= Erica subdivaricata =

Cup Heath

Species of flowering plant

Erica subdivaricata, known by the common name cup heath, is a plant belonging to the genus Erica. The species is endemic to the Western Cape.
