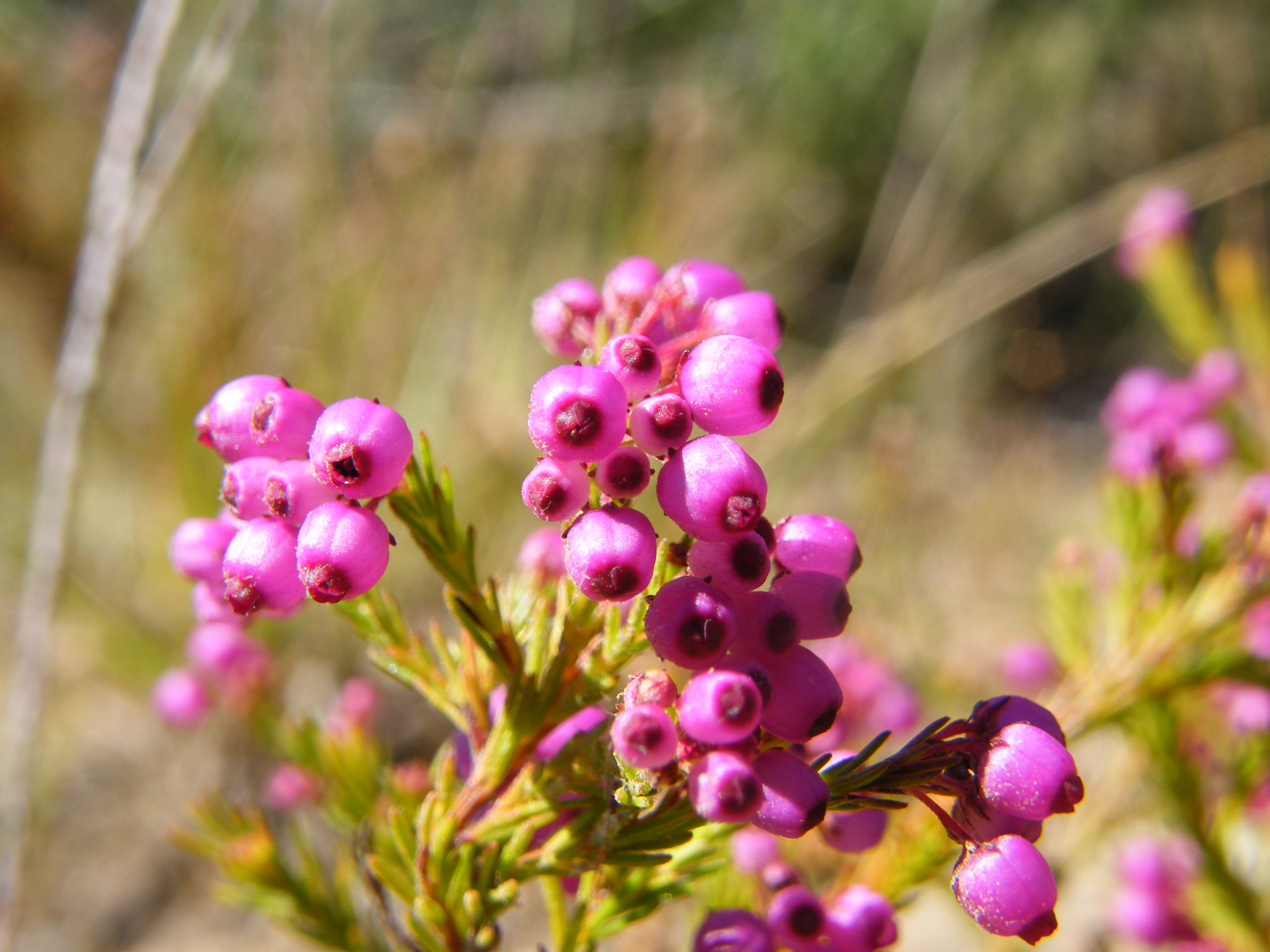

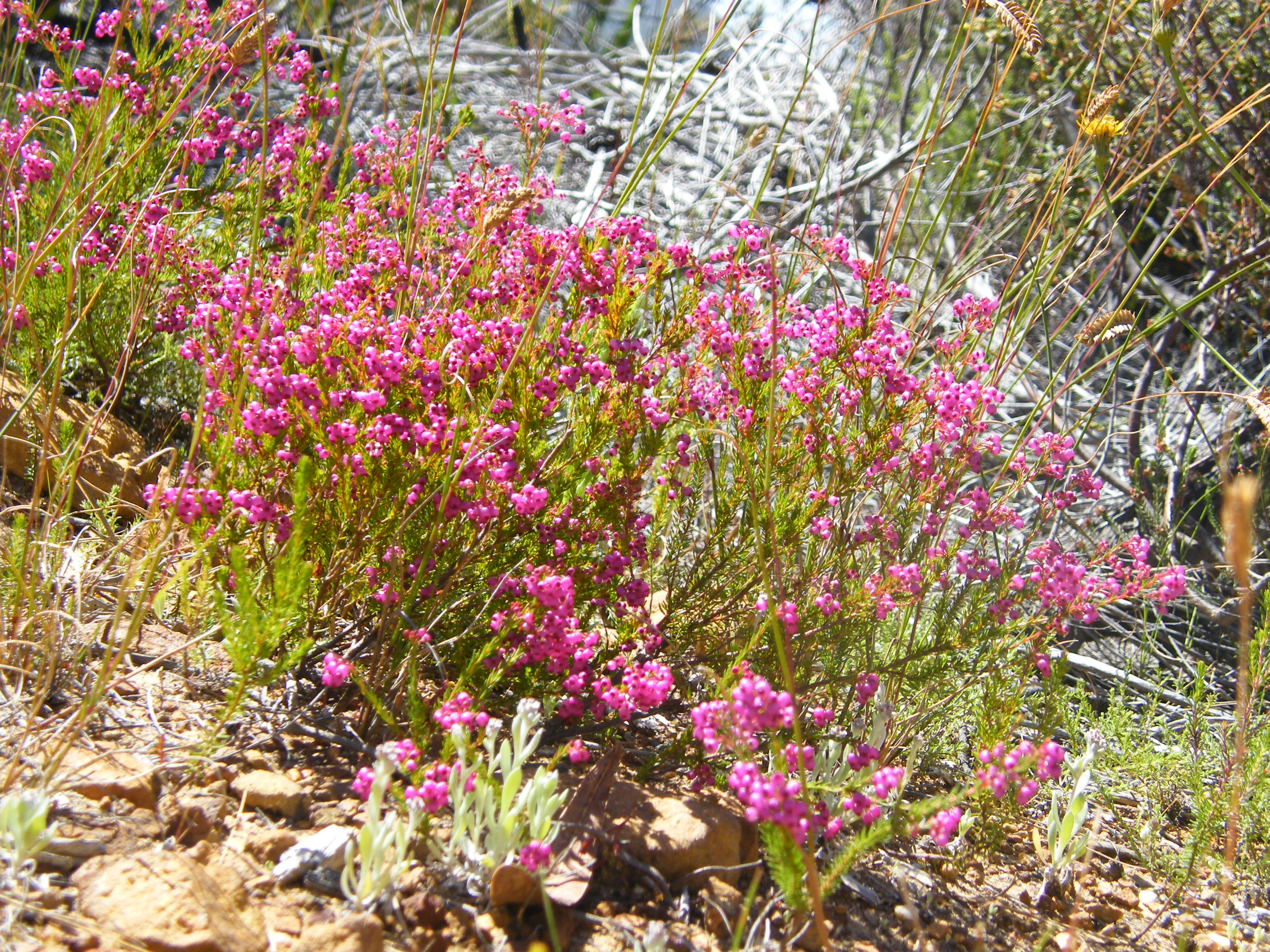

Scientific classification
- Kingdom: Plantae
- Clade: Tracheophytes
- Clade: Angiosperms
- Clade: Eudicots
- Clade: Asterids
- Order: Ericales
- Family: Ericaceae
- Genus: Erica
- Species: E. multumbellifera

Binomial name
- Erica multumbellifera P.J.Bergius, (1767)

Synonyms
- Erica bullularis Salisb.; Erica granulata L.; Erica pilularis P.J.Bergius; Ericoides ramentaceum (L.) Kuntze

= Erica multumbellifera =

Bead Heath

Species of flowering plant

Erica multumbellifera, known by the common name bead heath, is a plant belonging to the genus Erica and is part of the fynbos. It is endemic to the Western Cape.
