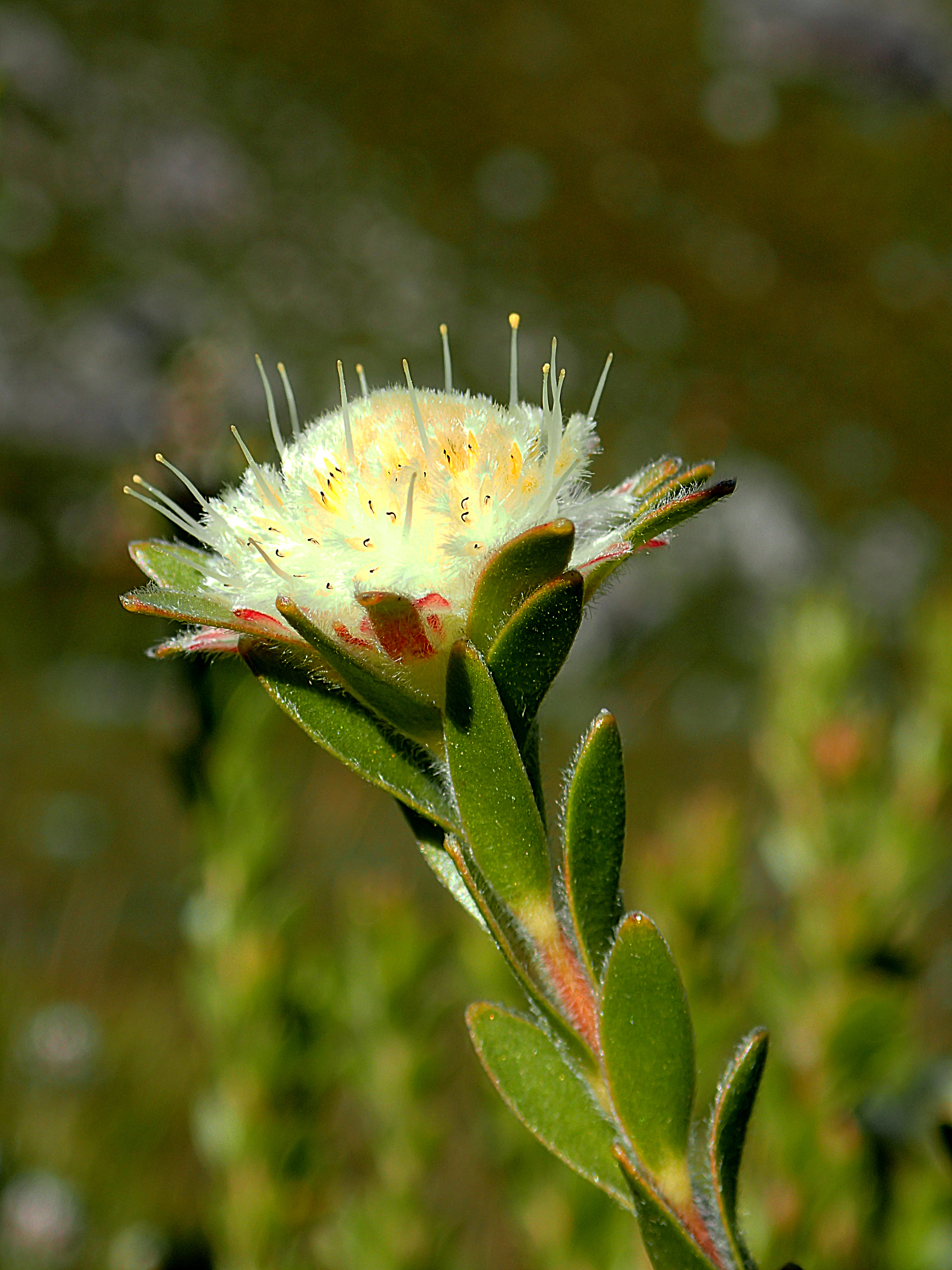

Conservation status
- Least Concern (IUCN 3.1)

Scientific classification
- Kingdom: Plantae
- Clade: Tracheophytes
- Clade: Angiosperms
- Clade: Eudicots
- Order: Proteales
- Family: Proteaceae
- Genus: Diastella
- Species: D. fraterna

Binomial name
- Diastella fraterna Rourke, 1976

= Diastella fraterna =

Palmiet silkypuff; species of plant native to South Africa

Diastella fraterna, commonly known as the palmiet silkypuff, is a species of flowering plant in the family Proteaceae native to South Africa.
