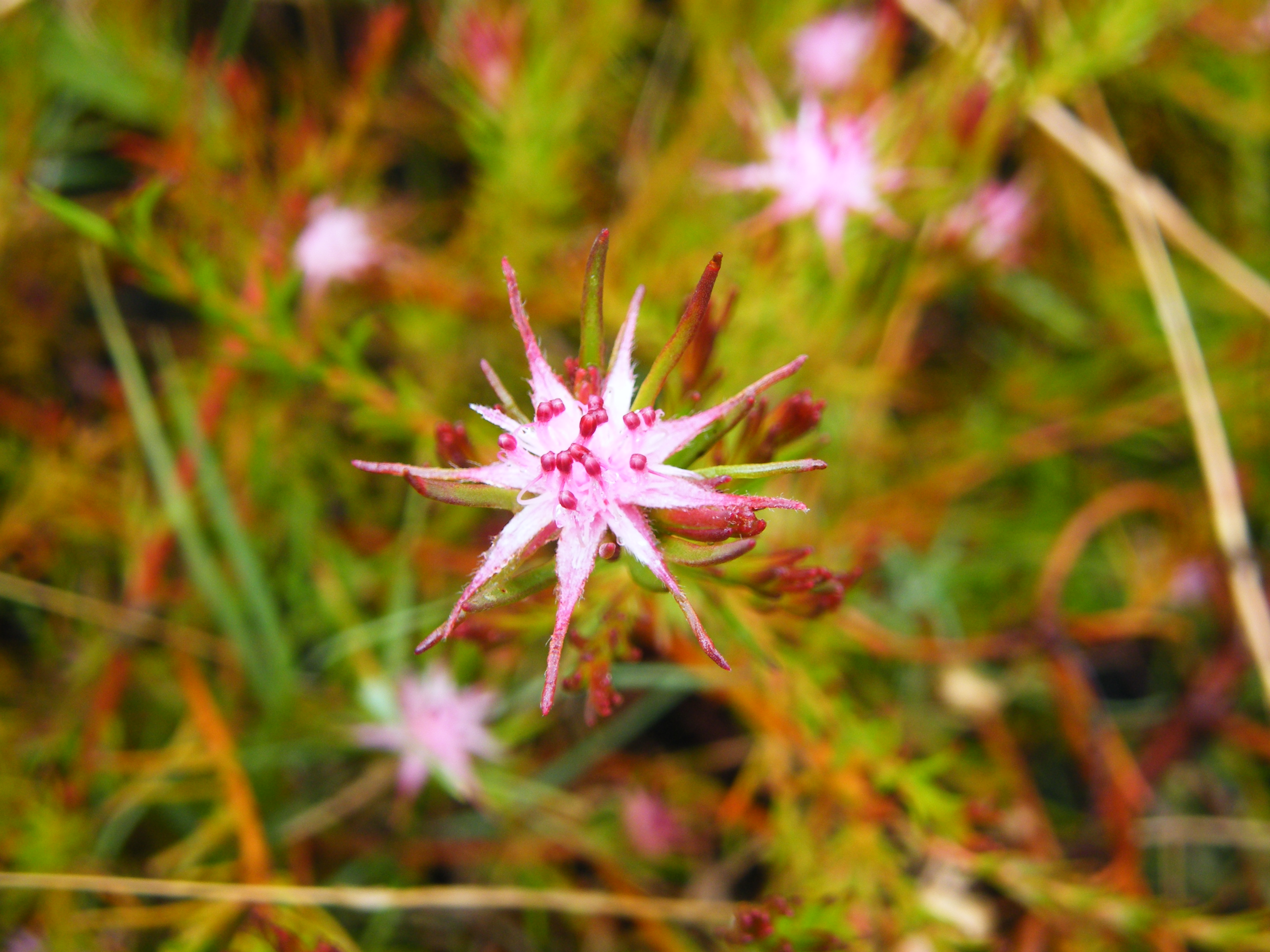

Conservation status
- Endangered (IUCN 3.1)

Scientific classification
- Kingdom: Plantae
- Clade: Tracheophytes
- Clade: Angiosperms
- Clade: Eudicots
- Order: Proteales
- Family: Proteaceae
- Genus: Diastella
- Species: D. proteoides

Binomial name
- Diastella proteoides (L.) Druce

Synonyms
- Leucadendron proteoides L.; Mimetes homomallus Rchb.f. ex Meisn.; Mimetes proteoides (L.) Druce; Mimetes purpureus R.Br.; Protea purpurea L.; Protea salsoloides Thunb. ex Meisn.

= Diastella proteoides =

Species of flowering plant

Diastella proteoides, the Flats silkypuff, is a flower-bearing shrub that belongs to the genus Diastella and forms part of the fynbos. The plant is native to the Western Cape and occurs on the Cape Flats from Tokai to Malmesbury and Eerste River. The shrub is flat and grows only 50 cm high but 3 m in diameter and flowers throughout the year with the peak from July to February.

Fire destroys the plant but the seeds survive. Two months after flowering, the fruit falls off and ants disperse the seeds. They store the seeds in their nests. The plant is unisexual. Pollination takes place through the action of bees. The plant grows in sandy plains at altitudes of 0–150 m.

== Gallery ==
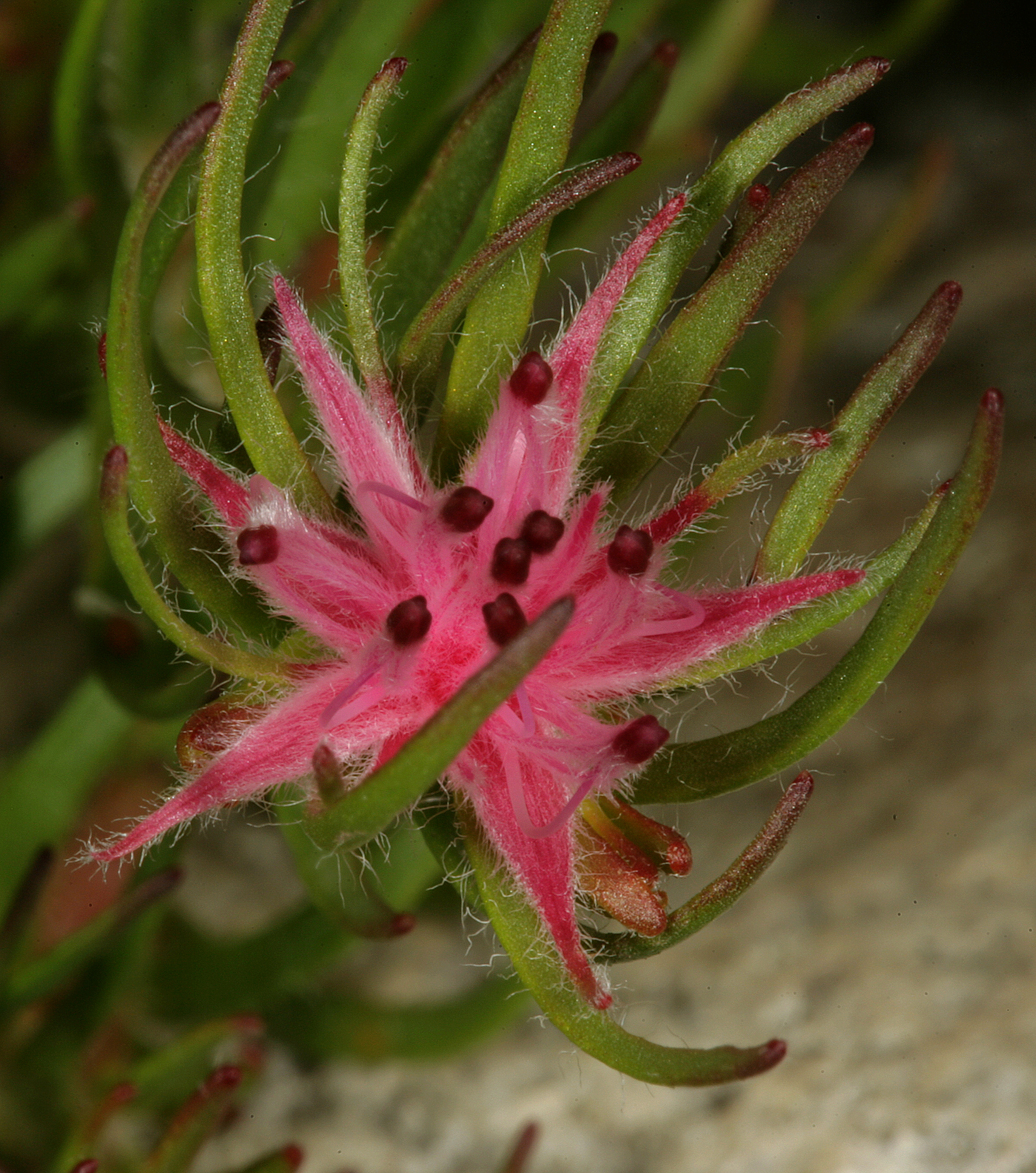

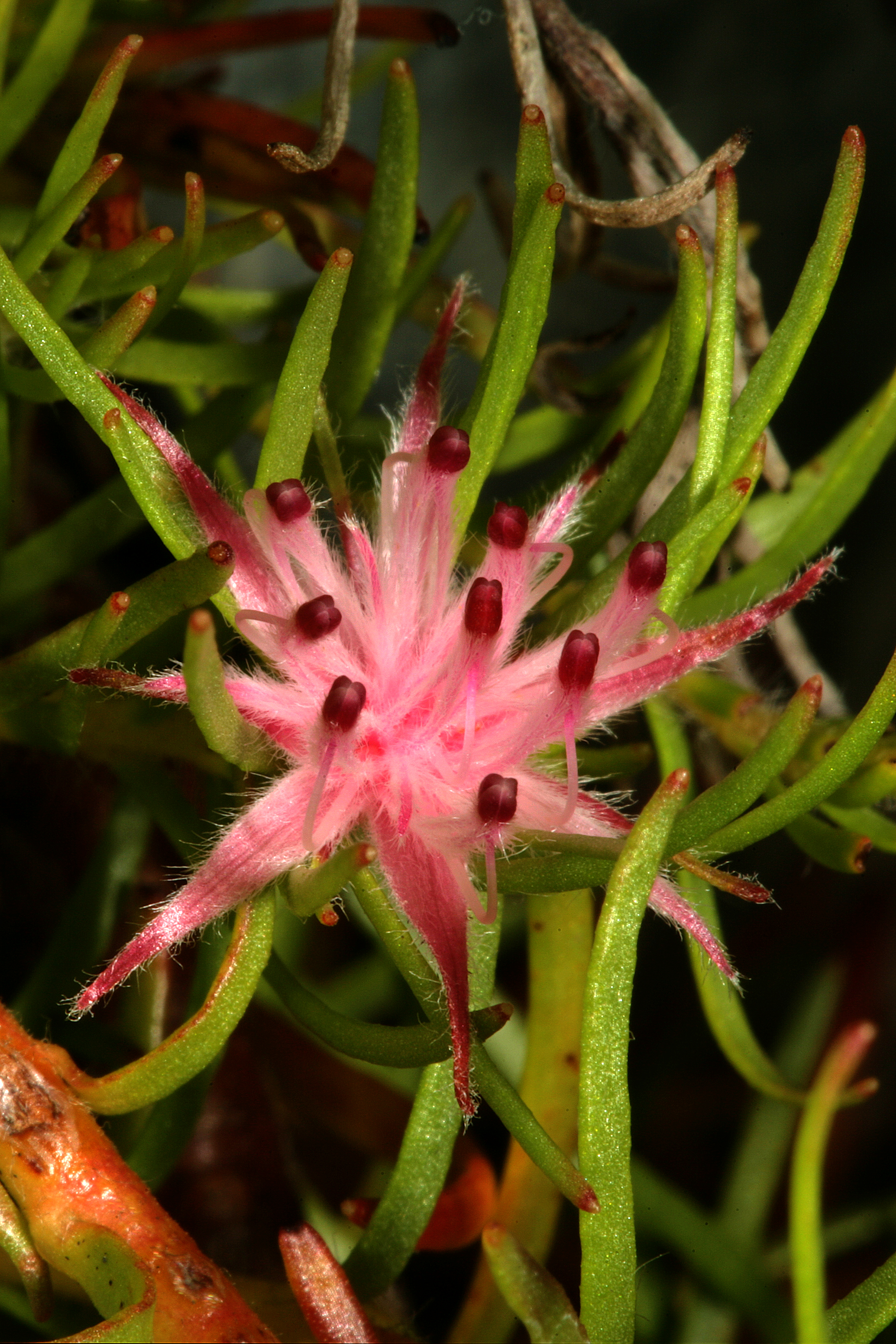

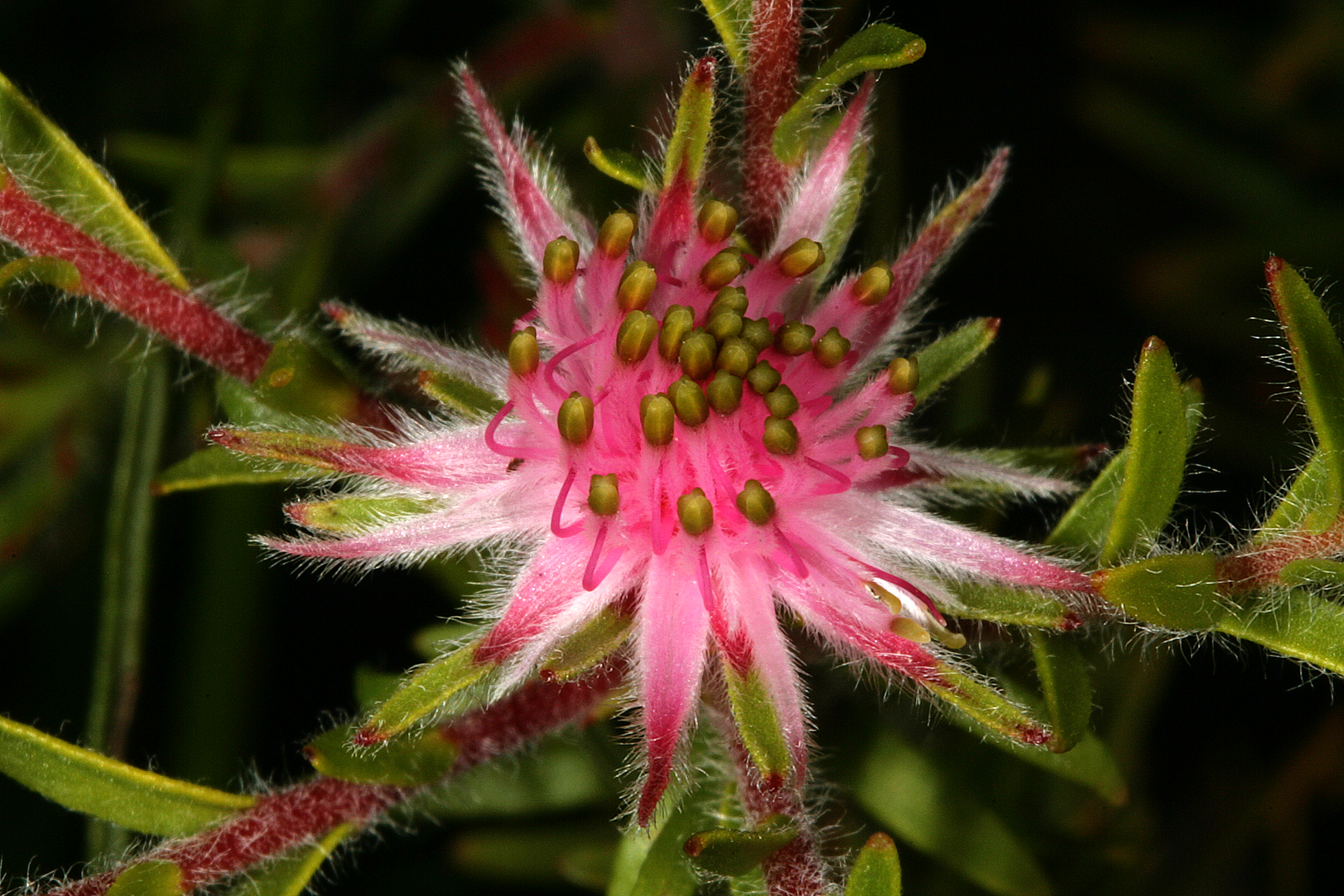

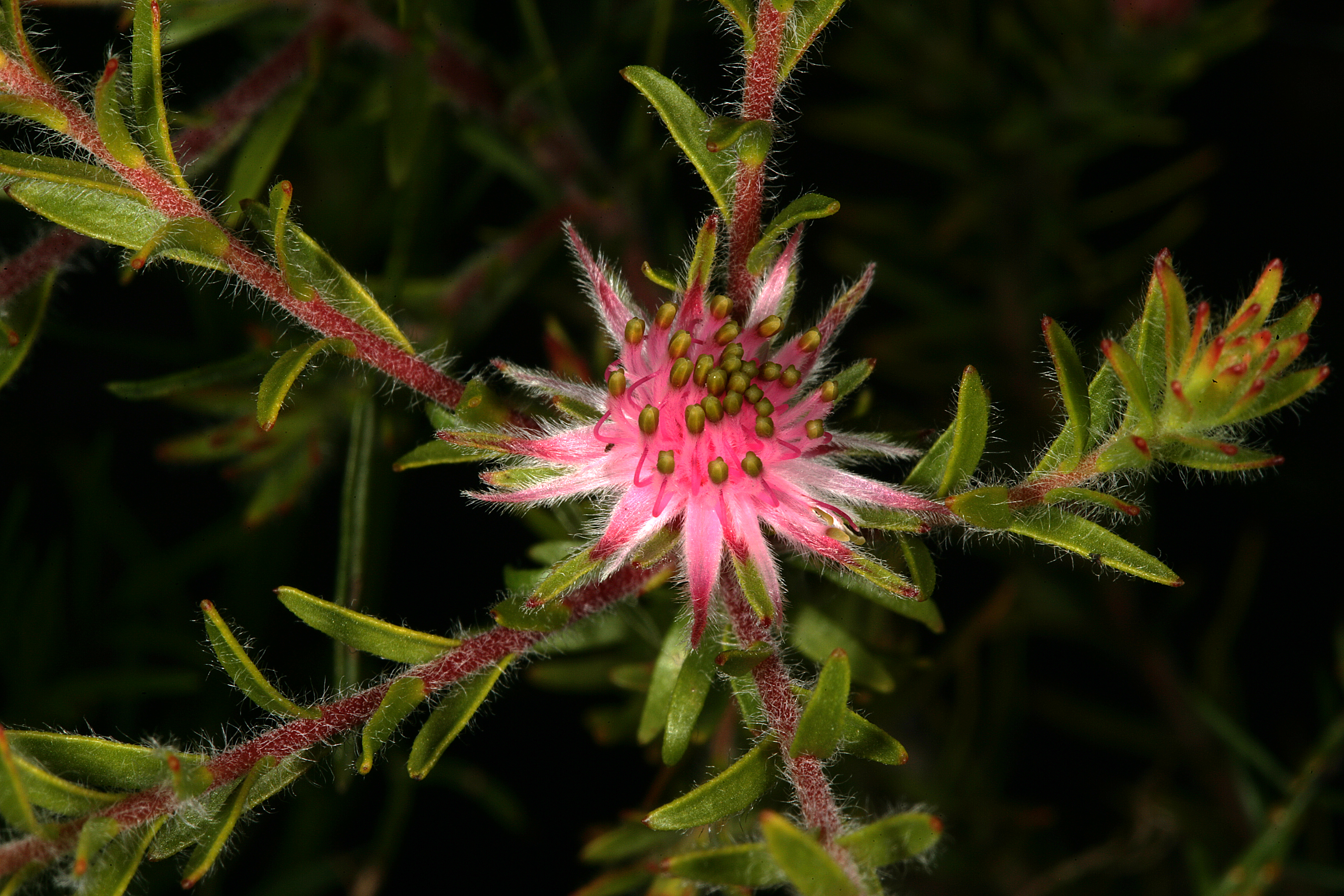

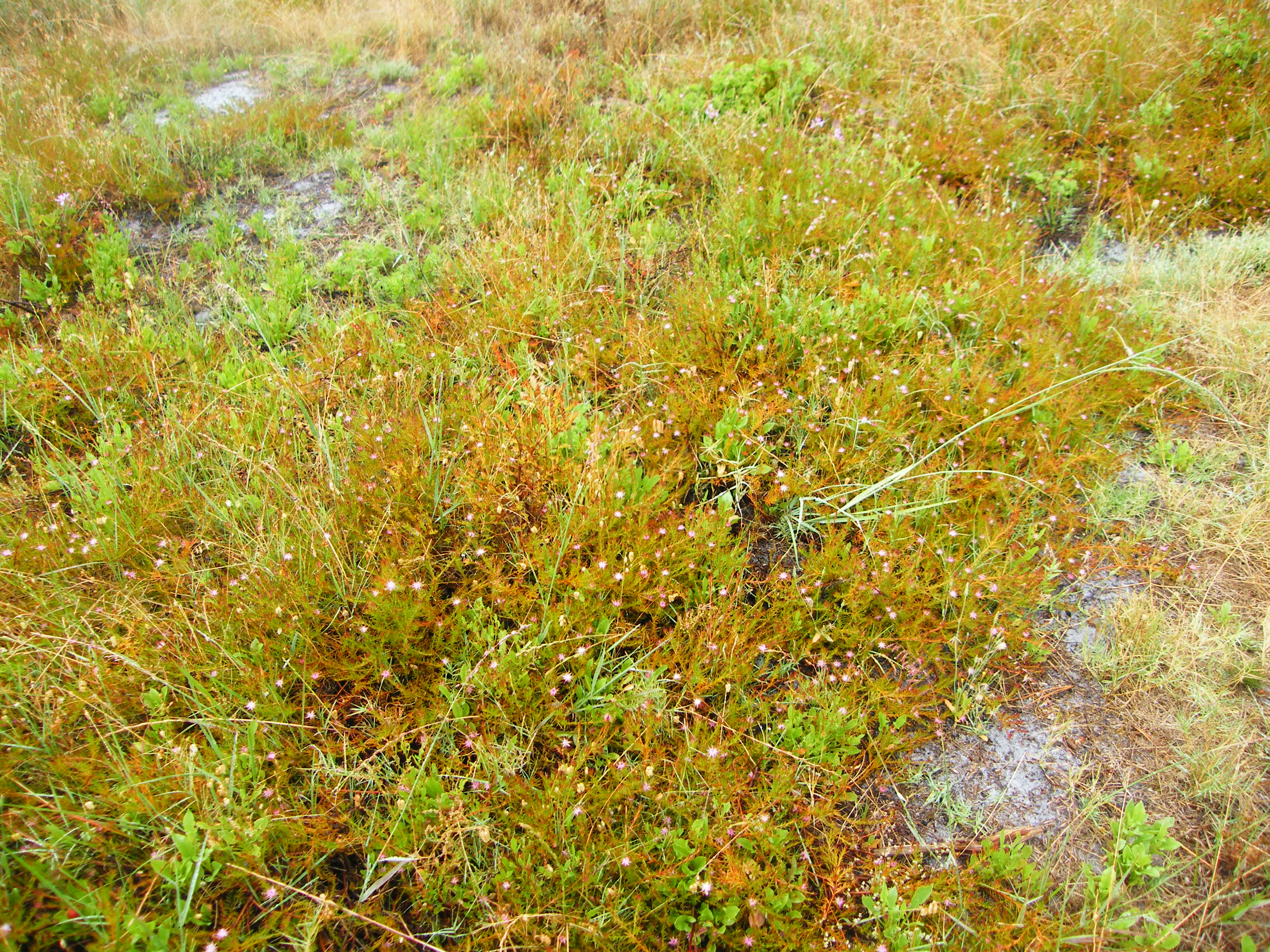

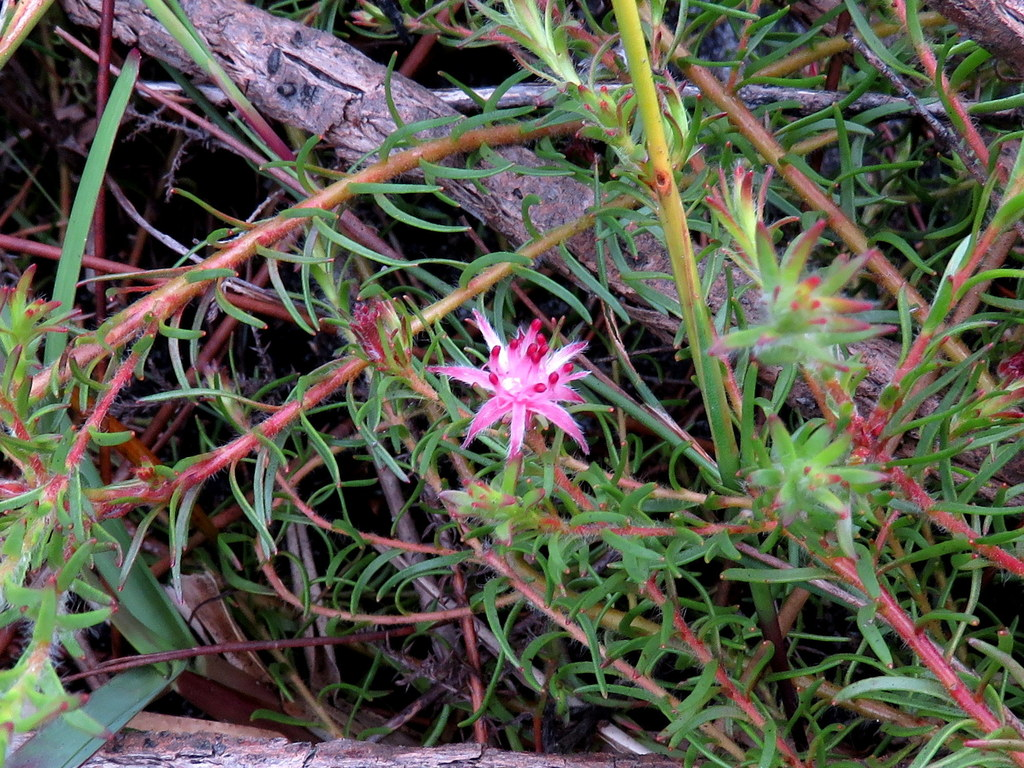
