= Diastella buekii =

Conservation status
- Critically Endangered (IUCN 3.1)

Scientific classification
- Kingdom: Plantae
- Clade: Embryophytes
- Clade: Tracheophytes
- Clade: Angiosperms
- Clade: Eudicots
- Order: Proteales
- Family: Proteaceae
- Genus: Diastella
- Species: D. buekii

Binomial name
- Diastella buekii (Gand.) Rourke

Synonyms
- Mimetes buekii Gand.

Species of flowering plant

Diastella buekii, the Franschhoek silkypuff, is a flower-bearing shrub that belongs to the genus Diastella and forms part of the fynbos. The plant is native to the Western Cape and occurs in the Franschhoek and Wemmershoek valleys. The shrub is flat and grows only 15 cm tall and bears flowers from August to November.

Fire destroys the plant but the seeds survive. Two months after flowering, the fruit falls off and ants disperse the seeds. They store the seeds in their nests. The plant is unisexual. Pollination takes place through the action of bees. The plant grows in moist sand at altitudes of 200–300 m.
