= Diastella myrtifolia =

Conservation status
- Endangered (IUCN 3.1)

Scientific classification
- Kingdom: Plantae
- Clade: Tracheophytes
- Clade: Angiosperms
- Clade: Eudicots
- Order: Proteales
- Family: Proteaceae
- Genus: Diastella
- Species: D. myrtifolia

Binomial name
- Diastella myrtifolia (Thunb.) Salisb. ex Knight

Synonyms
- Mimetes myrtifolius (Thunb.) R.Br.; Protea myrtifolia Thunb.

Species of flowering plant

Diastella myrtifolia, the Tulbagh silkypuff, is a flower-bearing shrub that belongs to the genus Diastella and forms part of the fynbos. The plant is native to the Western Cape and is found in the Groot Winterhoek. The shrub is erect to semi-erect with mat-shaped spreading branches.
