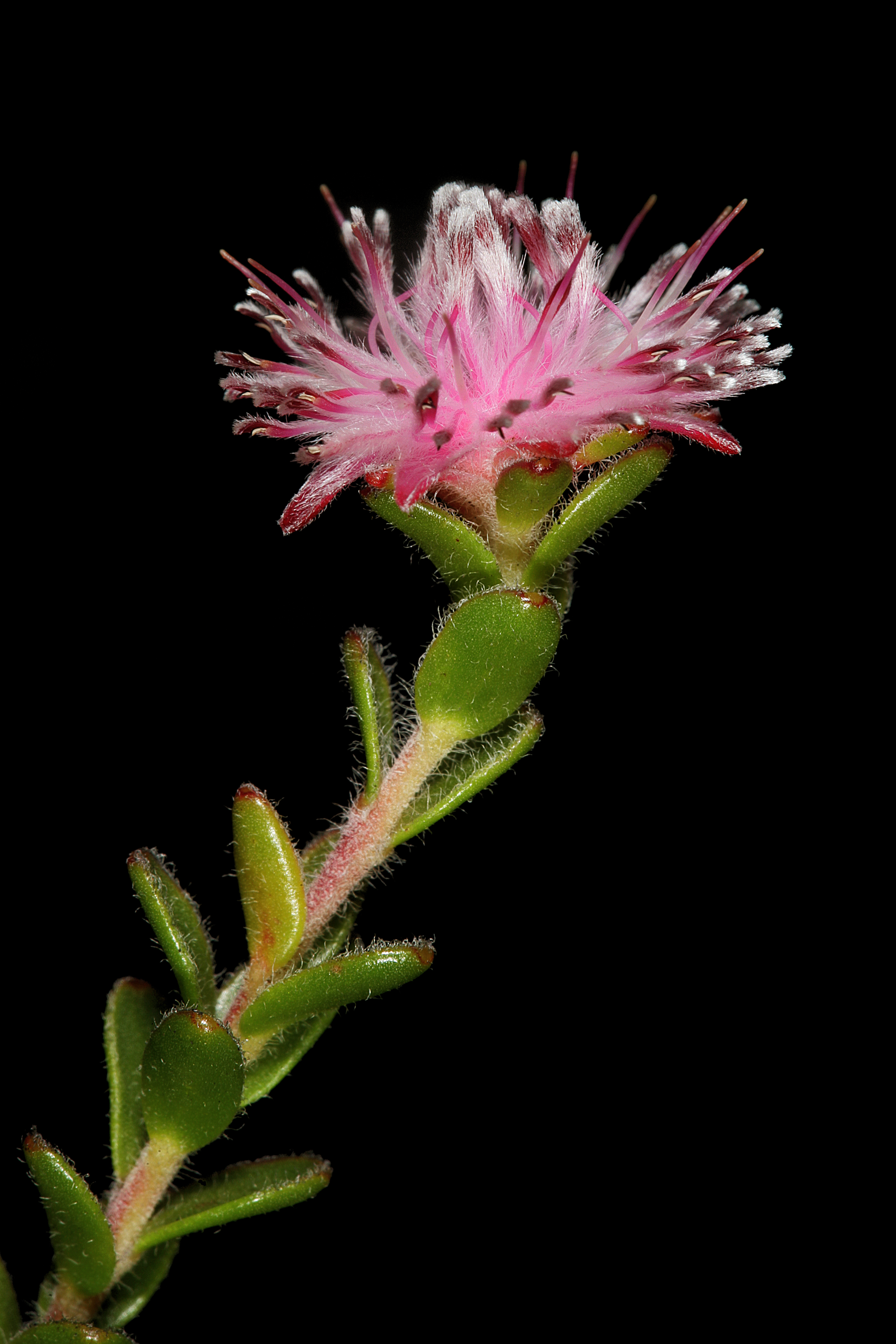
- Diastella divaricata subsp. divaricata

Scientific classification
- Kingdom: Plantae
- Clade: Embryophytes
- Clade: Tracheophytes
- Clade: Spermatophytes
- Clade: Angiosperms
- Clade: Eudicots
- Order: Proteales
- Family: Proteaceae
- Subfamily: Proteoideae
- Tribe: Leucadendreae
- Subtribe: Leucadendrinae
- Genus: Diastella; Salisb., 1809

Species
- See text

= Diastella =

Genus of flowering plants in the protea family

Diastella is a genus containing seven species of flowering plants, commonly known as “silkypuffs”, in the protea family. The name comes from the Greek diastellein “to separate”, with reference to the free perianth lobes – the plants are distinguished from the closely related and similar leucospermums by the possession of four free perianth segments. The genus is endemic to the Cape Floristic Region of South Africa where it has a very limited range and is associated with fynbos habitats. The species are all small shrubs. Most species are threatened.

== Species ==
Described species and subspecies are listed below, with their conservation status:

- Diastella buekii (Gand.) Rourke – Franschhoek silkypuff – CR
- Diastella divaricata (P.J.Bergius) Rourke
  - Diastella divaricata subsp. divaricata – Peninsula silkypuff – Rare
  - Diastella divaricata subsp. montana Rourke – Mountain silkypuff – VU
- Diastella fraterna Rourke – Palmiet silkypuff – Rare
- Diastella myrtifolia (Thunb.) Salisb. ex Knight – Tulbagh silkypuff – CR
- Diastella parilis Salisb. ex Knight – Worcester silkypuff – CR
- Diastella proteoides (L.) Druce – Flats silkypuff – CR
- Diastella thymelaeoides (P.J.Bergius) Rourke
  - Diastella thymelaeoides subsp. thymelaeoides – Steenbras silkypuff – NT
  - Diastella thymelaeoides subsp. meridiana Rourke – Hangklip Silkypuff – VU
