= Diastella parilis =

Conservation status
- Critically Endangered (IUCN 3.1)

Scientific classification
- Kingdom: Plantae
- Clade: Tracheophytes
- Clade: Angiosperms
- Clade: Eudicots
- Order: Proteales
- Family: Proteaceae
- Genus: Diastella
- Species: D. parilis

Binomial name
- Diastella parilis Salisb. ex Knight

Species of flowering plant

Diastella parilis, the Worcester silkypuff, is a flower-bearing shrub that belongs to the genus Diastella and forms part of the fynbos. The plant is native to the Western Cape and occurs in the Breede River Valley from the Elandskloof to the Slanghoek Mountains. The shrub is erect and grows 70 cm tall and bears flowers from July to January.

Fire destroys the plant but the seeds survive. Two months after flowering, the fruit falls off and ants disperse the seeds. They store the seeds in their nests. The plant is unisexual. Pollination takes place through the action of insects. The plant grows on the foothills in sandstone soil at heights of 250–500 m.
