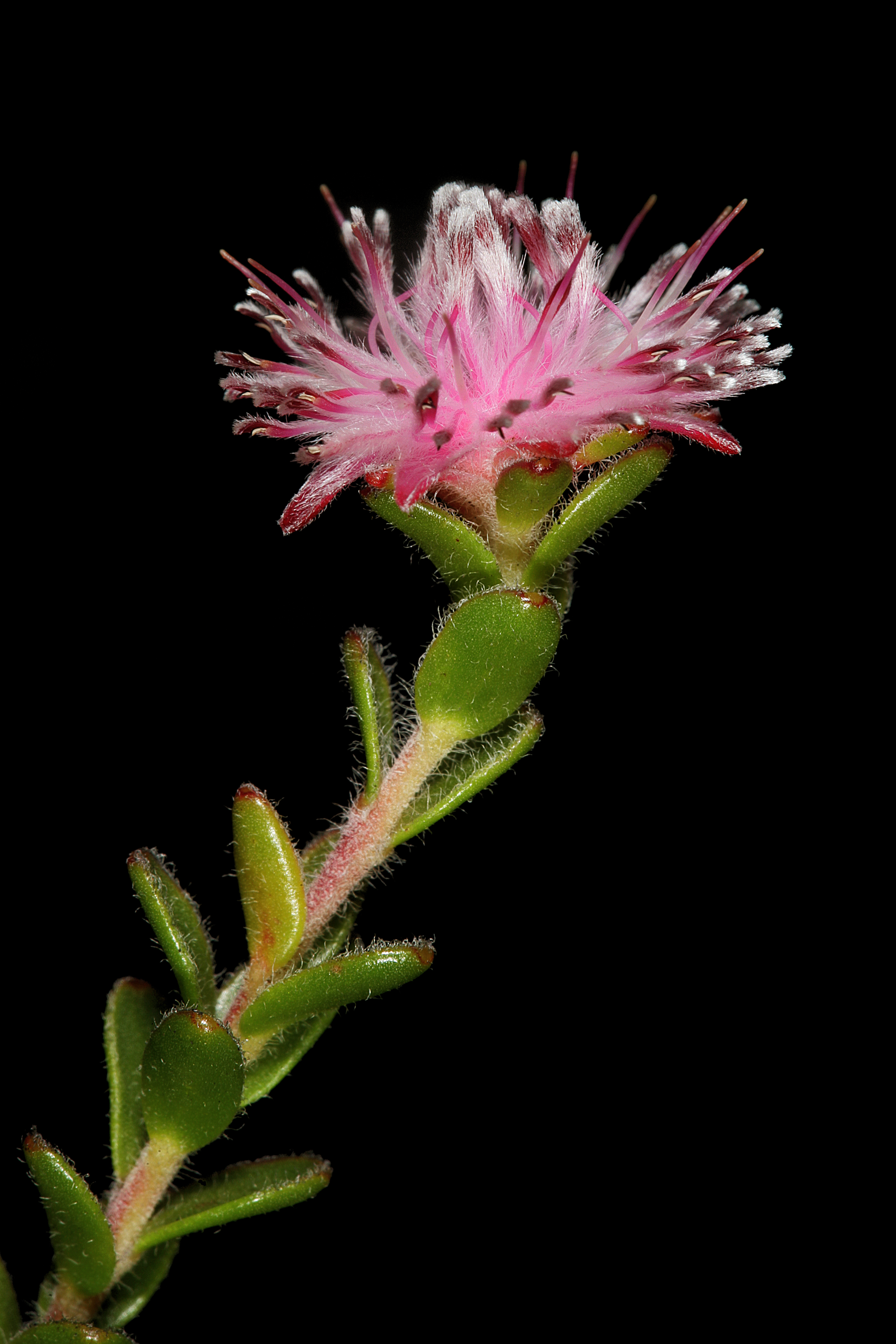

Conservation status
- Least Concern (IUCN 3.1)

Scientific classification
- Kingdom: Plantae
- Clade: Tracheophytes
- Clade: Angiosperms
- Clade: Eudicots
- Order: Proteales
- Family: Proteaceae
- Genus: Diastella
- Species: D. divaricata

Binomial name
- Diastella divaricata (P.J.Bergius) Rourke

Synonyms
- Leucadendron divaricatum P.J.Bergius; Mimetes divaricatus (P.J.Bergius) R.Br.

= Diastella divaricata =

Species of flowering plant

Diastella divaricata is a flower-bearing shrub that belongs to the genus Diastella and forms part of the fynbos. The plant is native to the Western Cape and is found on the Cape Peninsula south of the Silvermine Nature Reserve. The shrub is flat and grows only 50 cm high but 3 m in diameter and flowers throughout the year without an obvious peak.

Fire destroys the plant but the seeds survive. Two months after flowering, the fruit falls off and ants disperse the seeds. They store the seeds in their nests. The plant is unisexual. Pollination takes place through the action of bees. The plant grows in moist sand at altitudes of 0–600 m.
