= Diastella thymelaeoides =

Conservation status
- Near Threatened (IUCN 3.1)

Scientific classification
- Kingdom: Plantae
- Clade: Tracheophytes
- Clade: Angiosperms
- Clade: Eudicots
- Order: Proteales
- Family: Proteaceae
- Genus: Diastella
- Species: D. thymelaeoides

Binomial name
- Diastella thymelaeoides (P.J.Bergius) Rourke

Synonyms
- Leucadendron thymelaeoides P.J.Bergius; Mimetes thymelaeoides (P.J.Bergius) R.Br.

Species of flowering plant

Diastella thymelaeoides is a flower-bearing shrub that belongs to the genus Diastella and forms part of the fynbos. The plant is native to the Western Cape and occurs in the Hottentots Holland Mountains and northern Kogelberg around the Steenbras Dam. The shrub grows upright and grows only 1.5 m tall and flowers throughout the year with a peak from August to November.

Fire destroys the plant but the seeds survive. Two months after flowering, the fruit falls off and ants disperse the seeds. They store the seeds in their nests. The plant is unisexual. Pollination takes place through the action of bees. The plant grows on rocky sandstone slopes at altitudes of 450–900 m.
