= Peter Jonas Bergius =

Swedish botanist (1730–1790)

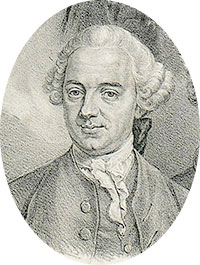
Peter Jonas Bergius, 1847 lithography

Peter Jonas Bergius (13 July 1730 – 10 July 1790) was a Swedish medical doctor and botanist.

In 1758 Bergius was elected a member of the Royal Swedish Academy of Sciences. In 1768 he was elected to membership of the American Philosophical Society. He was elected a Fellow of the Royal Society in 1770 and a Foreign Honorary Member of the American Academy of Arts and Sciences in 1785.

== Works ==
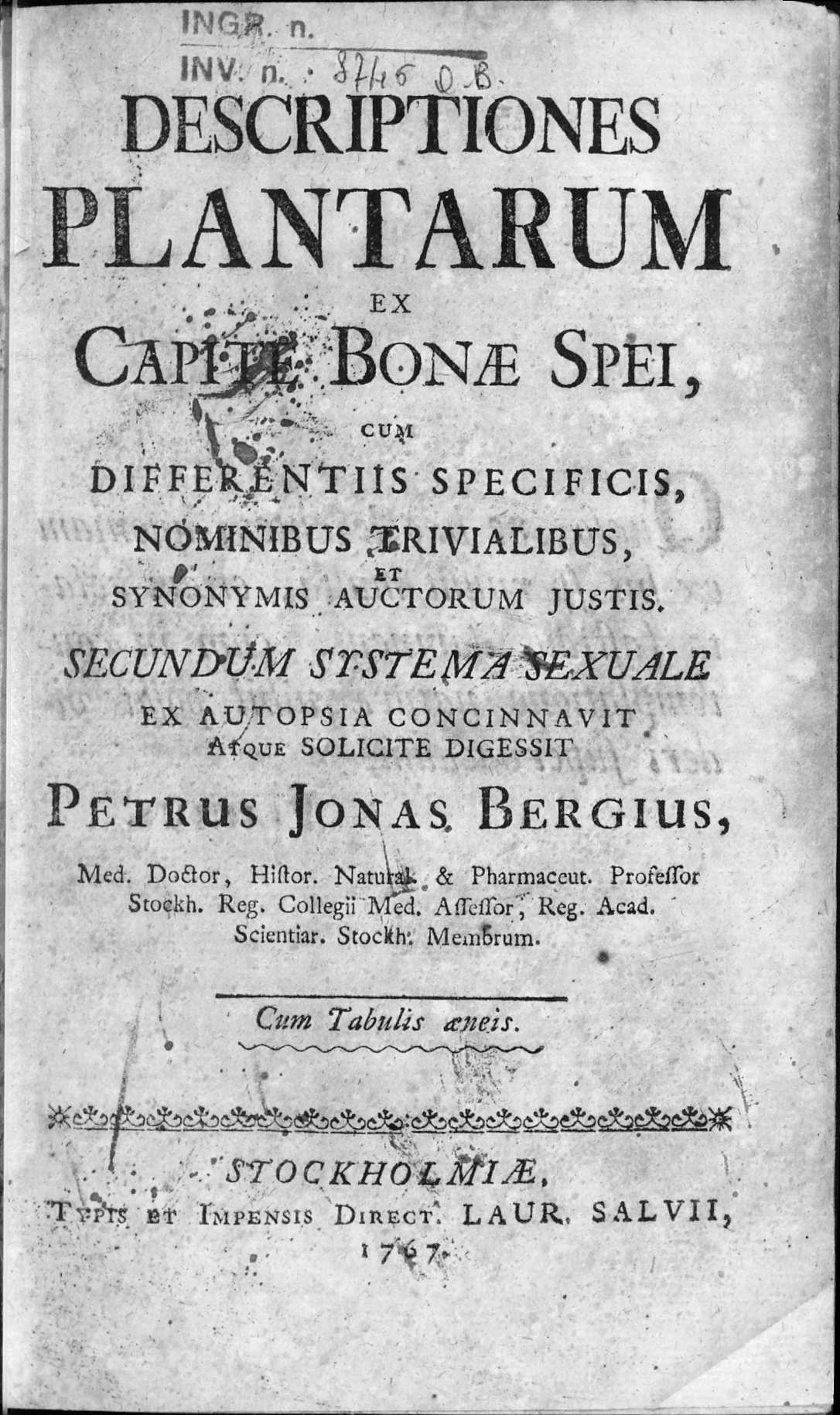
Descriptiones plantarum ex Capite Bonae Spei, 1767

- Descriptiones plantarum ex Capite Bonae Spei (in Latin). Stockholm. 1767 – via Lars Salvius.
