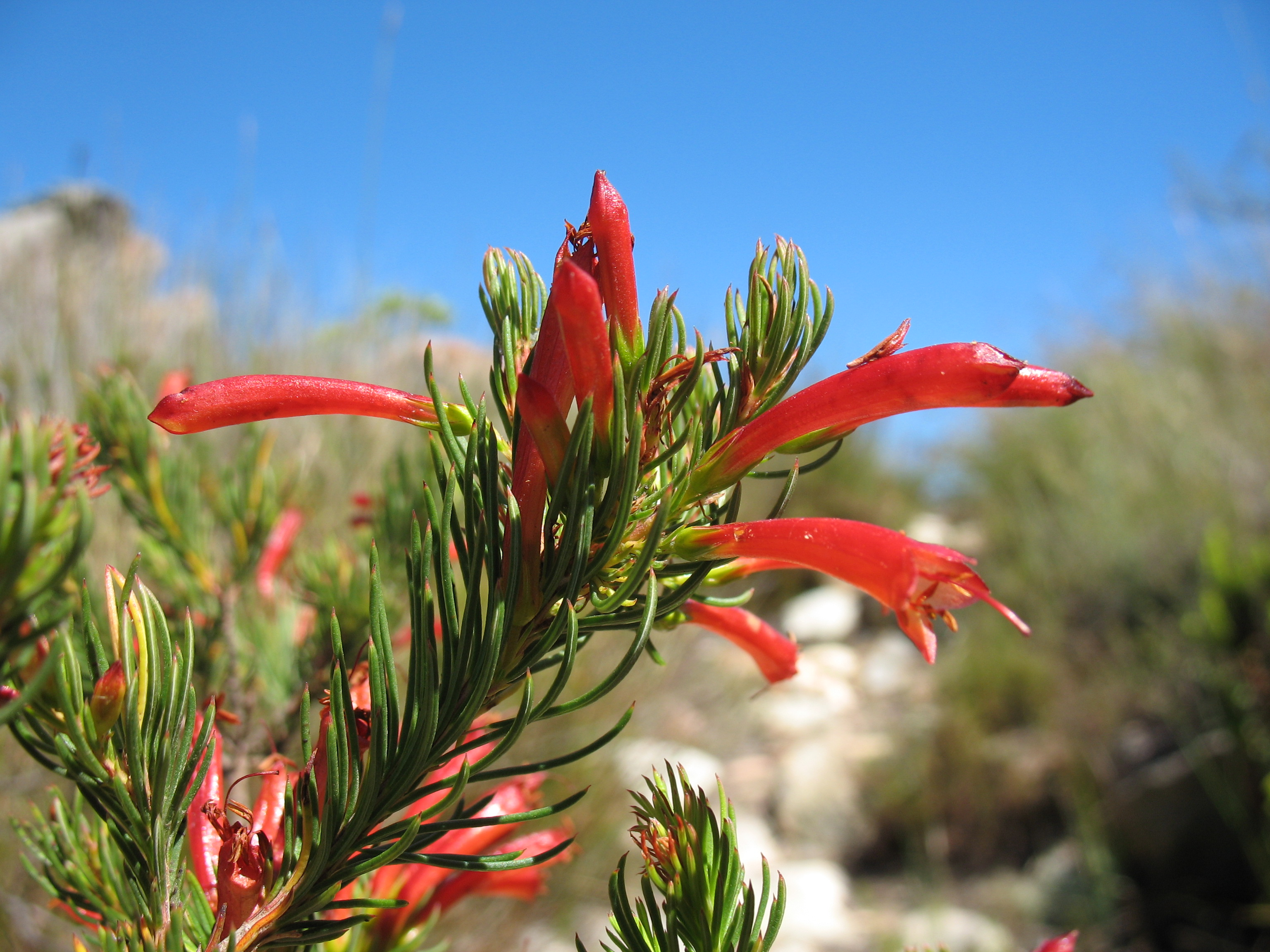

Scientific classification
- Kingdom: Plantae
- Clade: Tracheophytes
- Clade: Angiosperms
- Clade: Eudicots
- Clade: Asterids
- Order: Ericales
- Family: Ericaceae
- Genus: Erica
- Species: E. grandiflora

Binomial name
- Erica grandiflora L.f.

= Erica grandiflora =

Species of flowering plant

Erica grandiflora is a species of Erica found in fynbos on the mainland Western Cape, South Africa. E. grandiflora was described by Carl Linnaeus the Younger in 1782, and was reclassified as Erica abietina subsp. aurantiaca by Oliver & Oliver in 2002. More recently, phylogenetic analyses of DNA sequence data have revealed that it is more closely related to mainland Western Cape species including Erica viscaria than it is to Cape Peninsula endemic Erica abietina subspecies, and should therefore be treated as a separate species. It includes two subspecies which can be most easily distinguished on the basis of their distinctive flower colours.

== Subspecies ==
- Erica grandiflora subsp. grandiflora is widespread in fynbos on the mainland Western Cape. Flowers are reddish-orange. Corresponds to Erica abietina L. ssp. aurantiaca E.G.H.Oliv. & I.M.Oliv.
- Erica grandiflora subsp. perfoliosa (E.G.H.Oliv. & I.M.Oliv.) E.G.H.Oliv. & Pirie. Produces bright yellow flowers. Found only in the Jonkershoek Valley. Critically endangered. Corresponds to Erica abietina L. subsp. perfoliosa E.G.H.Oliv. & I.M.Oliv.

== Gallery ==
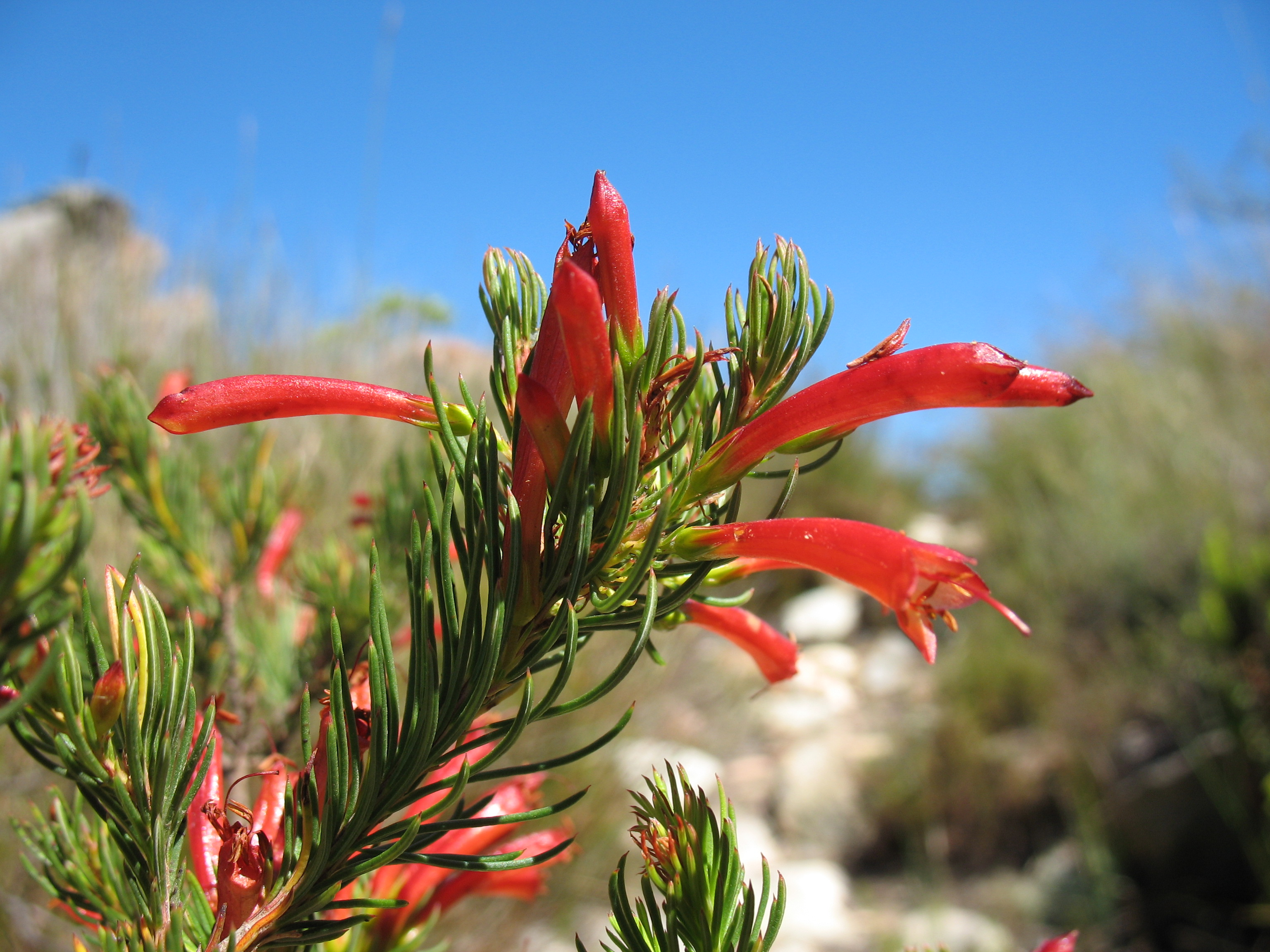
Flowering specimen of E. grandiflora ssp. grandiflora, in the Western Cape, South Africa

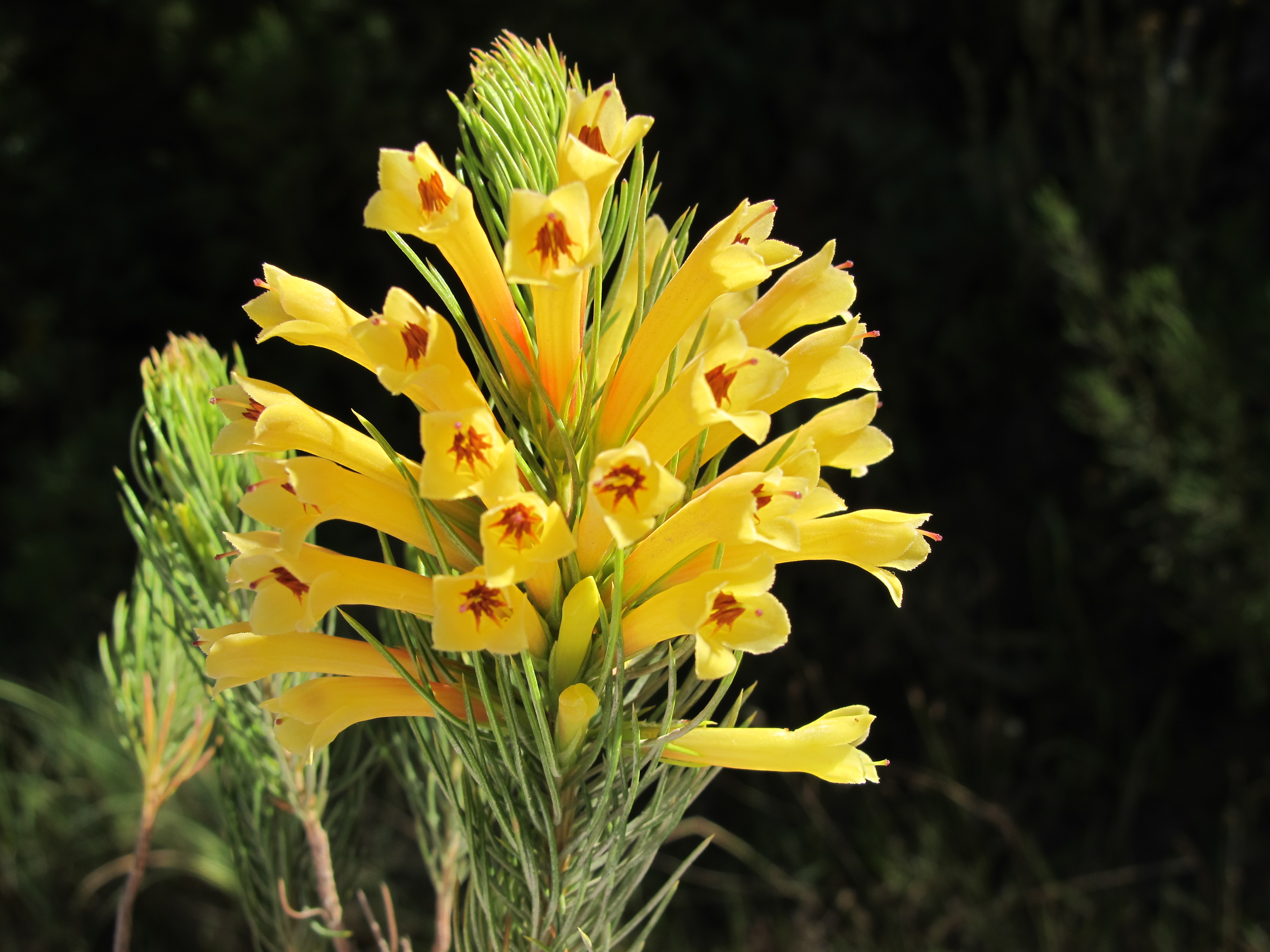
Flowering specimen of E. grandiflora ssp. perfoliosa in the Jonkershoek Valley, Western Cape, South Africa
