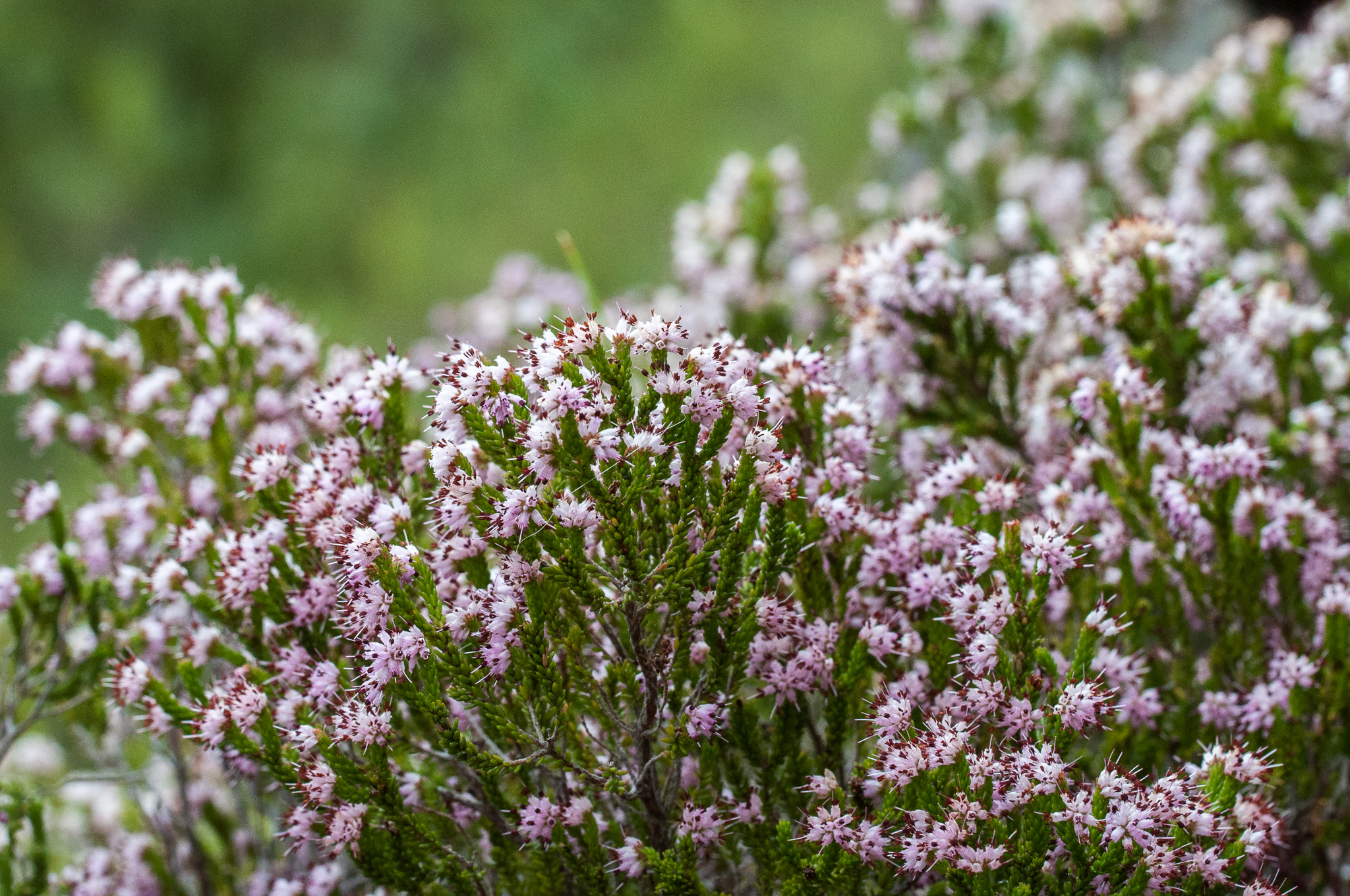

Scientific classification
- Kingdom: Plantae
- Clade: Tracheophytes
- Clade: Angiosperms
- Clade: Eudicots
- Clade: Asterids
- Order: Ericales
- Family: Ericaceae
- Genus: Erica
- Species: E. ericoides

Binomial name
- Erica ericoides (L.) E.G.H.Oliv.

Synonyms
- Blaeria affinis N.E.Br.; Blaeria ericoides L.; Erica blaeria Thunb.; Erica orbicularis G.Lodd.

= Erica ericoides =

Species of flowering plant

Erica ericoides, the honey heath, is a plant belonging to the genus Erica and forming part of the fynbos. The species is endemic to the Western Cape.
