= Disa linderiana =

Scientific classification
- Kingdom: Plantae
- Clade: Tracheophytes
- Clade: Angiosperms
- Clade: Monocots
- Order: Asparagales
- Family: Orchidaceae
- Subfamily: Orchidoideae
- Genus: Disa
- Species: D. linderiana

Binomial name
- Disa linderiana Bytebier & E.G.H.Oliv.

Species of flowering plant

Disa linderiana is a perennial plant and geophyte belonging to the genus Disa and is part of the fynbos. The plant is endemic to the Western Cape and occurs on mountain peaks in the Cederberg, Riviersonderend Mountains and the Groot Swartberg. There are only three subpopulations. The plant does not require fires to flower and is considered rare.
