= Erica evansii =

Scientific classification
- Kingdom: Plantae
- Clade: Tracheophytes
- Clade: Angiosperms
- Clade: Eudicots
- Clade: Asterids
- Order: Ericales
- Family: Ericaceae
- Genus: Erica
- Species: E. evansii

Binomial name
- Erica evansii (N.E.Br.) E.G.H.Oliv.

Synonyms
- Philippia evansii N. E. Br.

Species of plant

Erica evansii is a species of plant in the family Ericaceae found in Mozambique, South Africa, and Zimbabwe.
