= Erica vallis-aranearum =

Scientific classification
- Kingdom: Plantae
- Clade: Tracheophytes
- Clade: Angiosperms
- Clade: Eudicots
- Clade: Asterids
- Order: Ericales
- Family: Ericaceae
- Genus: Erica
- Species: E. vallis-aranearum

Binomial name
- Erica vallis-aranearum E.G.H.Oliv.

Species of flowering plant

Erica vallis-aranearum is a plant belonging to the genus Erica and is part of the fynbos. The species is endemic to the Western Cape and occurs in the Kogelberg. The plant is naturally rare and there is only one population of fifteen plants.
