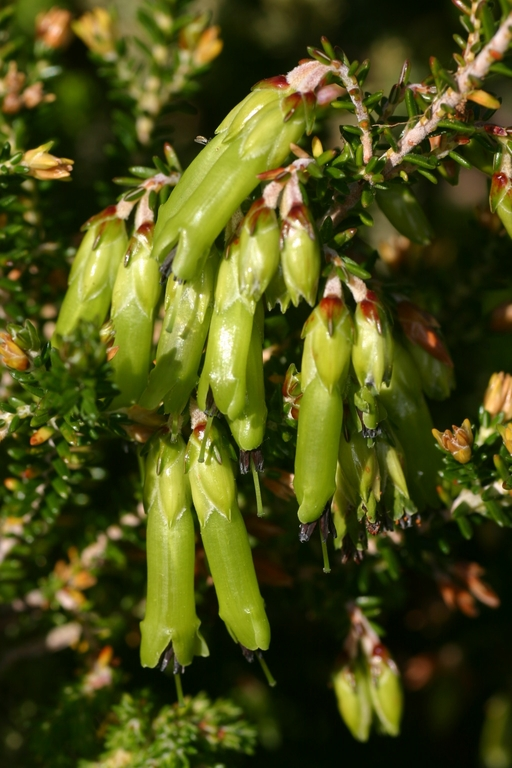

Scientific classification
- Kingdom: Plantae
- Clade: Tracheophytes
- Clade: Angiosperms
- Clade: Eudicots
- Clade: Asterids
- Order: Ericales
- Family: Ericaceae
- Genus: Erica
- Species: E. viridiflora

Binomial name
- Erica viridiflora Andrews

Synonyms
- Erica clavata Andrews; Ericoides viridiflorum (Andrews) Kuntze; Syringodea clavata (Andrews) G.Don; Syringodea viridiflora G.Don

= Erica viridiflora =

Species of flowering plant

Erica viridiflora is a plant belonging to the genus Erica. The species is endemic to the Western Cape.

The plant also has two subspecies:

- Erica viridiflora subsp. primulina (Bolus) E.G.H.Oliv. & I.M.Oliv.
- Erica viridiflora subsp. redacta E.G.H.Oliv. & I.M.Oliv.
