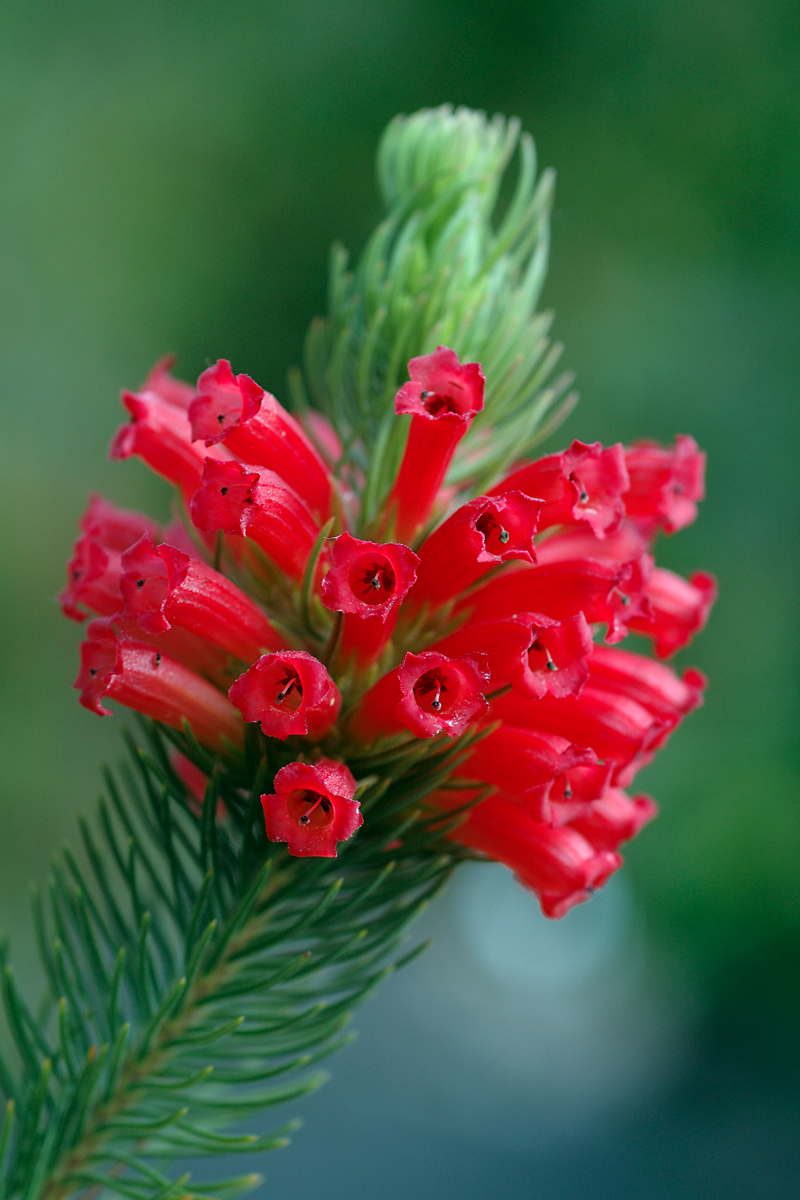

Scientific classification
- Kingdom: Plantae
- Clade: Tracheophytes
- Clade: Angiosperms
- Clade: Eudicots
- Clade: Asterids
- Order: Ericales
- Family: Ericaceae
- Genus: Erica
- Species: E. abietina

Binomial name
- Erica abietina L.

= Erica abietina =

Species of flowering plant

Erica abietina, the honeysuckle heath, is a species of erica that is endemic to the Cape Peninsula of the Western Cape, South Africa. E. abietina includes four subspecies with often highly restricted distributions and distinctive flower colours. Previous delimitation of the species has included a further three subspecies which proved to be more distantly related to Cape Peninsula endemic E. abietina subspecies and are now classified under Erica grandiflora L.f. (Erica abietina subsp. aurantiaca E.G.H.Oliv. & I.M.Oliv.; Erica abietina subsp. perfoliosa E.G.H.Oliv. & I.M.Oliv.) and Erica situshiemalis E.G.H.Oliv. & Pirie.

== Subspecies ==
- Erica abietina subsp. abietina (or the red heath) is restricted to the Peninsula Sandstone Fynbos on Table Mountain, Cape Town. It produces rich-red flowers and grows up to about 1.5 metres (4 ft 11 in) in height.
- Erica abietina subsp. atrorosea E.G.H.Oliv. & I.M.Oliv. (or the wine-red heath) is found only in the southern parts of Peninsula Sandstone Fynbos on the Cape Peninsula, Cape Town. It produces pinkish-purple flowers and grows up to about 1 metre (3 ft 3 in).
- Erica abietina subsp. constantiana E.G.H.Oliv. & I.M.Oliv. (or the Constantiaberg heath) is restricted to the Peninsula Sandstone Fynbos in the middle of the Cape Peninsula between Constantiaberg and Chapmans Peak. It forms a small, dense shrub with bright pink flowers.
- Erica abietina subsp. diabolis E.G.H.Oliv. & I.M.Oliv. (or the devils heath) Critically endangered

This plant grows very easily and well in urban capetonian gardens and is increasingly popular as an ornamental plant.

== Gallery ==
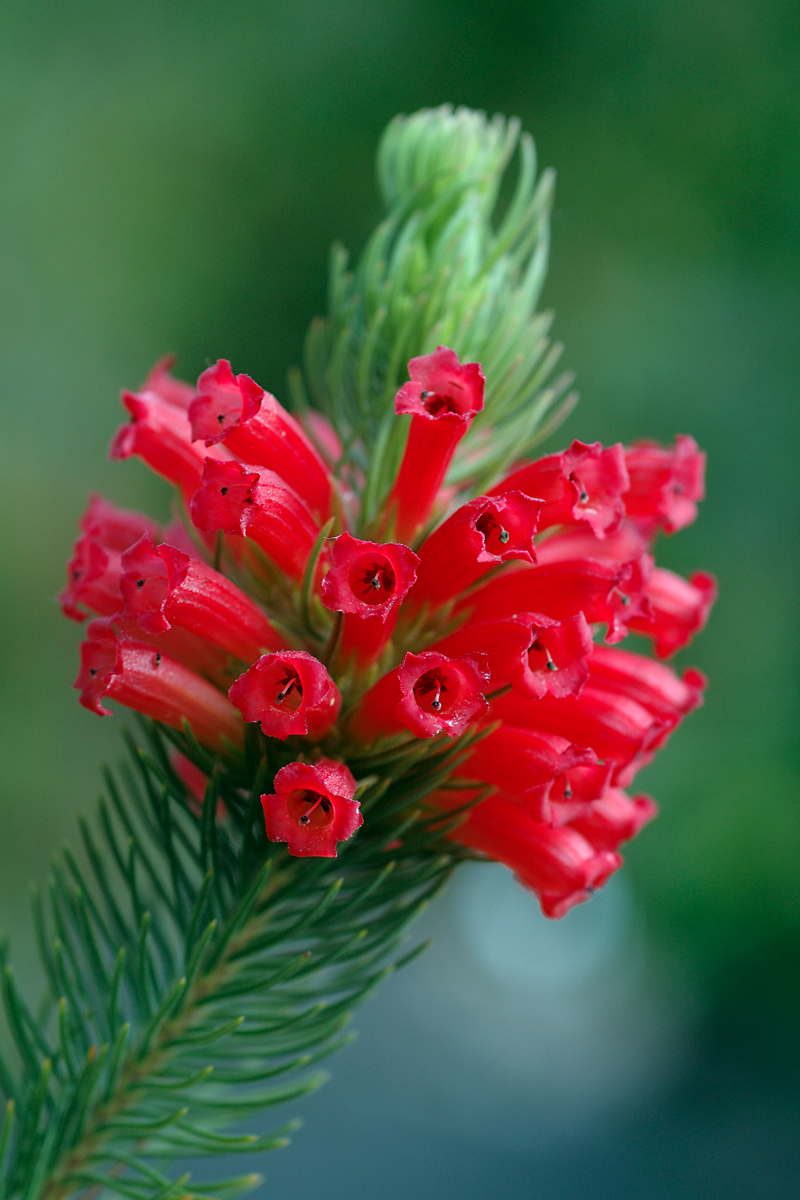
Flowering specimen of E. abietina ssp. abietina

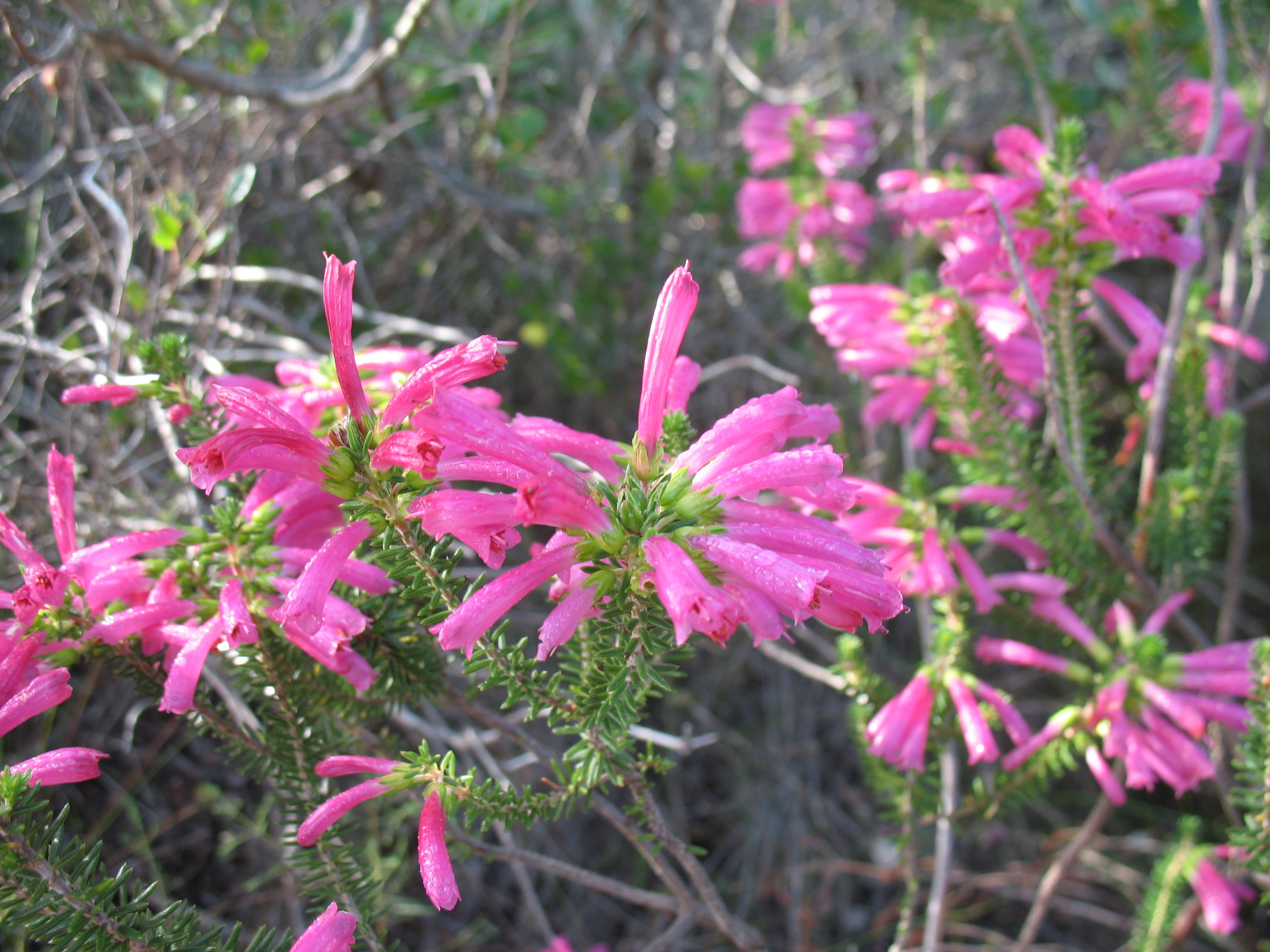
Flowering specimen of E. abietina ssp. atrorosea, in Table Mountain National Park, Western Cape, South Africa

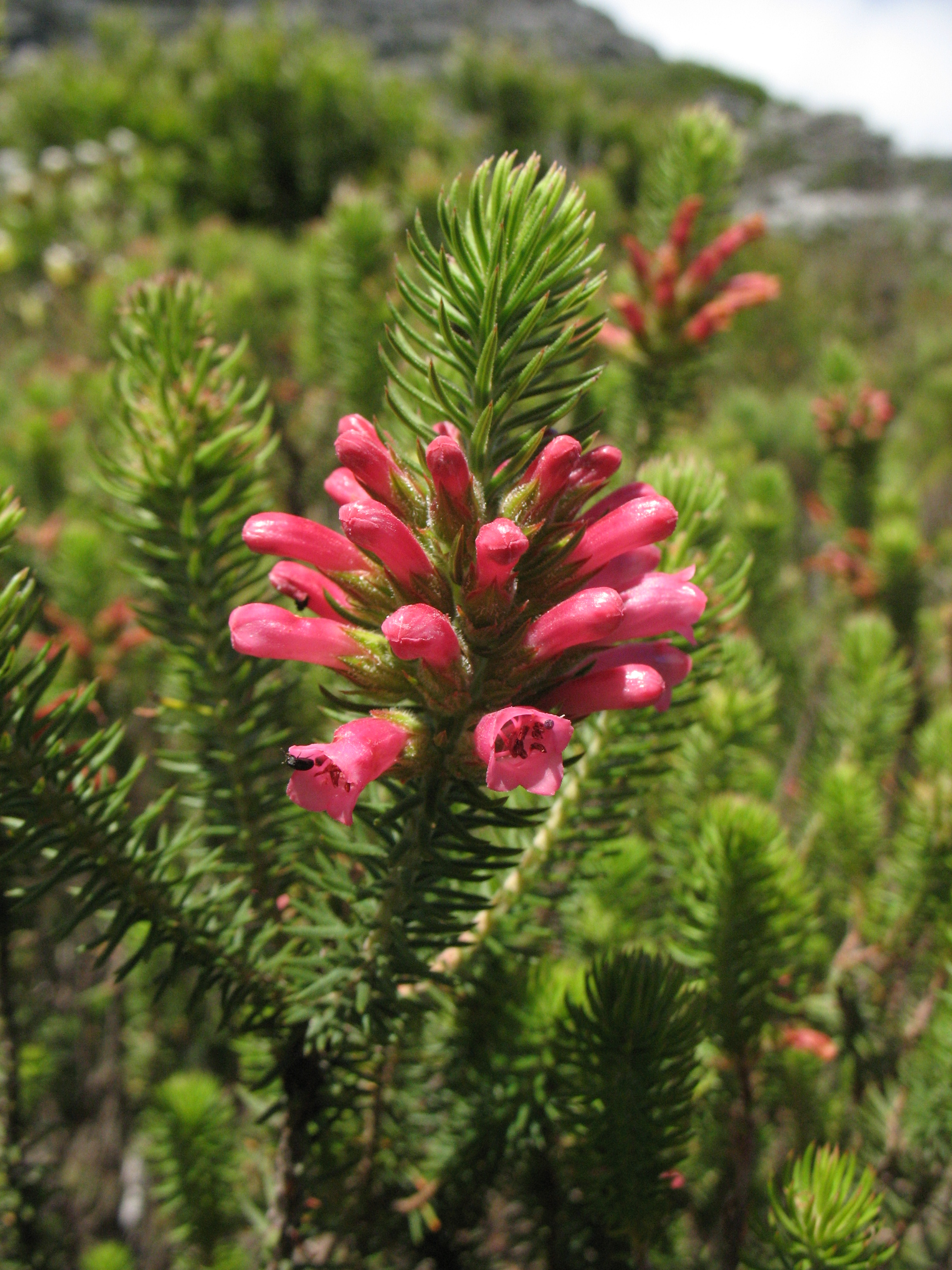
Flowering specimen of E. abietina ssp. diabolis, in Table Mountain National Park, Western Cape, South Africa

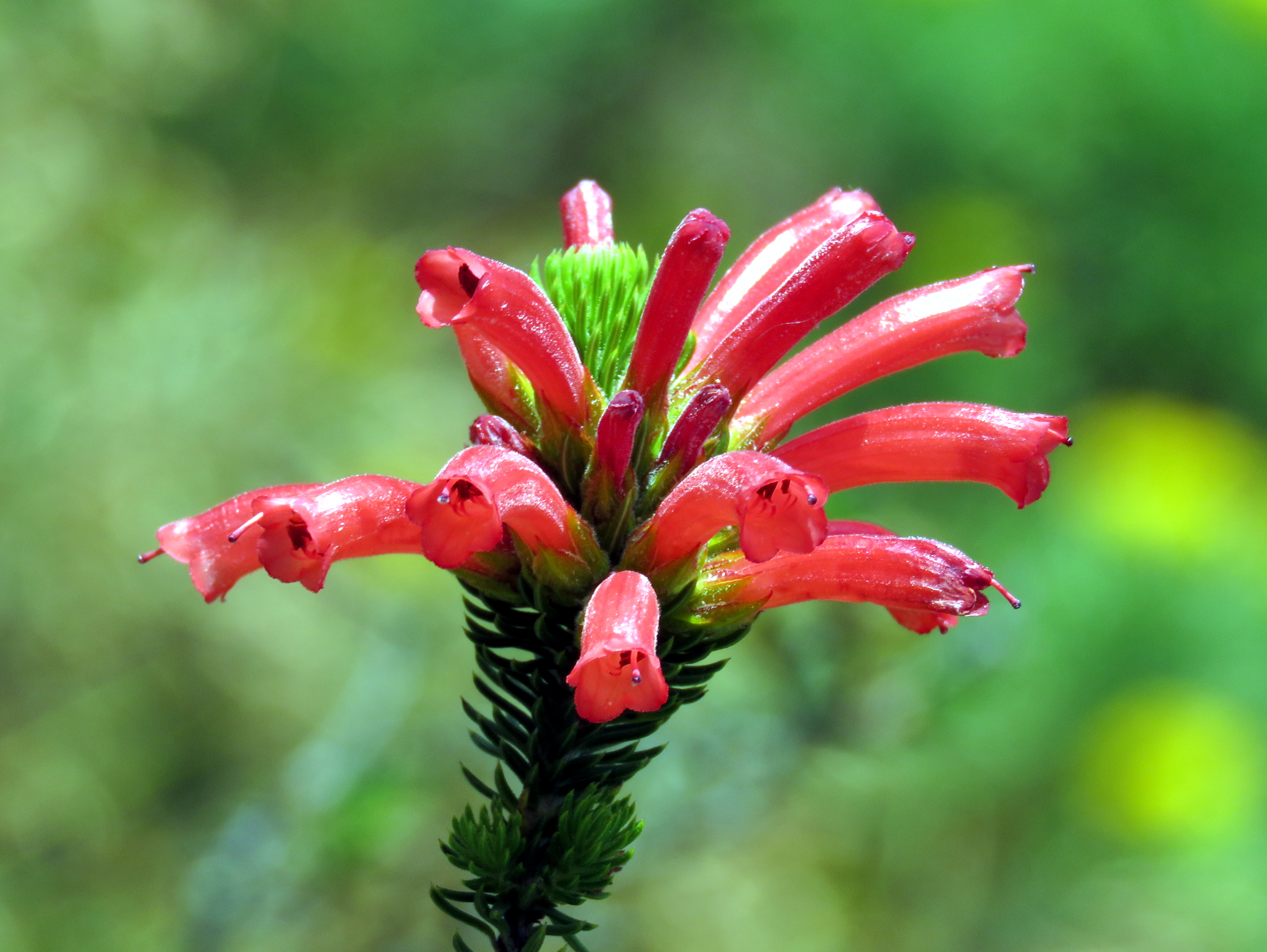
Close up image of E. abietina, Cape area, South Africa.

== See also ==
- Cape Flats Sand Fynbos
- Kenilworth Racecourse Conservation Area
- Biodiversity of Cape Town
