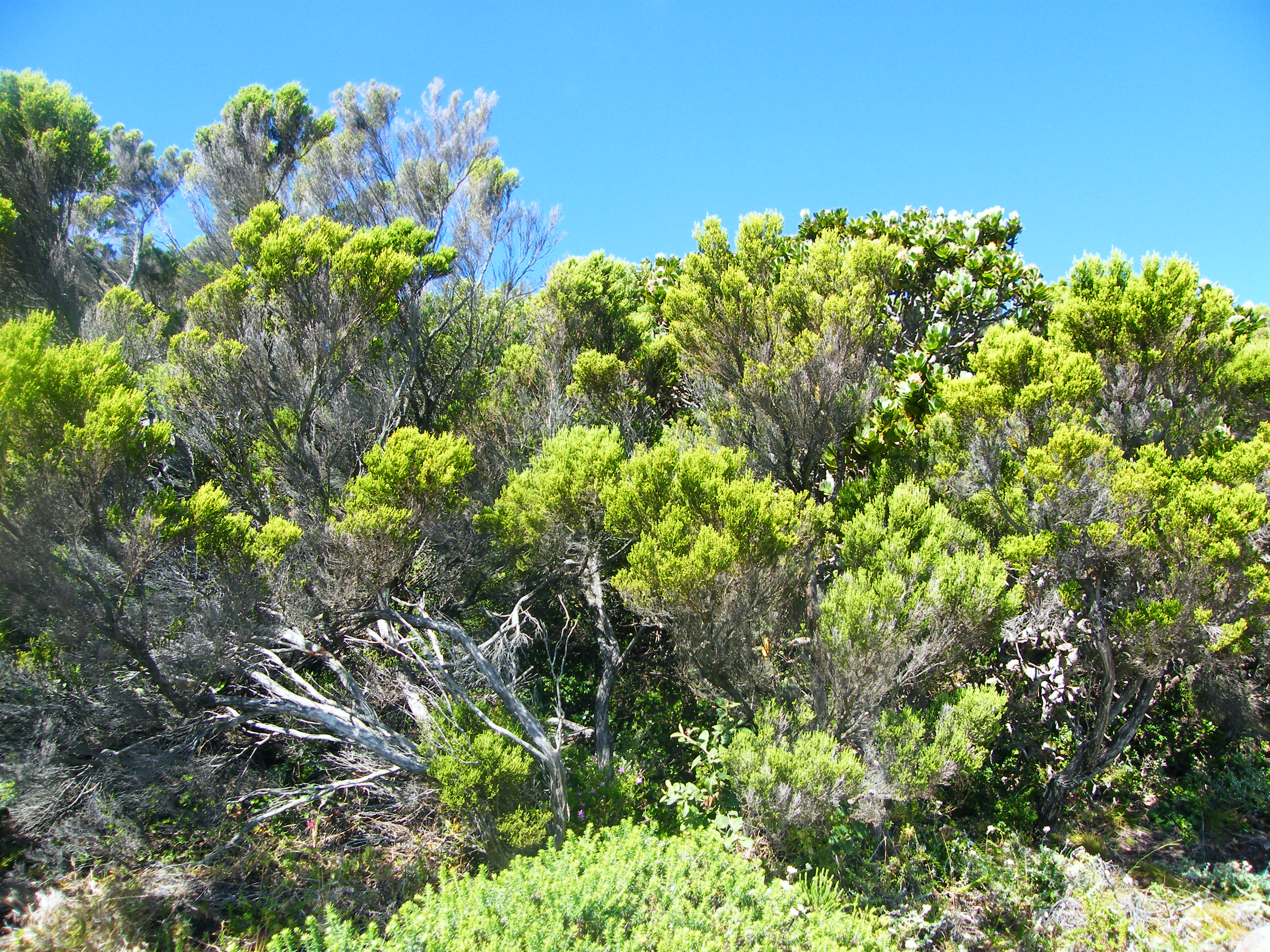

Scientific classification
- Kingdom: Plantae
- Clade: Tracheophytes
- Clade: Angiosperms
- Clade: Eudicots
- Clade: Asterids
- Order: Ericales
- Family: Ericaceae
- Genus: Erica
- Species: E. tristis

Binomial name
- Erica tristis Bartl.

Synonyms
- Erica absinthoides Thunb.; Erica cupressifolia J.C.Wendl. ex Klotzsch; Ericoides triste (Bartl.) Kuntze; Philippia absinthoides E.G.H.Oliv.; Philippia chamissonis Klotzsch; Salaxis chamissonis D.Dietr.

= Erica tristis =

Species of flowering plant

Erica tristis, the Cape tree heath, is a small tree, sometimes a shrub, belonging to genus Erica. It is found in fynbos and rocky places in the Western Cape.
