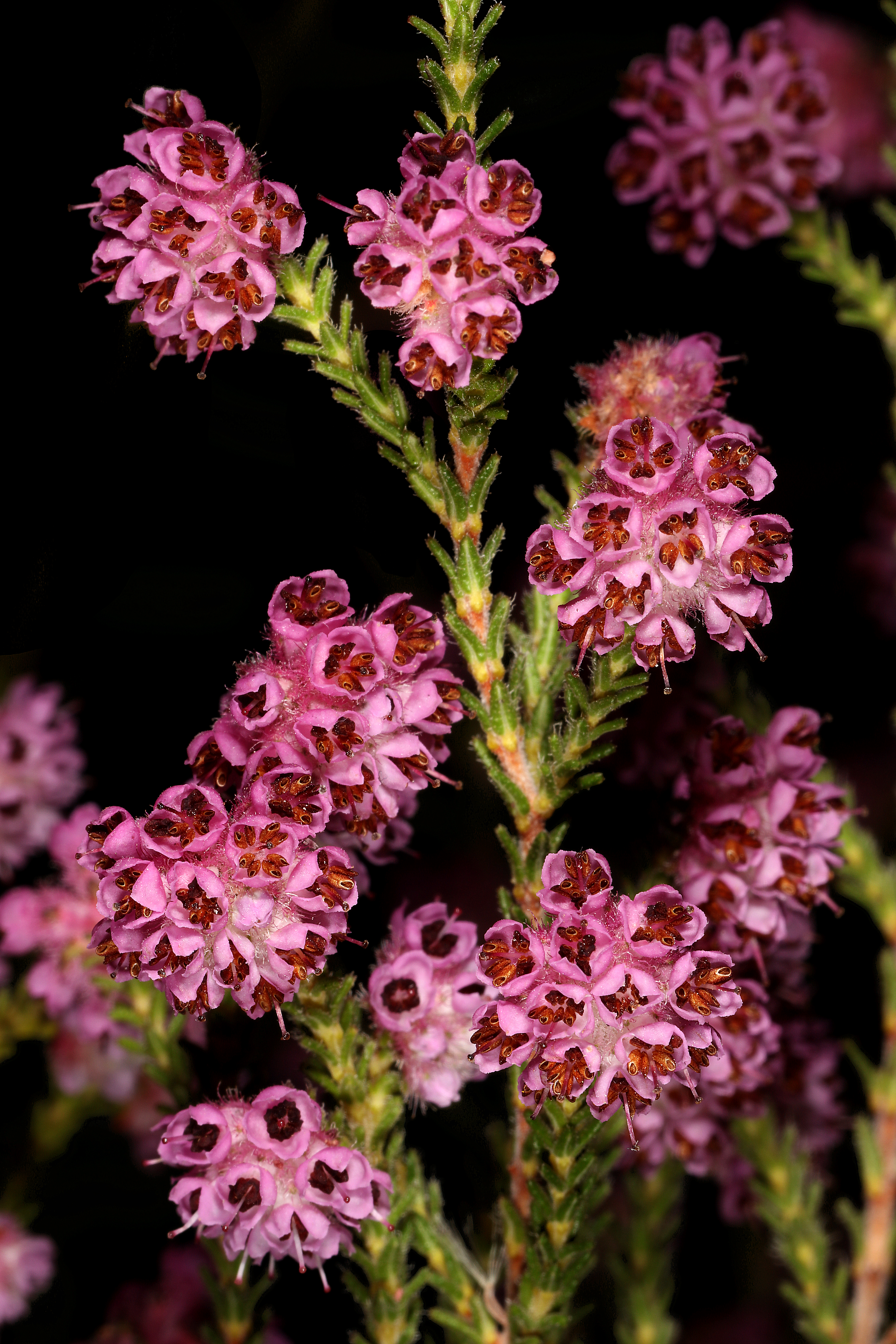

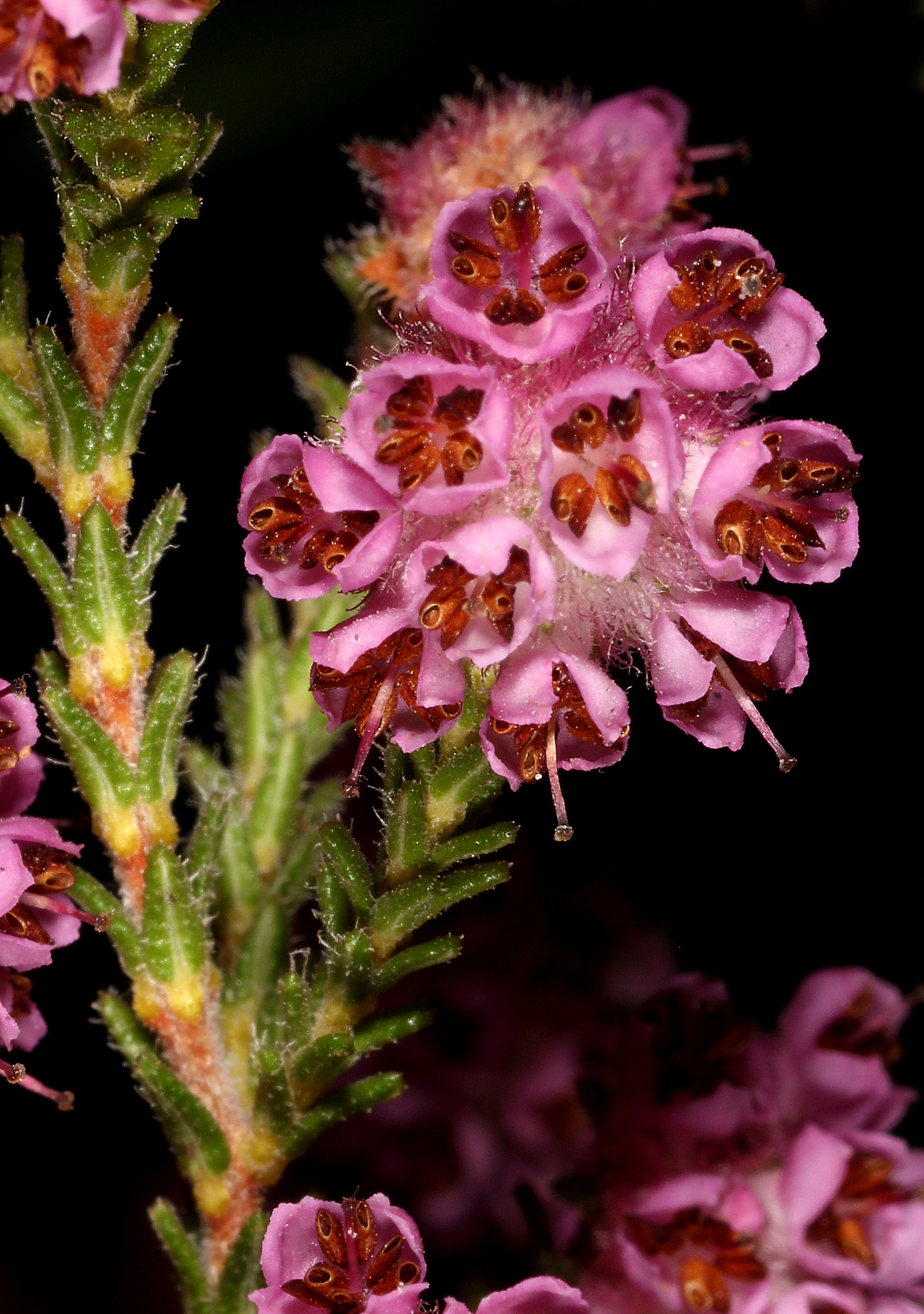

Scientific classification
- Kingdom: Plantae
- Clade: Tracheophytes
- Clade: Angiosperms
- Clade: Eudicots
- Clade: Asterids
- Order: Ericales
- Family: Ericaceae
- Genus: Erica
- Species: E. plumosa

Binomial name
- Erica plumosa Thunb.

Synonyms
- Blaeria ciliaris L.f.; Blaeria ciliciiflora G.Don; Blaeria incana Bartl.; Blaeria nodiflora G.Don; Blaeria ptilota E.Mey. ex Benth.; Erica ciliciiflora Salisb.; Erica hirsuta Salisb.; Erica scholliana G.Lodd.; Ericoides plumosum (Thunb.) Kuntze; Grisebachia alba N.E.Br.; Grisebachia apiculata N.E.Br.; Grisebachia bolusii N.E.Br.; Grisebachia ciliaris (L.f.) Klotzsch; Grisebachia ciliaris subsp. bolusii (N.E.Br.) E.G.H.Oliv.; Grisebachia ciliaris subsp. ciliciiflora (Salisb.) E.G.H.Oliv.; Grisebachia ciliaris subsp. involuta (Klotzsch) E.G.H.Oliv.; Grisebachia ciliaris subsp. multiglandulosa E.G.H.Oliv.; Grisebachia ciliciiflora (Salisb.) Druce; Grisebachia dregeana Benth.; Grisebachia hirta Klotzsch; Grisebachia hispida Klotzsch; Grisebachia incana (Bartl.) Klotzsch; Grisebachia involuta Klotzsch; Grisebachia nivenii N.E.Br.; Grisebachia pentheri Zahlbr.; Grisebachia pilifolia N.E.Br.; Grisebachia plumosa (Thunb.) Klotzsch; Grisebachia plumosa subsp. eciliata E.G.H.Oliv.; Grisebachia plumosa subsp. hirta (Klotzsch) E.G.H.Oliv.; Grisebachia plumosa subsp. hispida (Klotzsch) E.G.H.Oliv.; Grisebachia plumosa subsp. irrorata E.G.H.Oliv.; Grisebachia plumosa subsp. pentheri (Zahlbr.) E.G.H.Oliv.; Grisebachia rigida N.E.Br.; Grisebachia serrulata Benth.; Grisebachia solivaga N.E.Br.; Grisebachia thunbergii Rach; Grisebachia velleriflora Klotzsch; Grisebachia zeyheriana Klotzsch; Pilopus nodiflora Raf.

= Erica plumosa =

Species of flowering plant

Erica plumosa is a plant belonging to the genus Erica and is part of the fynbos. The species is endemic to the Northern Cape and Western Cape.
