= Erica oliveri =

Scientific classification
- Kingdom: Plantae
- Clade: Tracheophytes
- Clade: Angiosperms
- Clade: Eudicots
- Clade: Asterids
- Order: Ericales
- Family: Ericaceae
- Genus: Erica
- Species: E. oliveri

Binomial name
- Erica oliveri H.A.Baker

Species of flowering plant

Erica oliveri is a plant that belongs to the genus Erica and is part of the fynbos. The species is endemic to the Western Cape. The plant is named after the botanist Edward George Hudson Oliver.
