= Erica benguelensis =

Conservation status
- Least Concern (IUCN 3.1)

Scientific classification
- Kingdom: Plantae
- Clade: Tracheophytes
- Clade: Angiosperms
- Clade: Eudicots
- Clade: Asterids
- Order: Ericales
- Family: Ericaceae
- Genus: Erica
- Species: E. benguelensis

Binomial name
- Erica benguelensis (Welw. ex Engl.) E.G.H.Oliv., (1992)

Synonyms
- Erica benguelensis var. albescens (R.Ross) E.G.H.Oliv.; Philippia benguelensis (Welw. ex Engl.) Britten; Philippia benguelensis var. albescens R.Ross; Philippia congoensis S.Moore; Philippia holstii Engl.; Philippia kundelungensis S.Moore; Philippia milanjiensis Britten & Rendle; Philippia stuhlmannii Engl.; Salaxis benguelensis Welw. ex Engl.

Species of flowering plant

Erica benguelensis is a plant belonging to the genus Erica. The species is native to Angola, Burundi, Democratic Republic of the Congo, Malawi, Mozambique, Rwanda, Tanzania, Uganda, Zambia and Zimbabwe.
