= Erica muscosa =

Scientific classification
- Kingdom: Plantae
- Clade: Tracheophytes
- Clade: Angiosperms
- Clade: Eudicots
- Clade: Asterids
- Order: Ericales
- Family: Ericaceae
- Genus: Erica
- Species: E. muscosa

Binomial name
- Erica muscosa (Aiton) E.G.H.Oliv.

Synonyms
- Blaeria muscosa Aiton; Erica albens Thunb.; Omphalocaryon muscosum Klotzsch; Scyphogyne muscosa (Aiton) Druce; Scyphogyne schlechteri N.E.Br.

Species of flowering plant

Erica muscosa, the stickyleaf heath, is a plant belonging to the genus Erica and is part of the fynbos. The species is endemic to the Northern Cape and Western Cape.
