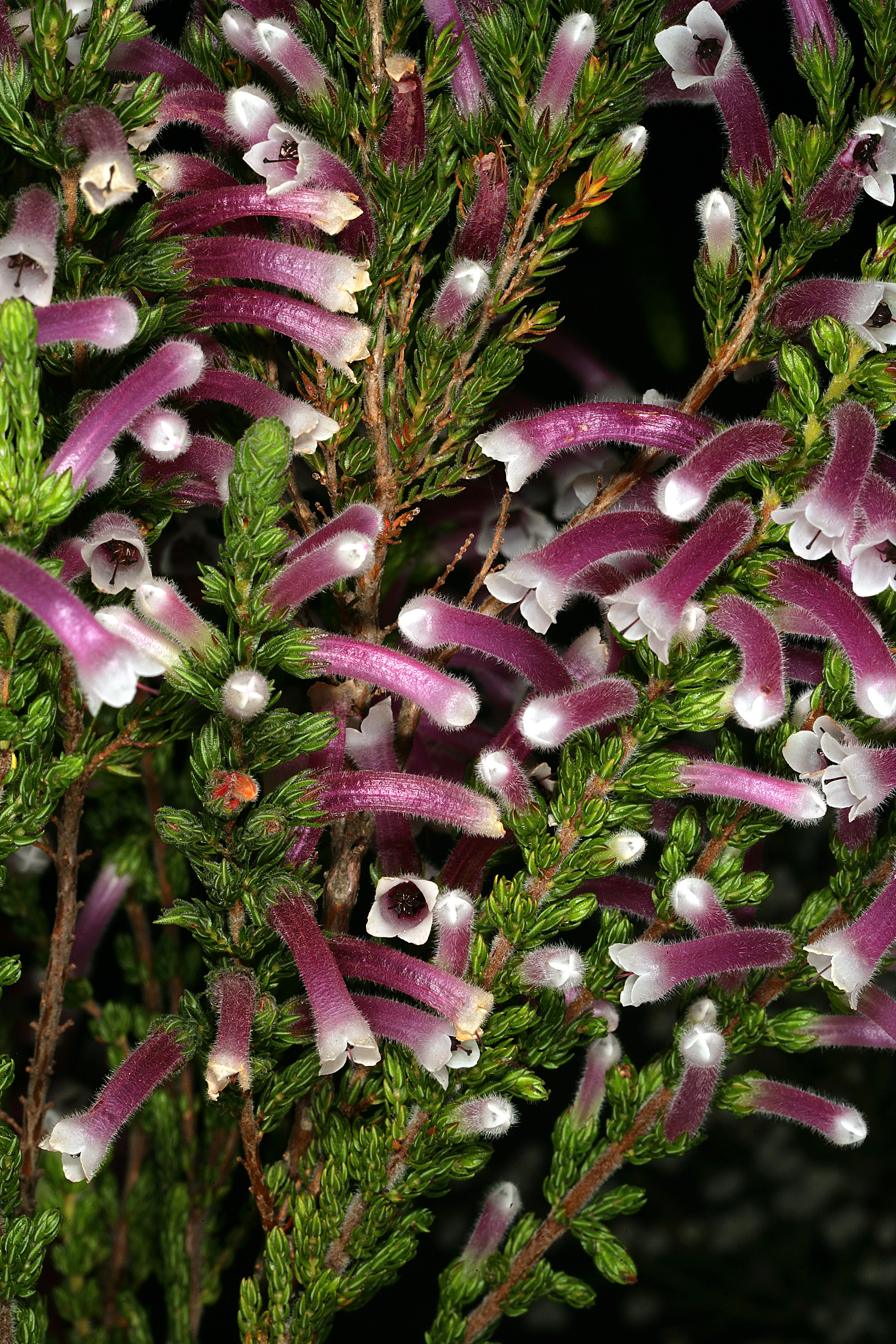

Scientific classification
- Kingdom: Plantae
- Clade: Tracheophytes
- Clade: Angiosperms
- Clade: Eudicots
- Clade: Asterids
- Order: Ericales
- Family: Ericaceae
- Genus: Erica
- Species: E. macowanii

Binomial name
- Erica macowanii Cufino

= Erica macowanii =

Species of flowering plant

Erica macowanii, the Cape Muslim heath and slamseheide in Afrikaans, is a plant belonging to the genus Erica and is part of the fynbos. The species is endemic to the Western Cape.

The plant has a subspecies: Erica macowanii subsp. lanceolata (Bolus) E.G.H.Oliv. & I.M.Oliv.
