= Erica vernicosa =

Scientific classification
- Kingdom: Plantae
- Clade: Tracheophytes
- Clade: Angiosperms
- Clade: Eudicots
- Clade: Asterids
- Order: Ericales
- Family: Ericaceae
- Genus: Erica
- Species: E. vernicosa

Binomial name
- Erica vernicosa E.G.H.Oliv.

Species of flowering plant

Erica vernicosa, the varnished heath, is a plant belonging to the genus Erica. The species is endemic to the Western Cape.
