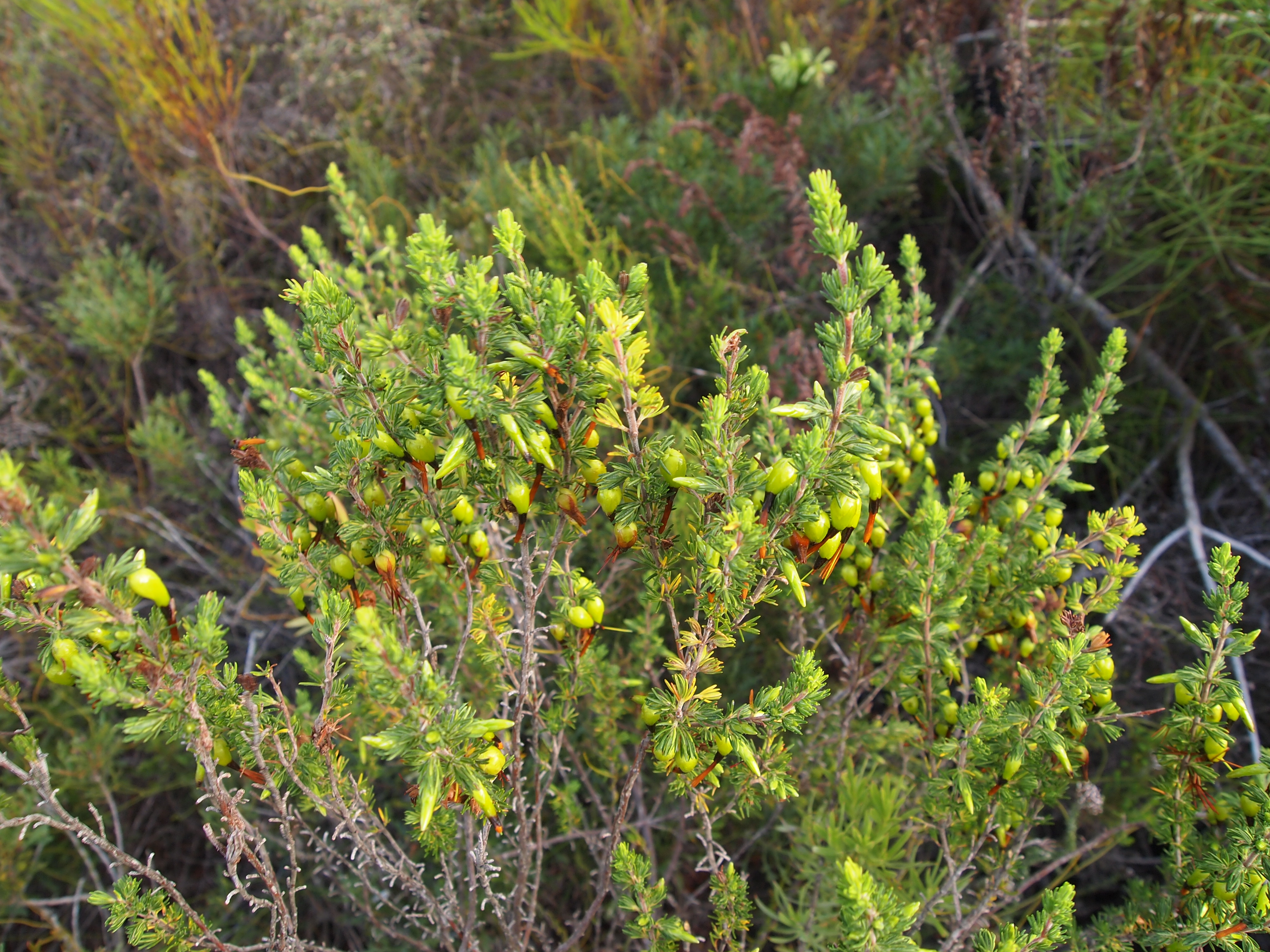

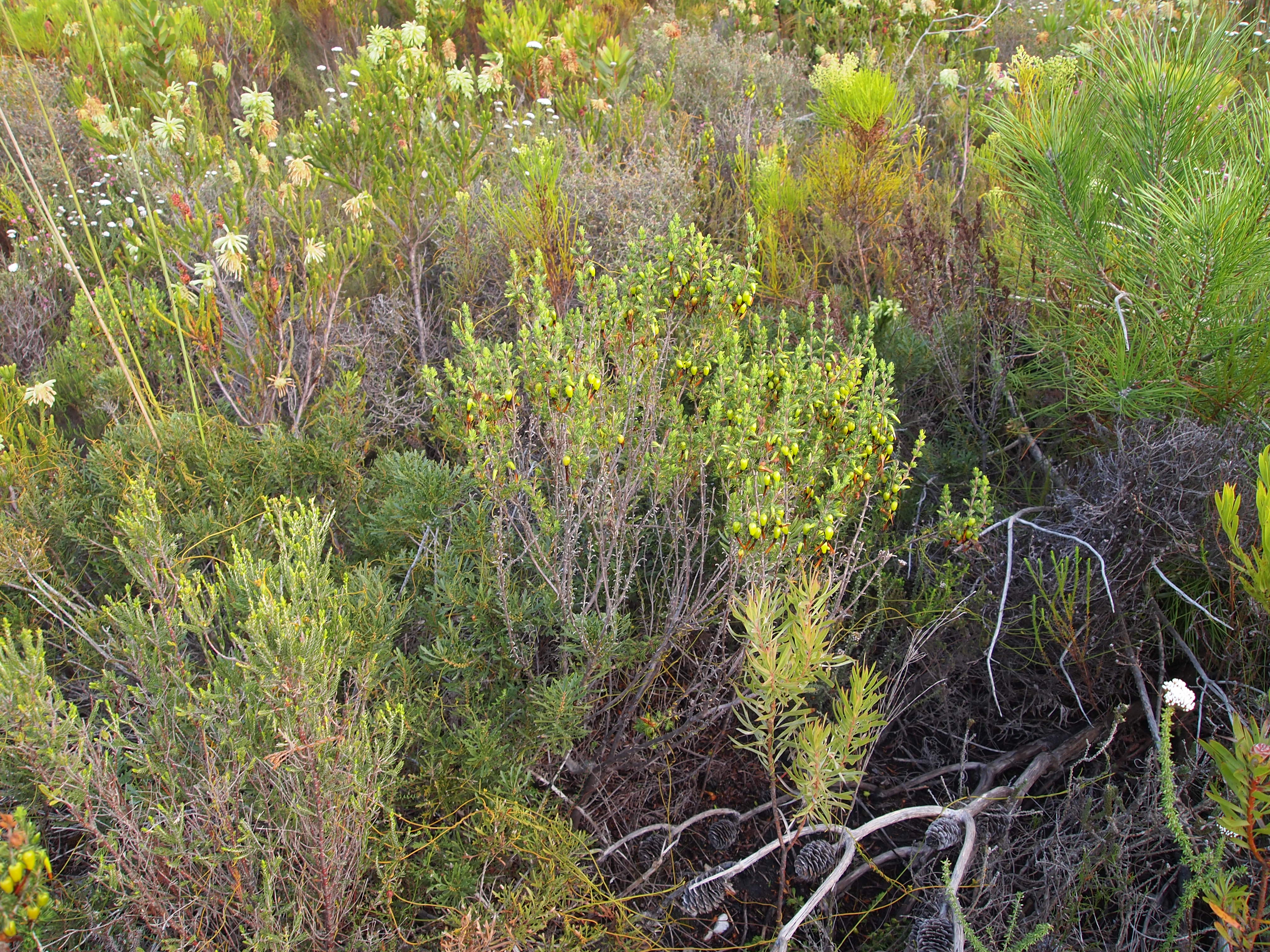

Scientific classification
- Kingdom: Plantae
- Clade: Tracheophytes
- Clade: Angiosperms
- Clade: Eudicots
- Clade: Asterids
- Order: Ericales
- Family: Ericaceae
- Genus: Erica
- Species: E. melastoma

Binomial name
- Erica melastoma Andrews

Synonyms
- Ectasis picta G.Don; Ectasis vestiflua (Salisb.) G.Don; Erica follicularis Salisb.; Erica picta J.Forbes; Erica vestiflua Salisb.; Ericoides vestifluum Salisb.) Kuntze

= Erica melastoma =

Species of flowering plant

Erica melastoma is a plant belonging to the genus Erica and is part of the fynbos. The species is endemic to the Western Cape.

The plant also has one subspecies: Erica melastoma subsp. minor E.G.H.Oliv. & I.M.Oliv.
