= Erica cymosa =

Scientific classification
- Kingdom: Plantae
- Clade: Tracheophytes
- Clade: Angiosperms
- Clade: Eudicots
- Clade: Asterids
- Order: Ericales
- Family: Ericaceae
- Genus: Erica
- Species: E. cymosa

Binomial name
- Erica cymosa E.Mey. ex Benth.

Species of flowering plant

Erica cymosa is a plant belonging to the genus Erica and forming part of the fynbos. The species is endemic to the Western Cape and occurs from Wellington to Franschhoek where there are nine subpopulations. The plant is considered rare.

The plant has a subspecies: Erica cymosa subsp. grandiflora E.G.H.Oliv. & I.M.Oliv.
