= Erica abbottii =

Scientific classification
- Kingdom: Plantae
- Clade: Tracheophytes
- Clade: Angiosperms
- Clade: Eudicots
- Clade: Asterids
- Order: Ericales
- Family: Ericaceae
- Genus: Erica
- Species: E. abbottii

Binomial name
- Erica abbottii E.G.H. Oliv.

Species of flowering plant

Erica abbottii is a species of erica that is endemic to the coastal areas of southern KwaZulu-Natal and the northern Eastern Cape, South Africa. It is one of only six Erica species to occur in this area.
