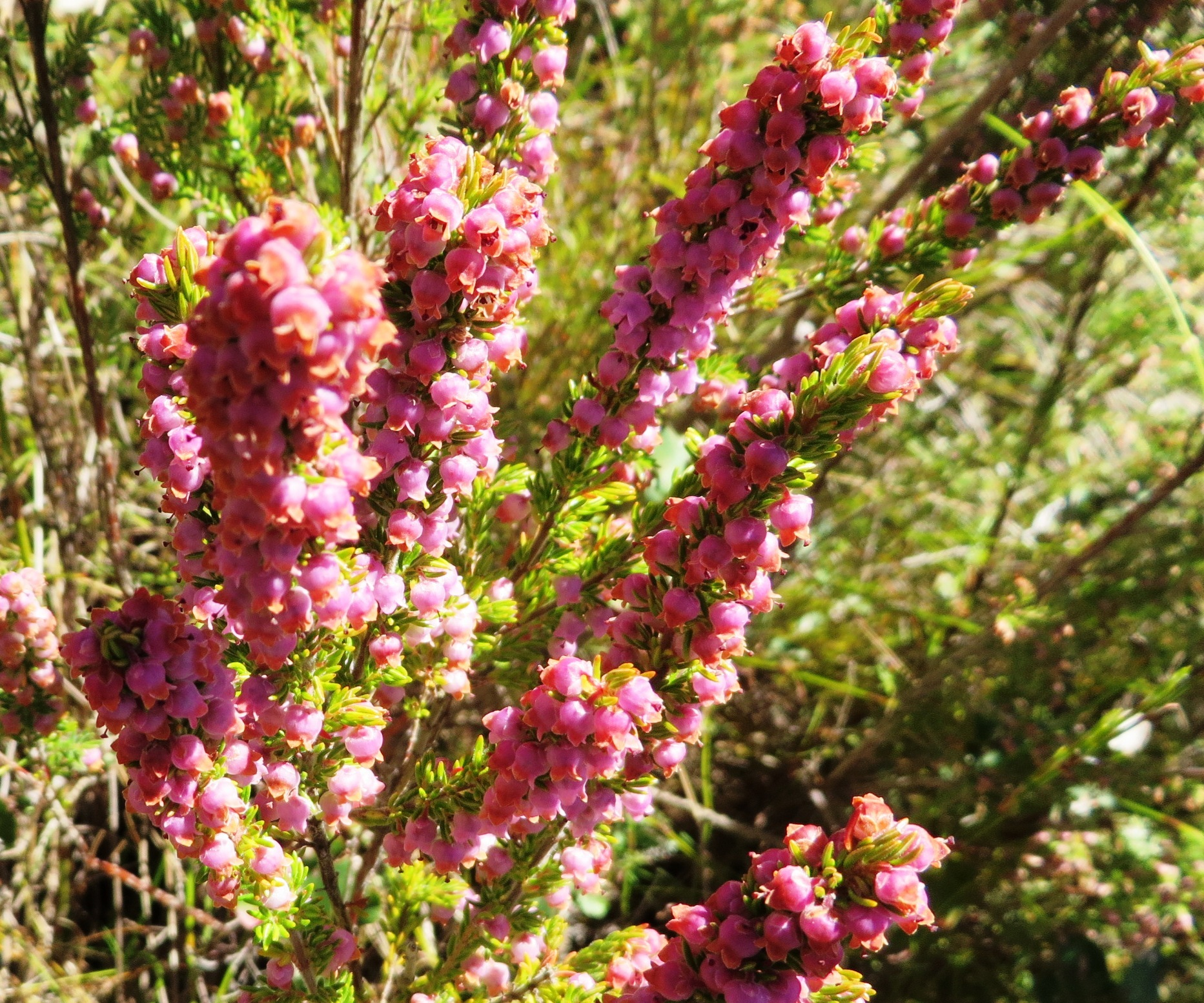

Scientific classification
- Kingdom: Plantae
- Clade: Tracheophytes
- Clade: Angiosperms
- Clade: Eudicots
- Clade: Asterids
- Order: Ericales
- Family: Ericaceae
- Genus: Erica
- Species: E. hottentotica

Binomial name
- Erica hottentotica E.G.H.Oliv.

= Erica hottentotica =

Species of flowering plant

Erica hottentotica is a plant belonging to the genus Erica and forming part of the fynbos. The species is endemic to the Western Cape and occurs in the Hottentots Holland Mountains at Landdroskop and Somerset Sneeukop. The plant's range is smaller than 100 km^{2}, is considered rare and the habitat is not threatened. It occurs on the moist, south-facing slopes.
