= Erica stagnalis =

Scientific classification
- Kingdom: Plantae
- Clade: Tracheophytes
- Clade: Angiosperms
- Clade: Eudicots
- Clade: Asterids
- Order: Ericales
- Family: Ericaceae
- Genus: Erica
- Species: E. stagnalis

Binomial name
- Erica stagnalis Salisb.

Synonyms
- Erica sulphurea Andrews; Syringodea stagnalis G.Don; Syringodea sulphurea (Andrews) G.Don

Species of flowering plant

Erica stagnalis, the swamp heath, is a plant belonging to the genus Erica. The species is endemic to the Western Cape.

The plant has a subspecies: Erica stagnalis subsp. minor E.G.H.Oliv. & I.M. Oliv.
