= Erica lecomtei =

Conservation status
- Endangered (IUCN 3.1)

Scientific classification
- Kingdom: Plantae
- Clade: Tracheophytes
- Clade: Angiosperms
- Clade: Eudicots
- Clade: Asterids
- Order: Ericales
- Family: Ericaceae
- Genus: Erica
- Species: E. lecomtei

Binomial name
- Erica lecomtei (H.Perrier) Dorr & E.G.H.Oliv.

Synonyms
- Philippia lecomtei H.Perrier

Species of flowering plant

Erica lecomtei is a plant belonging to the genus Erica. The plant is endemic to Madagascar.

The plant also has two subspecies:

- Erica lecomtei subsp. lecomtei
- Erica lecomtei subsp. ravinakely Dorr
