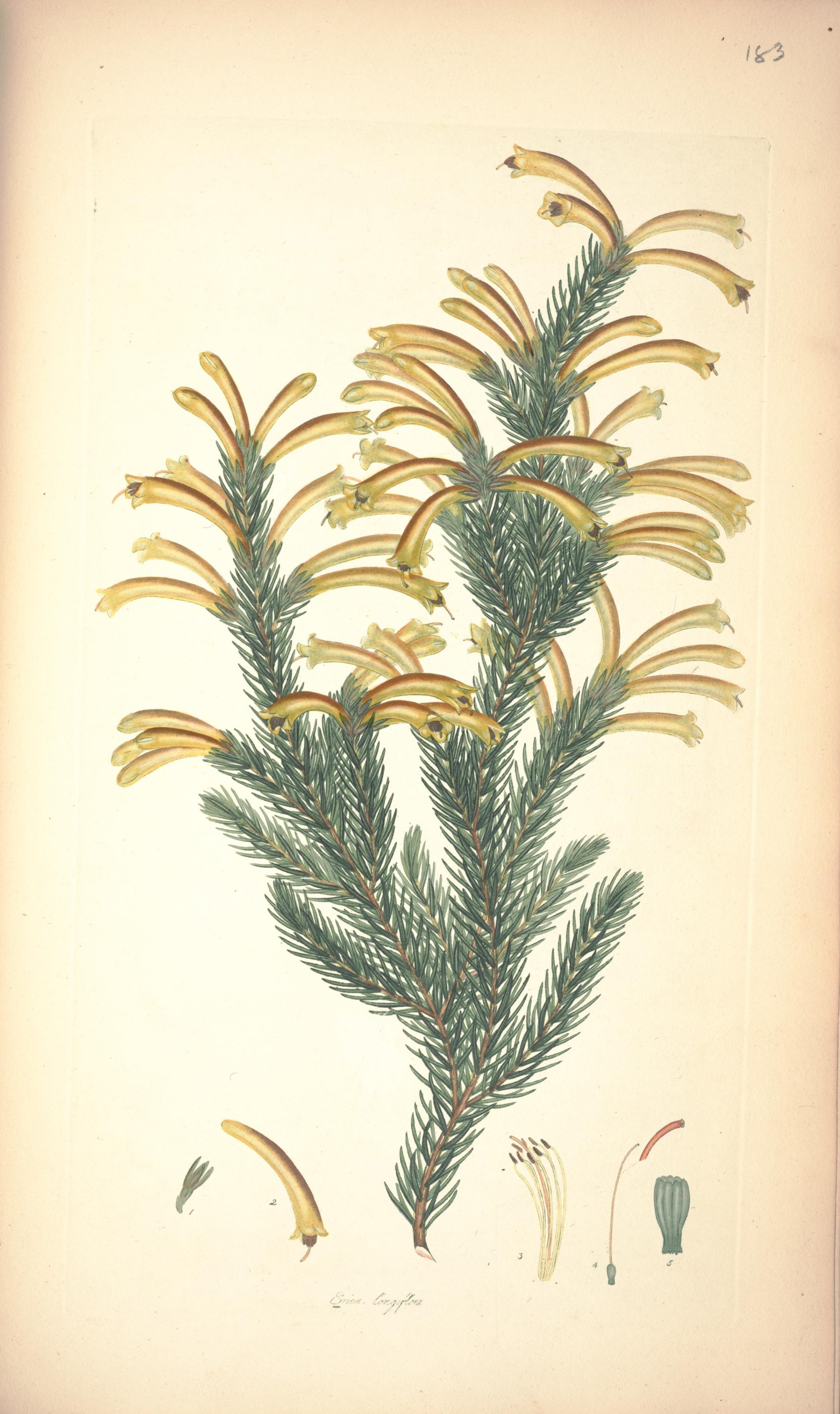

Scientific classification
- Kingdom: Plantae
- Clade: Tracheophytes
- Clade: Angiosperms
- Clade: Eudicots
- Clade: Asterids
- Order: Ericales
- Family: Ericaceae
- Genus: Erica
- Species: E. conspicua

Binomial name
- Erica conspicua Aiton

Synonyms
- Ericoides conspicuum (Aiton) Kuntze; Syringodea conspicua (Aiton) G.Don

= Erica conspicua =

Species of flowering plant

Erica conspicua is a plant belonging to the genus Erica and forming part of the fynbos. The species is endemic to the Western Cape.

The plant has a subspecies: Erica conspicua subsp. roseoflora E.G.H.Oliv. & I.M.Oliv.
