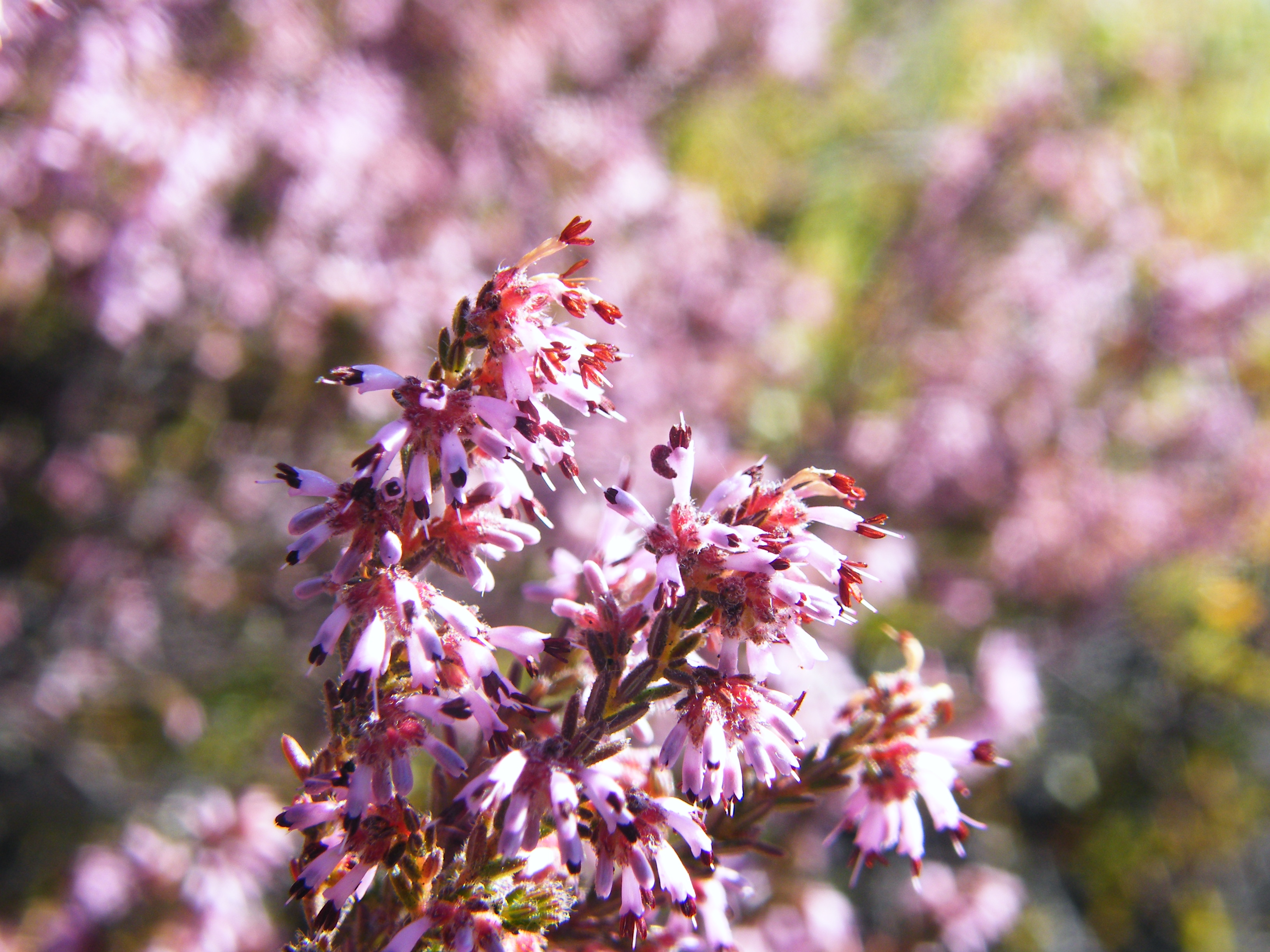

Scientific classification
- Kingdom: Plantae
- Clade: Tracheophytes
- Clade: Angiosperms
- Clade: Eudicots
- Clade: Asterids
- Order: Ericales
- Family: Ericaceae
- Genus: Erica
- Species: E. similis

Binomial name
- Erica similis (N.E.Br.) E.G.H.Oliv.

Synonyms
- Blaeria articulata Willd. ex Steud.; Blaeria articulata L.; Blaeria bracteata J.C.Wendl.; Blaeria eriantha Willd. ex Steud.; Erica articulata (L.) Thunb.; Erica paleacea Salisb.; Simocheilus articulatus (L.) Druce; Sympieza articulata (L.) N.E.Br.; Syndesmanthus articulatus (L.) Klotzsch; Syndesmanthus elimensis N.E.Br.; Syndesmanthus glaucus Klotzsch; Syndesmanthus scaber Klotzsch; Syndesmanthus similis N.E.Br.; Thoracosperma articulata Kuntze; Thoracosperma glauca Kuntze; Thoracosperma scabra Kuntze

= Erica similis =

Species of flowering plant

Erica similis is a plant belonging to the genus Erica and is part of the fynbos. The species is endemic to the Western Cape.
