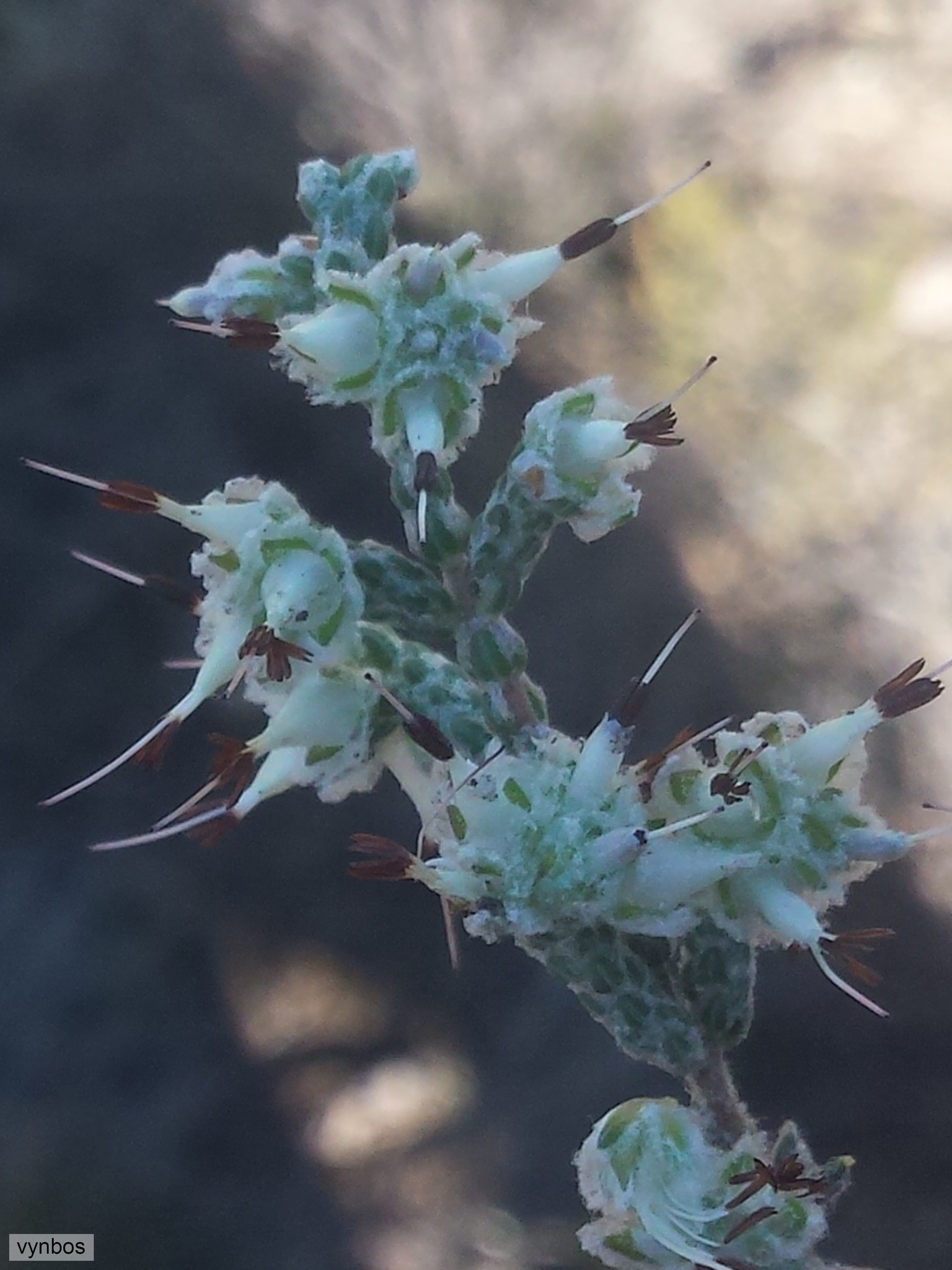

Scientific classification
- Kingdom: Plantae
- Clade: Tracheophytes
- Clade: Angiosperms
- Clade: Eudicots
- Clade: Asterids
- Order: Ericales
- Family: Ericaceae
- Genus: Erica
- Species: E. xeranthemifolia

Binomial name
- Erica xeranthemifolia Salisb.

Synonyms
- Acrostemon xeranthemifolius (Salisb.) E.G.H.Oliv.; Blaeria xeranthemifolia (Salisb.) G.Don; Eremia lanata (Klotzsch) Benth.; Eremia xeranthemifolia (Salisb.) Druce; Hexastemon lanatus Klotzsch; Hexastemon xeranthemifolius (Salisb.) Druce

= Erica xeranthemifolia =

Species of flowering plant

Erica xeranthemifolia, the woolfringe heath, is a plant belonging to the genus Erica and is part of the fynbos. The species is endemic to the Western Cape and occurs at the Steenboksberg, Shaw's Pass, Shaw's Mountain and the Babilonstoring Mountains. The subpopulations at lower altitudes have been lost due to agricultural and forestry activities. There is currently only one subpopulation remaining in an area of 3 km². These plants are threatened by invasive plants, grazing by livestock and the establishment of grain fields and vineyards.
