= Erica swaziensis =

Conservation status
- Vulnerable (IUCN 3.1)

Scientific classification
- Kingdom: Plantae
- Clade: Tracheophytes
- Clade: Angiosperms
- Clade: Eudicots
- Clade: Asterids
- Order: Ericales
- Family: Ericaceae
- Genus: Erica
- Species: E. swaziensis

Binomial name
- Erica swaziensis E.G.H.Oliv., (1991)

Species of flowering plant

Erica swaziensis is a plant belonging to the genus Erica. The species is endemic to Eswatini.
