= Erica globiceps =

Scientific classification
- Kingdom: Plantae
- Clade: Tracheophytes
- Clade: Angiosperms
- Clade: Eudicots
- Clade: Asterids
- Order: Ericales
- Family: Ericaceae
- Genus: Erica
- Species: E. globiceps

Binomial name
- Erica globiceps (N.E.Br.) E.G.H.Oliv.

Synonyms
- Syndesmanthus globiceps N.E.Br.; Syndesmanthus sympiezoides N.E.Br.; Syndesmanthus zeyheri Bolus ex N.E.Br.

Species of flowering plant

Erica globiceps is a plant belonging to the genus Erica and forming part of the fynbos. The species' scientific name was first published by E.G.H. Oliver. The species is endemic to the Western Cape.

The plant has two subspecies:

- Erica globiceps subsp. consors (N.E.Br.) E.G.H.Oliv.
- Erica globiceps subsp. gracilis (Benth.) E.G.H.Oliv.
