= Erica croceovirens =

Scientific classification
- Kingdom: Plantae
- Clade: Tracheophytes
- Clade: Angiosperms
- Clade: Eudicots
- Clade: Asterids
- Order: Ericales
- Family: Ericaceae
- Genus: Erica
- Species: E. croceovirens

Binomial name
- Erica croceovirens E.G.H.Oliv. & I.M.Oliv.

Species of flowering plant

Erica croceovirens, the Doringrivier heath and saffron-&-green heath, is a plant belonging to the genus Erica and forming part of the fynbos. The species is endemic to the Western Cape and occurs in one location, at the Doringrivier Wilderness Area on the northern slopes of the Outeniqua Mountains. Its range is only 10 km^{2}, the plant is considered critically rare. However, the habitat is not threatened.
