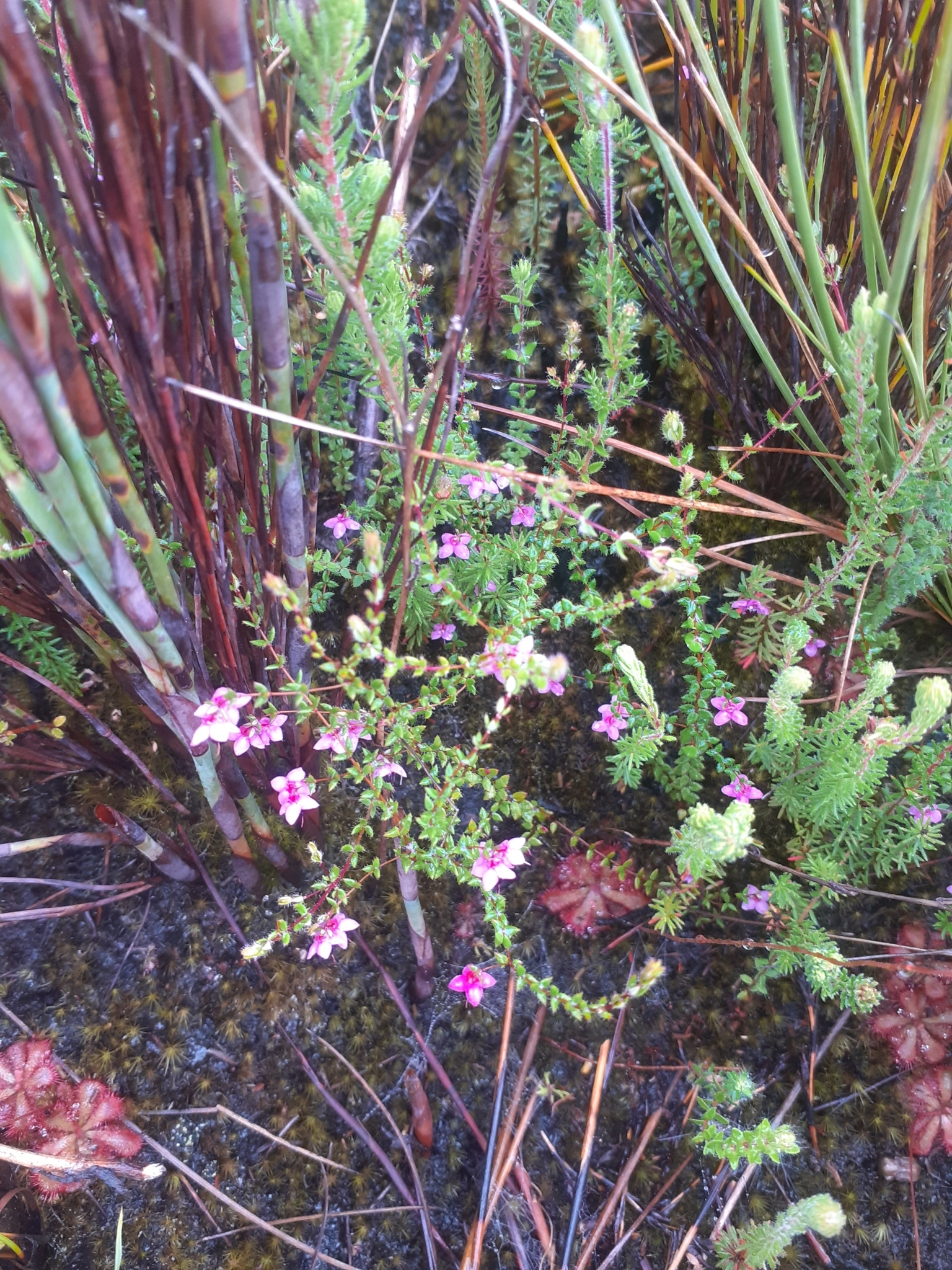

Scientific classification
- Kingdom: Plantae
- Clade: Tracheophytes
- Clade: Angiosperms
- Clade: Eudicots
- Clade: Asterids
- Order: Ericales
- Family: Ericaceae
- Genus: Erica
- Species: E. amicorum

Binomial name
- Erica amicorum E.G.H.Oliv.

= Erica amicorum =

Species of flowering plant

Erica amicorum is a plant that belongs to the genus Erica and forms part of the fynbos. The species is endemic to the Western Cape where it occurs in the Langeberg at heights of 300 to 600 meters in wet areas. The plant is rare.
