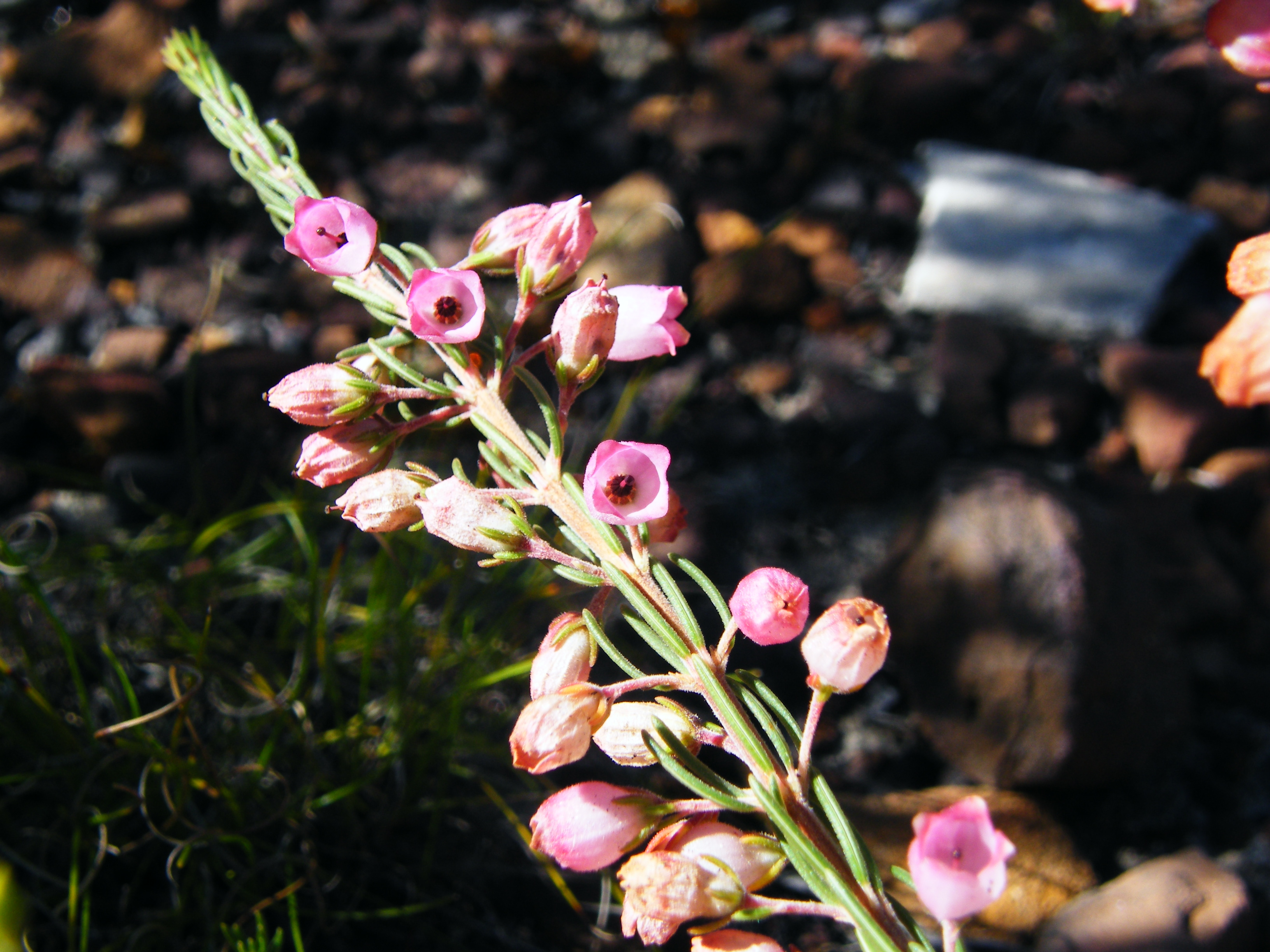

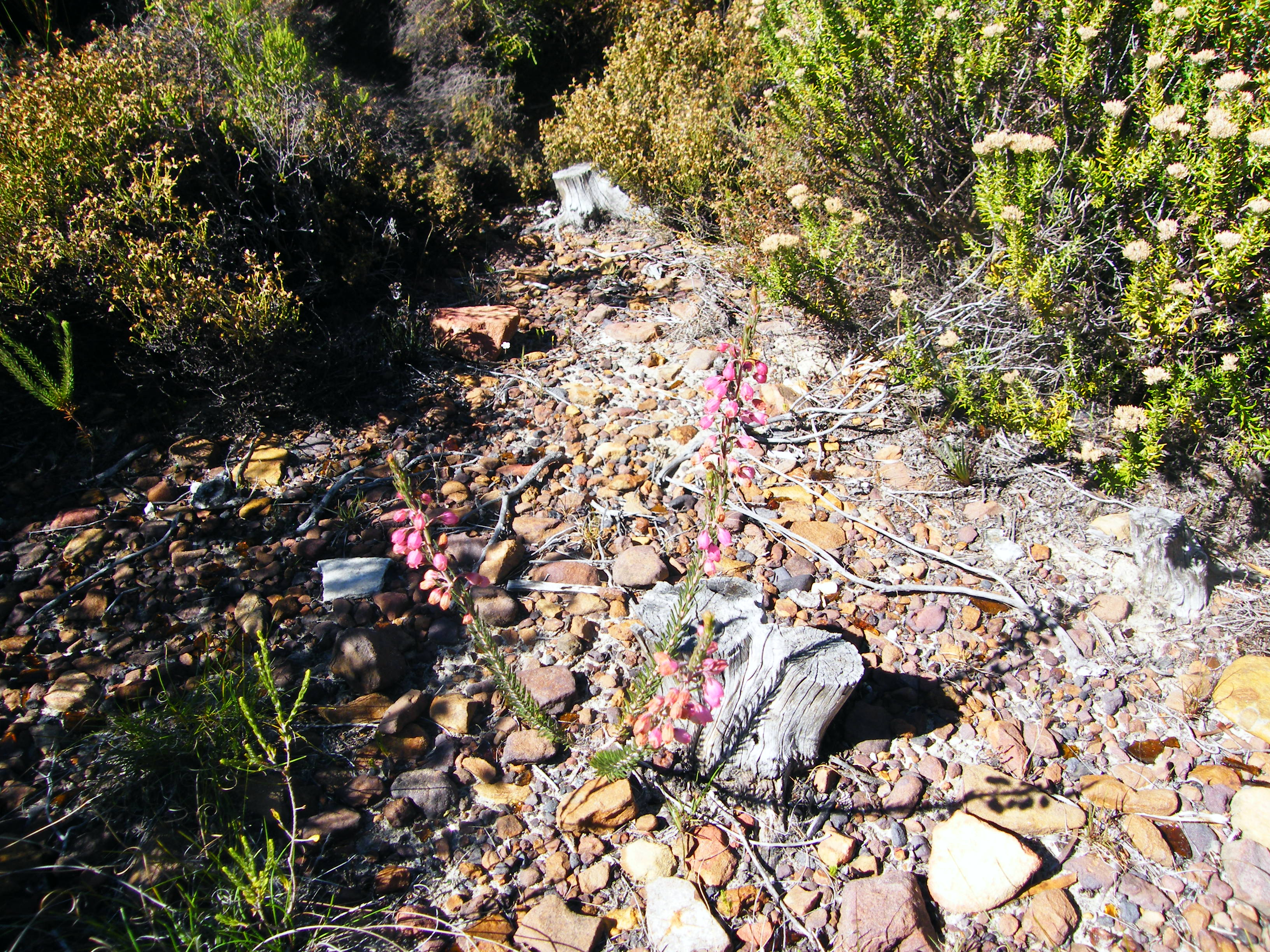

Scientific classification
- Kingdom: Plantae
- Clade: Tracheophytes
- Clade: Angiosperms
- Clade: Eudicots
- Clade: Asterids
- Order: Ericales
- Family: Ericaceae
- Genus: Erica
- Species: E. viscaria

Binomial name
- Erica viscaria L. (1770)

Synonyms
- Erica cubitalis L.; Erica decora Andrews; Erica secundiflora Tausch; Erica viscida Salisb.; Ericoides decorum Kuntze; Ericoides viscarium (L.) Kuntze

= Erica viscaria =

Species of flowering plant

Erica viscaria is a plant belonging to the genus Erica. The species is endemic to the Western Cape, a province of South Africa.
