= Edward George Hudson Oliver =

South African botanist

- Born: October 14, 1938; Rondebosch, South Africa
- Died: January 20, 2025 (aged 86)
- Education: University of Cape Town
- Known for: expert in genus Erica in the family Ericaceae recognized world authority on the subfamily Ericoideae

Edward (Ted) George Hudson Oliver, (1938-2025) was a South African Botanist and author. He is an expert in heathers. He has discovered and named several species. Oliver is the recognized world authority on the subfamily Ericoideae.

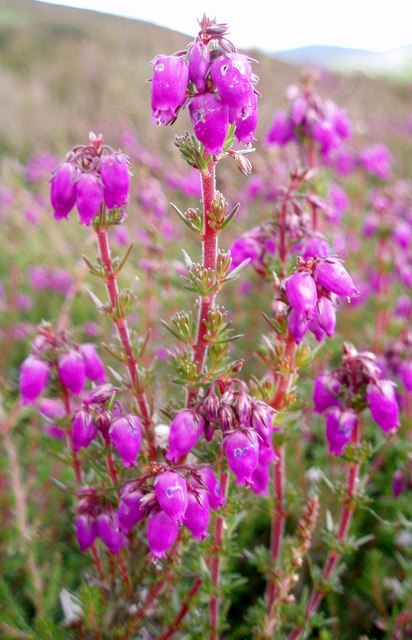
Erica cinerea

== Life and career ==
Oliver was born 14 October 1938 in Rondebosch. He was educated at Bishops College from 1947 to 1957. He obtained an MSc and PhD (in Botany) from the University of Cape Town.

From 1946 to 1966 he was appointed Curator of the Government Herbarium in Stellenbosch. He was the South African Liaison Botanist at the Royal Botanic Gardens at Kew in London from 1967 to 1969.

He returned to South Africa in 1970 and worked as a Research Taxonomist in Stellenbosch until 1976 when he moved to Pretoria to take up the position of Curator of the National Herbarium until 1982.

He returned to Stellenbosch in 1982 and again took up the position of Research Taxonomist. From 1984 to 1996 he was again appointed Curator of the Government Herbarium in Stellenbosch. He then moved to Kirstenbosch and was appointed the Research taxonomist at the Compton Herbarium of the National Botanical Institute at Kirstenbosch, a position he held until 2006.

== Awards and accolades ==
- President of the National Botanical Society of South Africa, retired 2013
- Honorary Life Member of the National Botanical Society of South Africa
- Honorary Membership of the British Heather Society
- Molteno Gold Medal 2009 (Cape Tercentenary Foundation) for his Ericaceae research

== Personal life ==
Oliver was married to Inge M. Oliver (née Nitzsche), who died in 2003. They have a son and two daughters. Oliver enjoys gardening, hiking and classical music. His favourite quote is "Ex Africa semper aliquid novi" - Out of Africa always something new.

== Selected works ==
Oliver published more than 100 papers in various botanical journals. Three of his contributions are:

- Hunting for Ericas in Madagascar, yearbook of The Heather Society, vol 8 (2011)
- Ericas in Mauritius, home of the dodo, yearbook of The Heather Society, vol 11 (2014)
- Looking for Spanish heathers, yearbook of The Heather Society, vol 12 (2015)

Three of the books that he co-authored are:

- Ericas in Southern Africa, H. A. Baker, F. Anderson, I. von Below, E. G. H. Oliver (1967, 1992)
- Ericas of South Africa, D. Schumann, G. Kirsten, E. G. H. Oliver (1992)
- Field guide to the Ericas of the Cape Peninsula, E. G. H. Oliver, I. M. Oliver (2000)

== Legacy ==
Erica oliveri is named after him and was first identified in 1961.

Three of the species described by him are:

- Erica ignita
- Erica roseoloba
- Erica saptouensis
