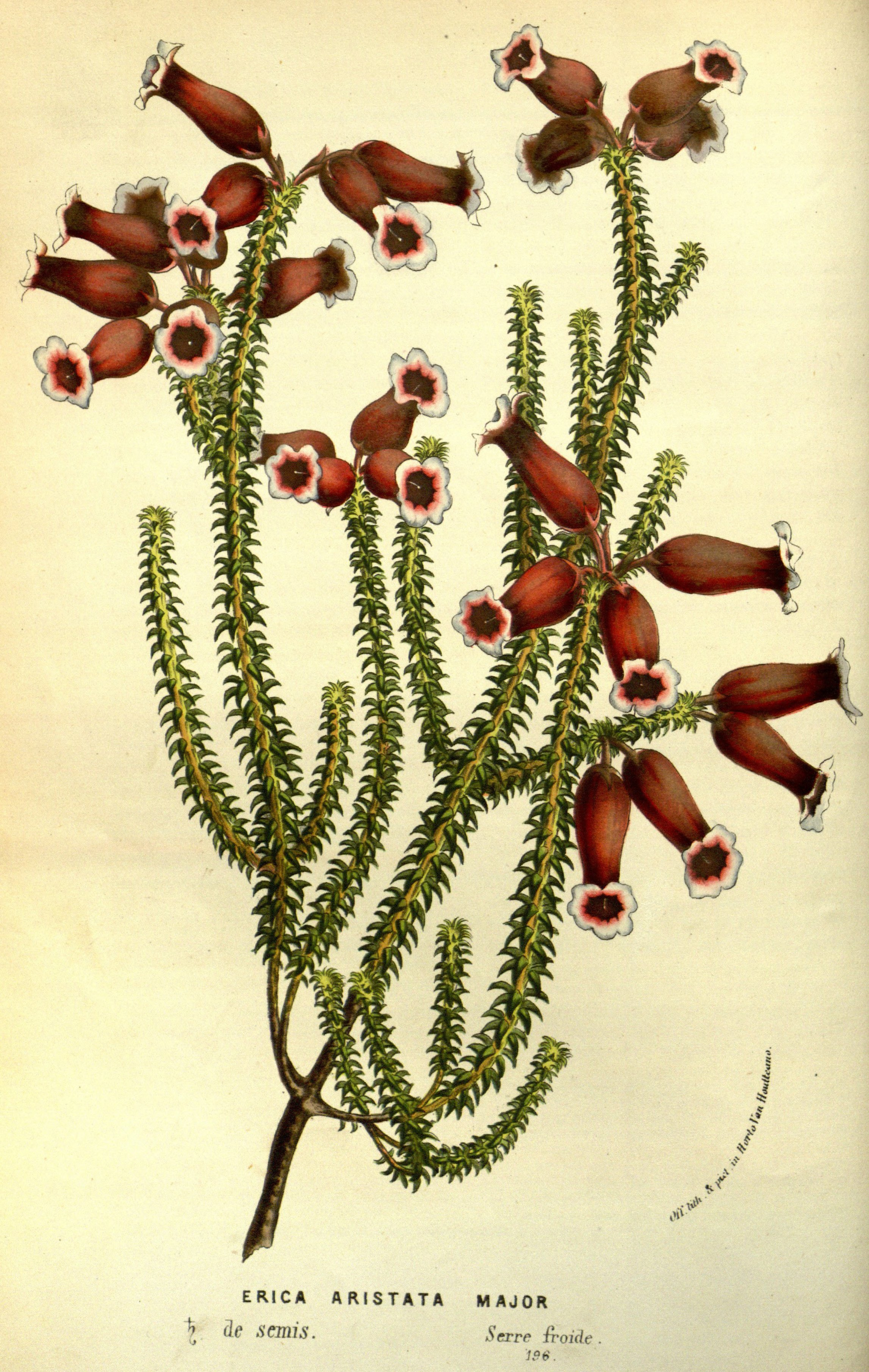

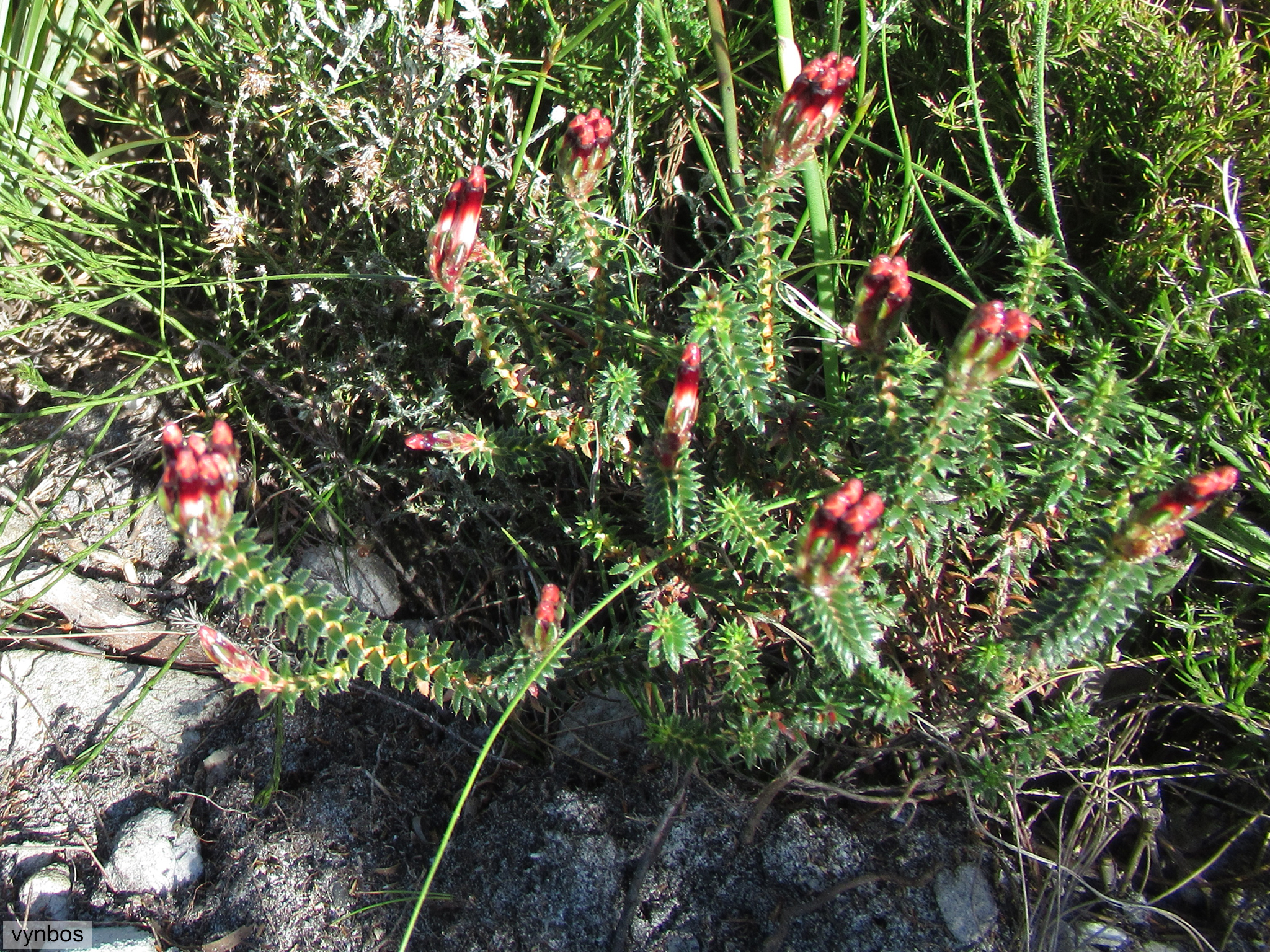

Scientific classification
- Kingdom: Plantae
- Clade: Tracheophytes
- Clade: Angiosperms
- Clade: Eudicots
- Clade: Asterids
- Order: Ericales
- Family: Ericaceae
- Genus: Erica
- Species: E. aristata

Binomial name
- Erica aristata Andrews

Synonyms
- Erica clowieana Benth.; Erica coruscans L.Bolus; Erica ducalis Klotzsch; Erica forbesiana Klotzsch; Erica hartnellii Klotzsch; Erica lycopodioides Lodd. ex Benth.; Erica pinguis Klotzsch; Erica sprengelii Endl.; Ericoides aristatum (Andrews) Kuntze; Ericoides lycopodiodes Kuntze; Euryloma ampullaceoides G.Don; Euryloma aristata G.Don; Euryloma crinita (G.Lodd. ex J.Forbes) G.Don; Euryloma hartnelli G.Don; Euryloma tricolor G.Don

= Erica aristata =

Species of flowering plant

Erica aristata, commonly known as the "Pride of Hermanus" or tower heath, is a plant belonging to the genus Erica and forming part of the fynbos. The species is endemic to the Western Cape.
