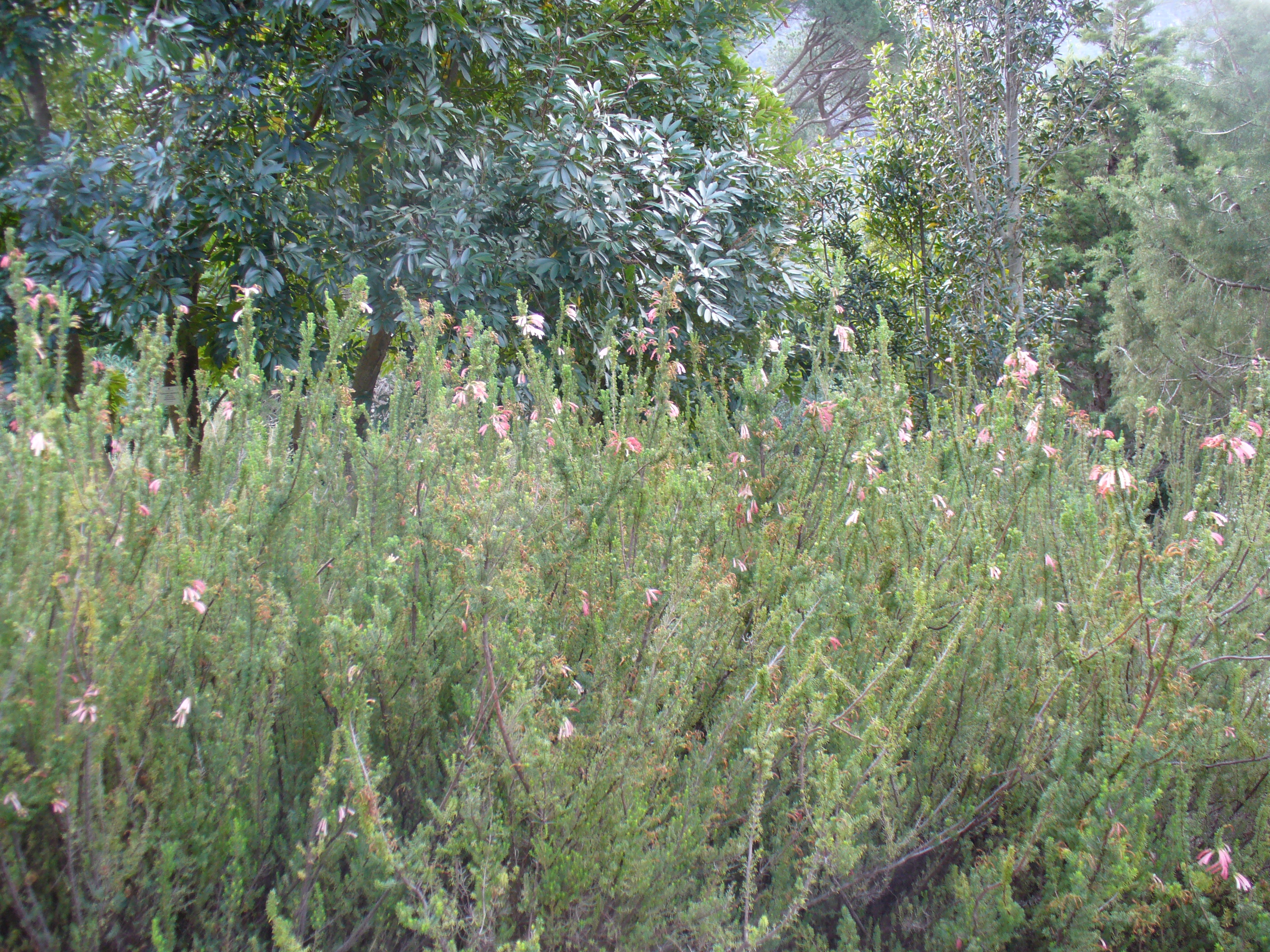

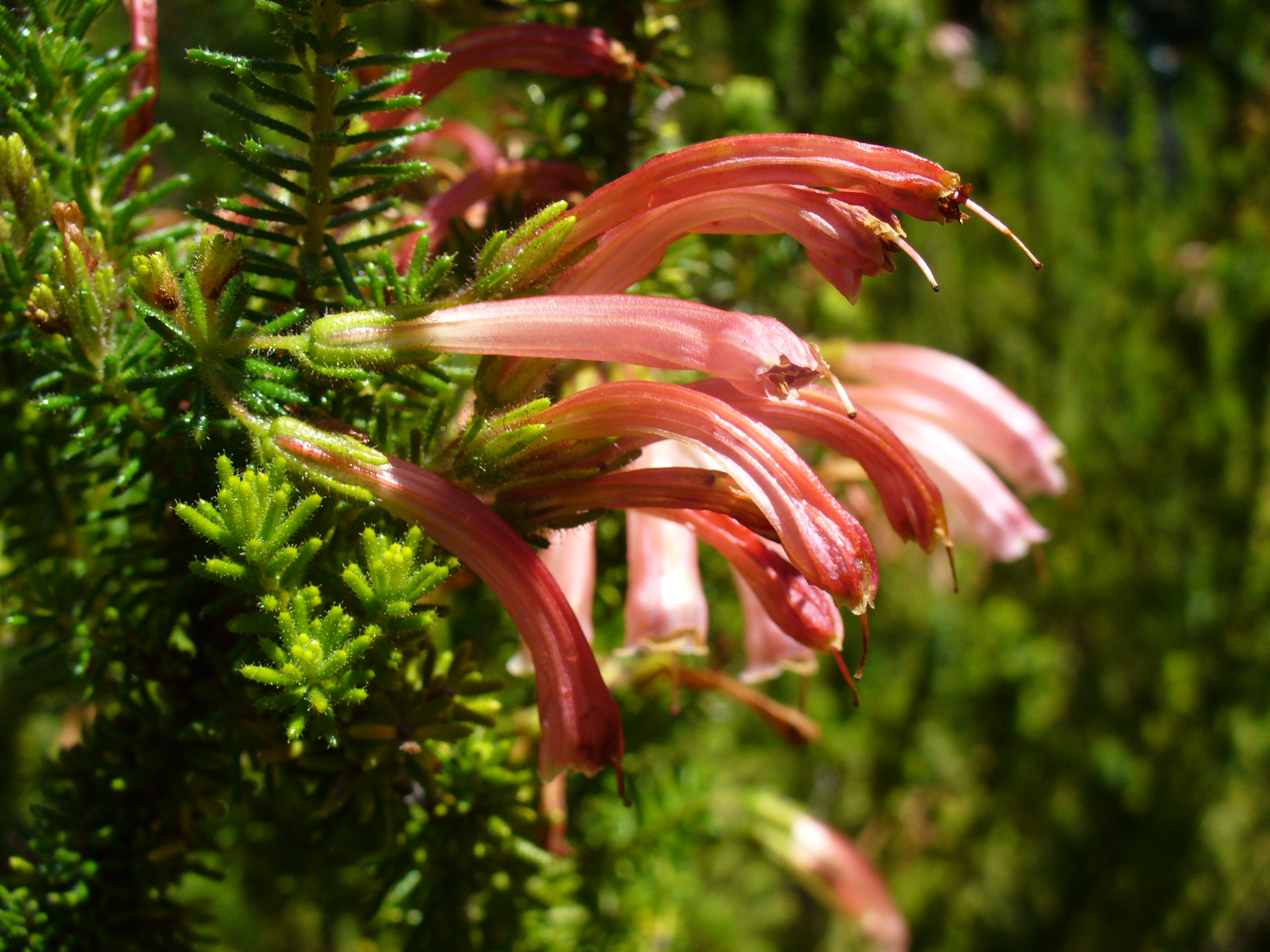

Scientific classification
- Kingdom: Plantae
- Clade: Tracheophytes
- Clade: Angiosperms
- Clade: Eudicots
- Clade: Asterids
- Order: Ericales
- Family: Ericaceae
- Genus: Erica
- Species: E. glandulosa

Binomial name
- Erica glandulosa Thunb., (1785)

Synonyms
- Erica droserifolia Tausch; Erica pellucida Andrews; Ericoides glandulosum (Thunb.) Kuntze; Syringodea glandulosa (Thunb.) G.Don

= Erica glandulosa =

Species of flowering plant

Erica glandulosa, the glandular heath or the Humansdorp glandulous heath, is a plant that belongs to the genus Erica and forms part of the fynbos. The species is endemic to the Western Cape.
