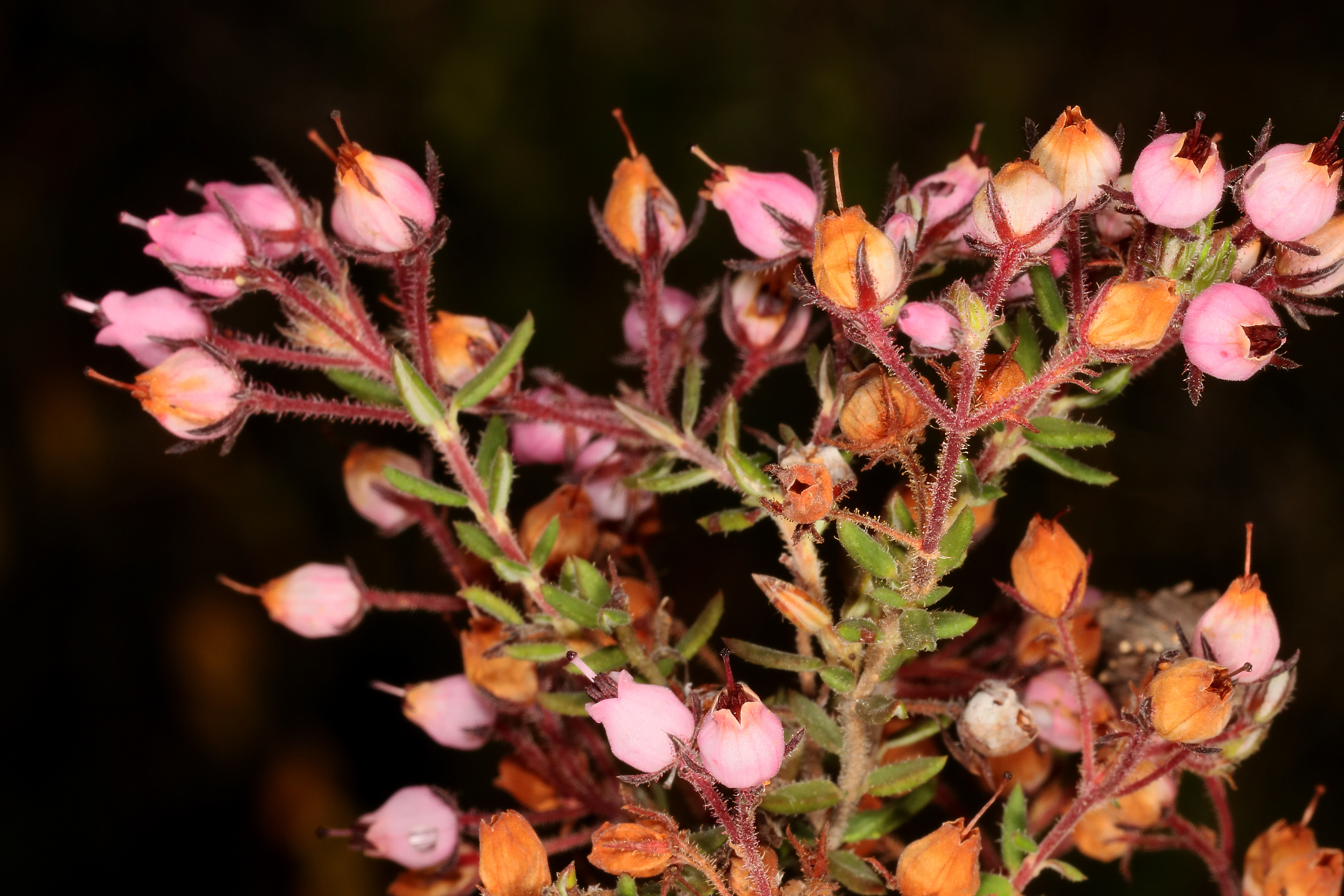

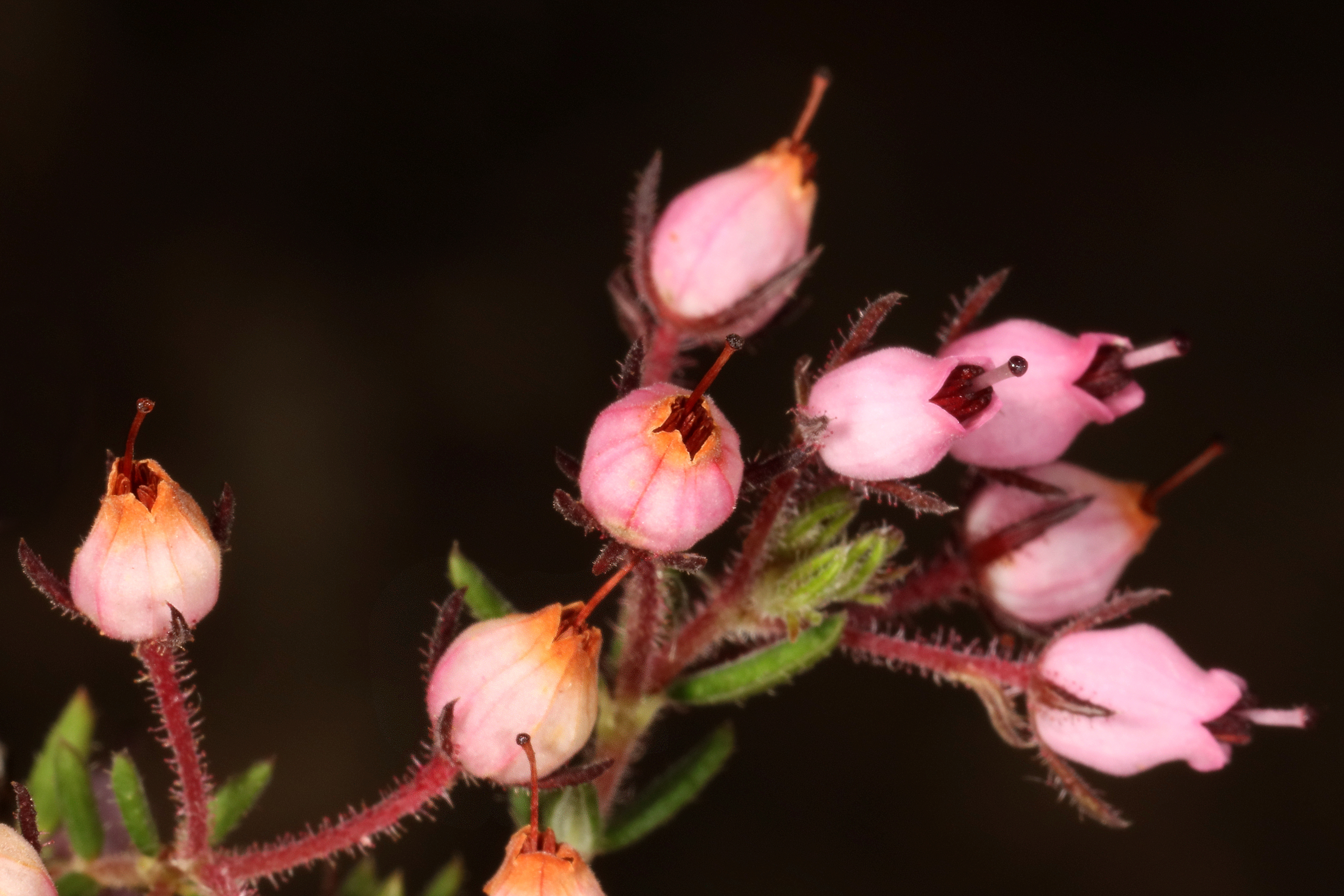

Scientific classification
- Kingdom: Plantae
- Clade: Tracheophytes
- Clade: Angiosperms
- Clade: Eudicots
- Clade: Asterids
- Order: Ericales
- Family: Ericaceae
- Genus: Erica
- Species: E. hirta

Binomial name
- Erica hirta Thunb.

Synonyms
- Erica dura G.Don; Erica urceolaris Salisb.; Ericoides hirtum (Thunb.) Kuntze

= Erica hirta =

Species of flowering plant

Erica hirta is a plant belonging to the genus Erica and forming part of the fynbos. The species is endemic to the Western Cape.
