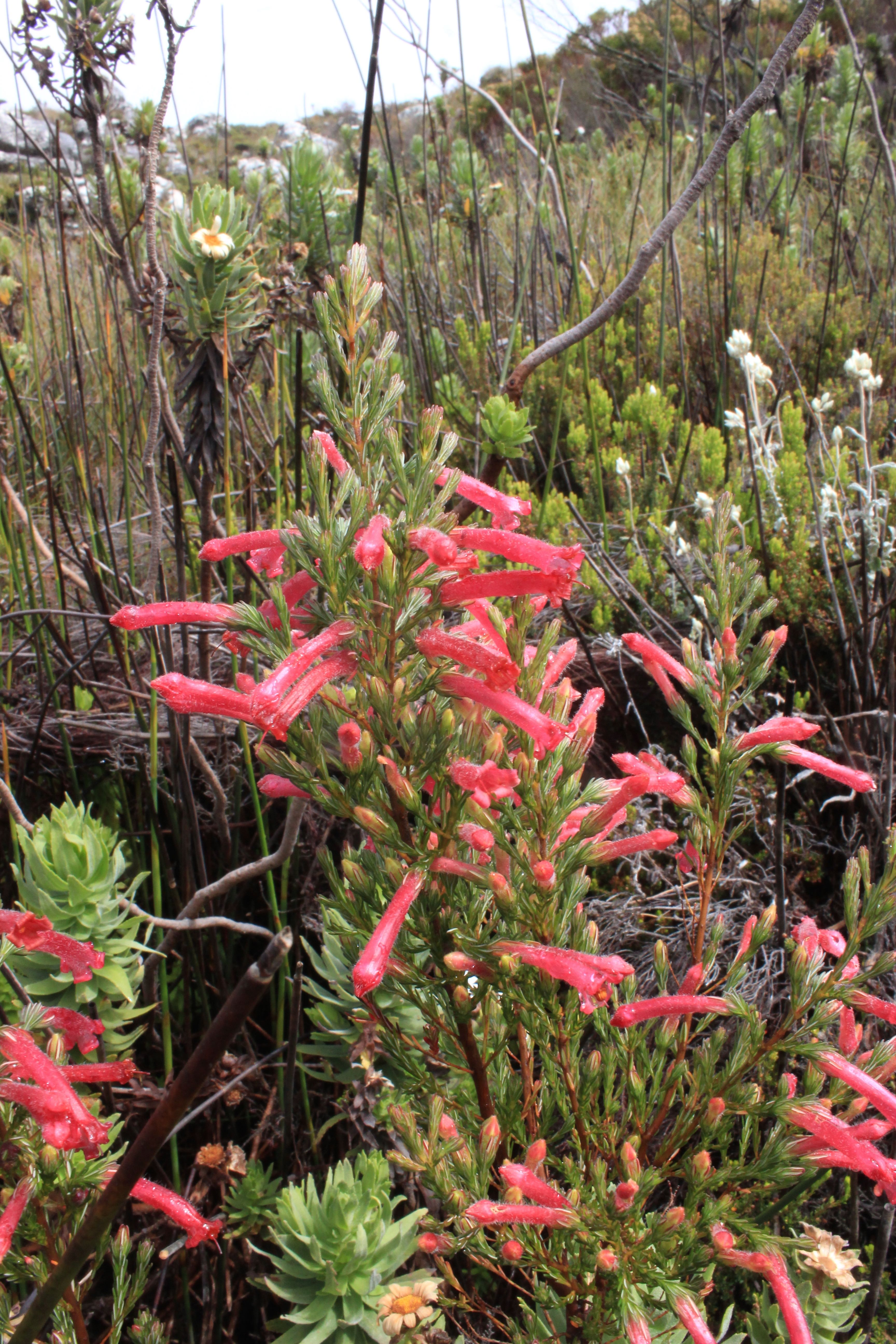

Scientific classification
- Kingdom: Plantae
- Clade: Tracheophytes
- Clade: Angiosperms
- Clade: Eudicots
- Clade: Asterids
- Order: Ericales
- Family: Ericaceae
- Genus: Erica
- Species: E. curviflora

Binomial name
- Erica curviflora L., (1802)

Synonyms
- Erica bucciniformis Salisb.; Erica burchellii Benth.; Erica coccinea L. ex Benth.; Erica cuspidigera Salisb.; Erica fastuosa Salisb.; Erica ignescens Andrews; Erica laniflora F.W.Schmidt; Erica procera J.C.Wendl.; Erica simpliciflora Willd.; Erica sordida Drège ex Benth.; Erica sulcata Benth.; Erica tubiflora L.; Erica tubiflora Willd.; Erica tubiflora Thunb.; Ericoides burchellii (Benth.) Kuntze; Ericoides curviflorum (L.) Kuntze; Ericoides sulcatum Kuntze; Ericoides tubiflorum Kuntze; Syringodea bucciniformis (Salisb.) G.Don; Syringodea curviflora G.Don; Syringodea cuspidigera (Salisb.) G.Don; Syringodea ignescens G.Don; Syringodea procera (J.C.Wendl.) G.Don; Syringodea simpliciflora (Willd.) G.Don; Syringodea tubiflora (L.) G.Don

= Erica curviflora =

Species of flowering plant

Erica curviflora, the water heath, is a plant that belongs to the genus Erica and forms part of the fynbos. The species is endemic to the Western Cape.
