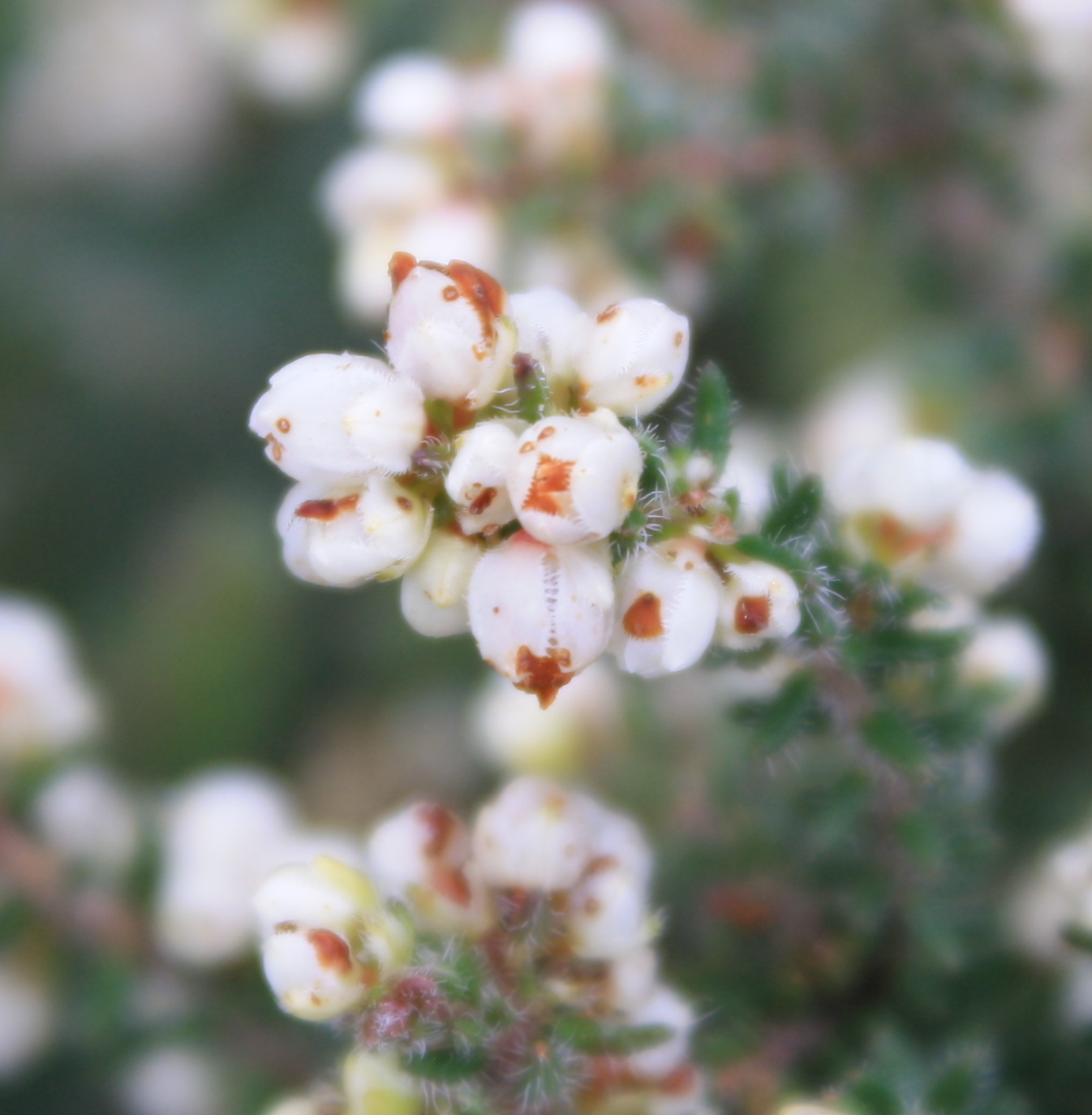

Scientific classification
- Kingdom: Plantae
- Clade: Tracheophytes
- Clade: Angiosperms
- Clade: Eudicots
- Clade: Asterids
- Order: Ericales
- Family: Ericaceae
- Genus: Erica
- Species: E. totta

Binomial name
- Erica totta Thunb., (1785)

Synonyms
- Eremia bartlingiana Klotzsch; Eremia totta (Thunb.) D.Don; Erica ferox Salisb.; Erica pectinata Bartl.; Erica totta Bartl.

= Erica totta =

Species of flowering plant

Erica totta is a plant belonging to the genus Erica and forming part of the fynbos. The species is endemic to the Western Cape.
