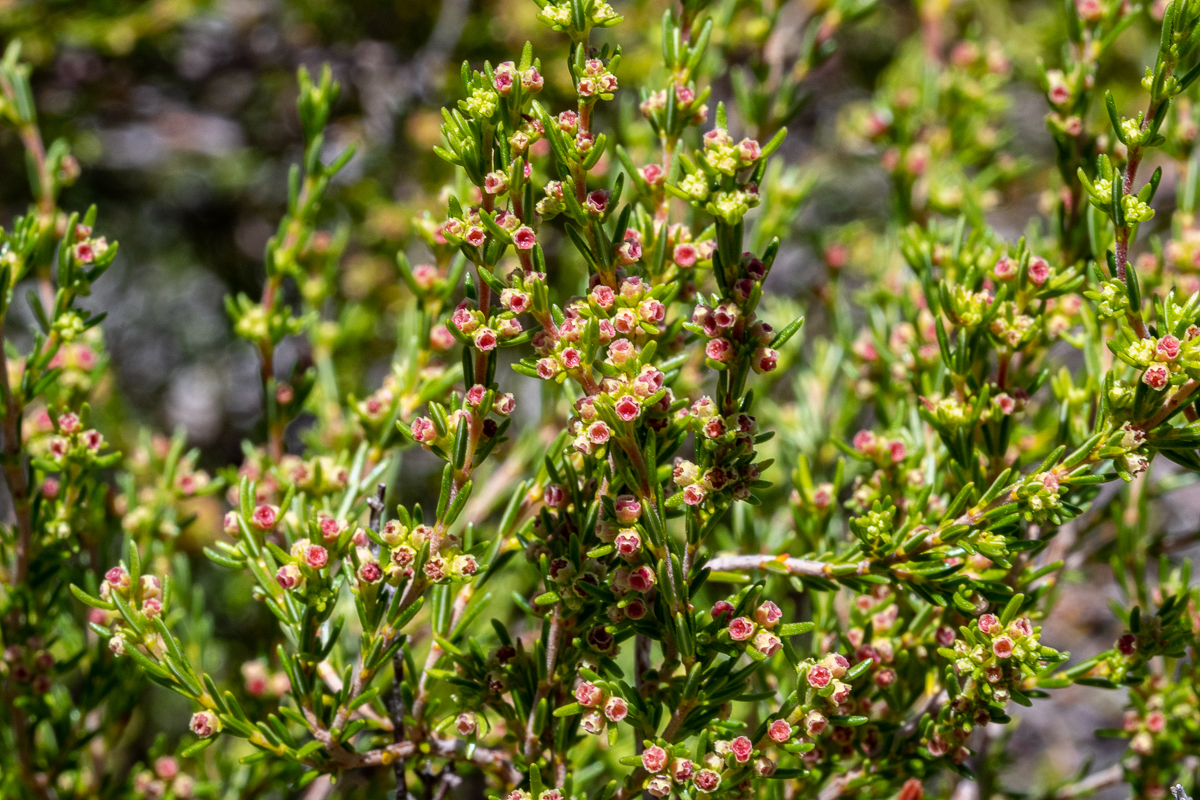

Scientific classification
- Kingdom: Plantae
- Clade: Tracheophytes
- Clade: Angiosperms
- Clade: Eudicots
- Clade: Asterids
- Order: Ericales
- Family: Ericaceae
- Genus: Erica
- Species: E. axillaris

Binomial name
- Erica axillaris Thunb.

Synonyms
- Erica calyciflora Tausch; Salaxis calyciflora (Tausch) Druce; Salaxis flexuosa Klotzsch; Salaxis flexuosa var. cognata N.E.Br.; Salaxis major N.E.Br.; Salaxis octandra Klotzsch; Salaxis puberula Klotzsch; Salaxis sieberi Benth.

= Erica axillaris =

Species of flowering plant

Erica axillaris, the ridgeseed heath, is a plant belonging to the genus Erica and forming part of the fynbos. The species is endemic to the Western Cape.
