= Erica coarctata =

Scientific classification
- Kingdom: Plantae
- Clade: Tracheophytes
- Clade: Angiosperms
- Clade: Eudicots
- Clade: Asterids
- Order: Ericales
- Family: Ericaceae
- Genus: Erica
- Species: E. coarctata

Binomial name
- Erica coarctata J.C.Wendl.

Synonyms
- Erica axillaris Sol. ex Benth.; Erica brevipes Bartl.; Erica minutiflora Andrews; Ericoides coarctatum (J.C.Wendl.) Kuntze

Species of flowering plant

Erica coarctata is a plant belonging to the genus Erica and forming part of the fynbos. The species is endemic to the Western Cape.
