= Erica unicolor =

Scientific classification
- Kingdom: Plantae
- Clade: Tracheophytes
- Clade: Angiosperms
- Clade: Eudicots
- Clade: Asterids
- Order: Ericales
- Family: Ericaceae
- Genus: Erica
- Species: E. unicolor

Binomial name
- Erica unicolor J.C.Wendl.

Synonyms
- Erica virescens Link; Erica viridescens G.Lodd. ex Sinclair

Species of flowering plant

Erica unicolor is a plant belonging to the genus Erica. The species is endemic to the Western Cape.
