= Erica esterhuyseniae =

Scientific classification
- Kingdom: Plantae
- Clade: Tracheophytes
- Clade: Angiosperms
- Clade: Eudicots
- Clade: Asterids
- Order: Ericales
- Family: Ericaceae
- Genus: Erica
- Species: E. esterhuyseniae

Binomial name
- Erica esterhuyseniae Compton

Species of flowering plant

Erica esterhuyseniae is a plant belonging to the genus Erica and forming part of the fynbos. The species is endemic to the Eastern Cape and Western Cape.
