= Catasetum laminatum =

Scientific classification
- Kingdom: Plantae
- Clade: Tracheophytes
- Clade: Angiosperms
- Clade: Monocots
- Order: Asparagales
- Family: Orchidaceae
- Subfamily: Epidendroideae
- Genus: Catasetum
- Species: C. laminatum

Binomial name
- Catasetum laminatum Lindl. (1840)
- The range of the Catasetum laminatum

Synonyms
- Catasetum laminatum var. eburneum Lindl. (1840); Catasetum laminatum var. maculatum Lindl. (1840)

Species of orchid

Catasetum laminatum, the scaled catasetum, is a species of orchid found in Mexico, first formally described by John Lindley in 1840.
