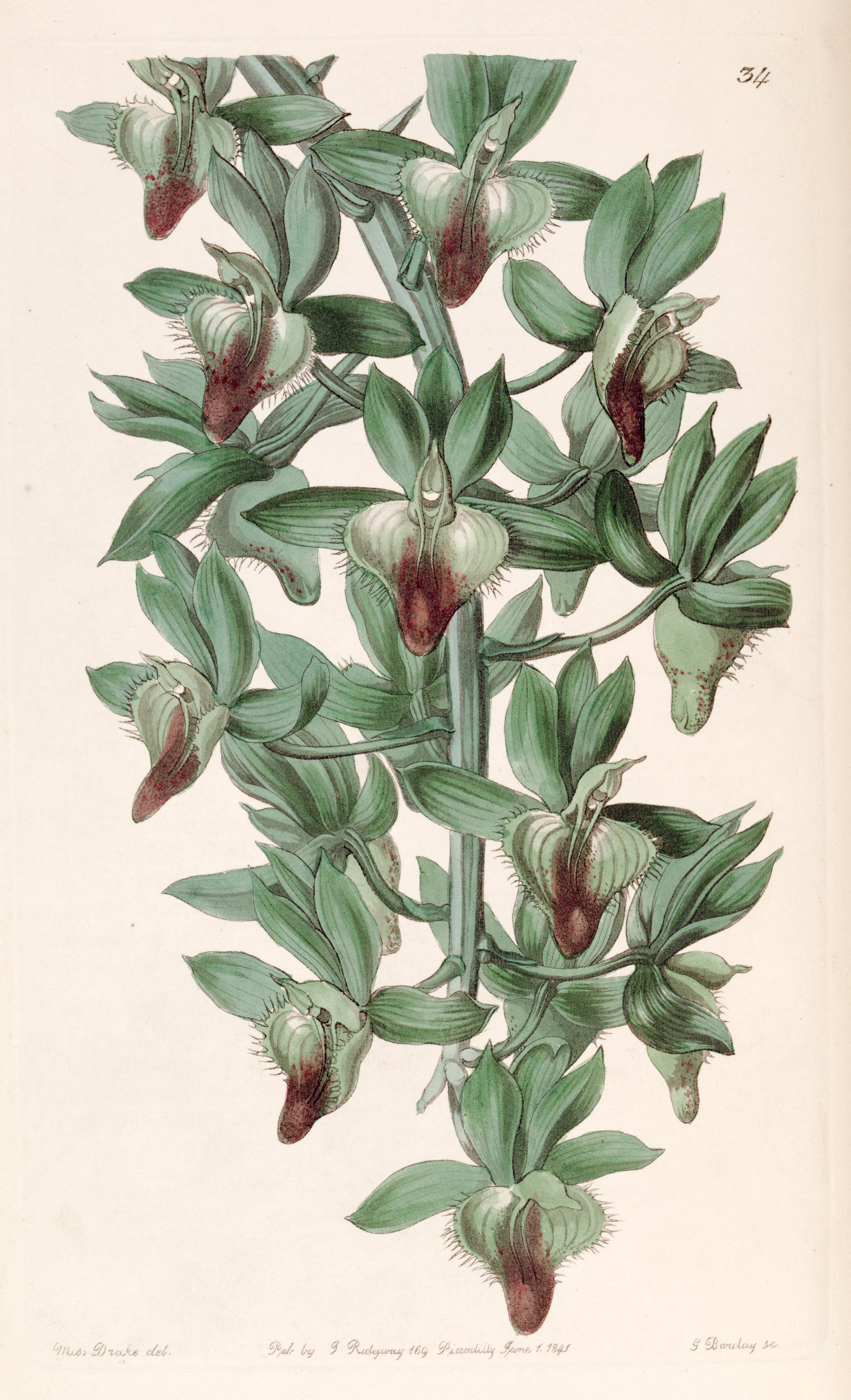

Scientific classification
- Kingdom: Plantae
- Clade: Tracheophytes
- Clade: Angiosperms
- Clade: Monocots
- Order: Asparagales
- Family: Orchidaceae
- Subfamily: Epidendroideae
- Genus: Catasetum
- Species: C. socco

Binomial name
- Catasetum socco (Vell.) Hoehne (1952)

Synonyms
- Cypripedium socco Vell. (1831) (Basionym); Catasetum trulla Lindl. (1840); Catasetum trulla var. subimberbe Rchb.f. (1887); Catasetum trulla var. maculatissimum Rchb.f. (1888); Catasetum lichtensteinii Kraenzl. (1892); Paphiopedilum socco (Vell.) Pfitzer (1894); Catasetum trulla var. lichtensteinii (Kraenzl.) Mansf. (1932); Catasetum trulla var. typum Hoehne (1942)

= Catasetum socco =

Species of orchid

Catasetum socco is a species of orchid found in south-eastern Brazil.
