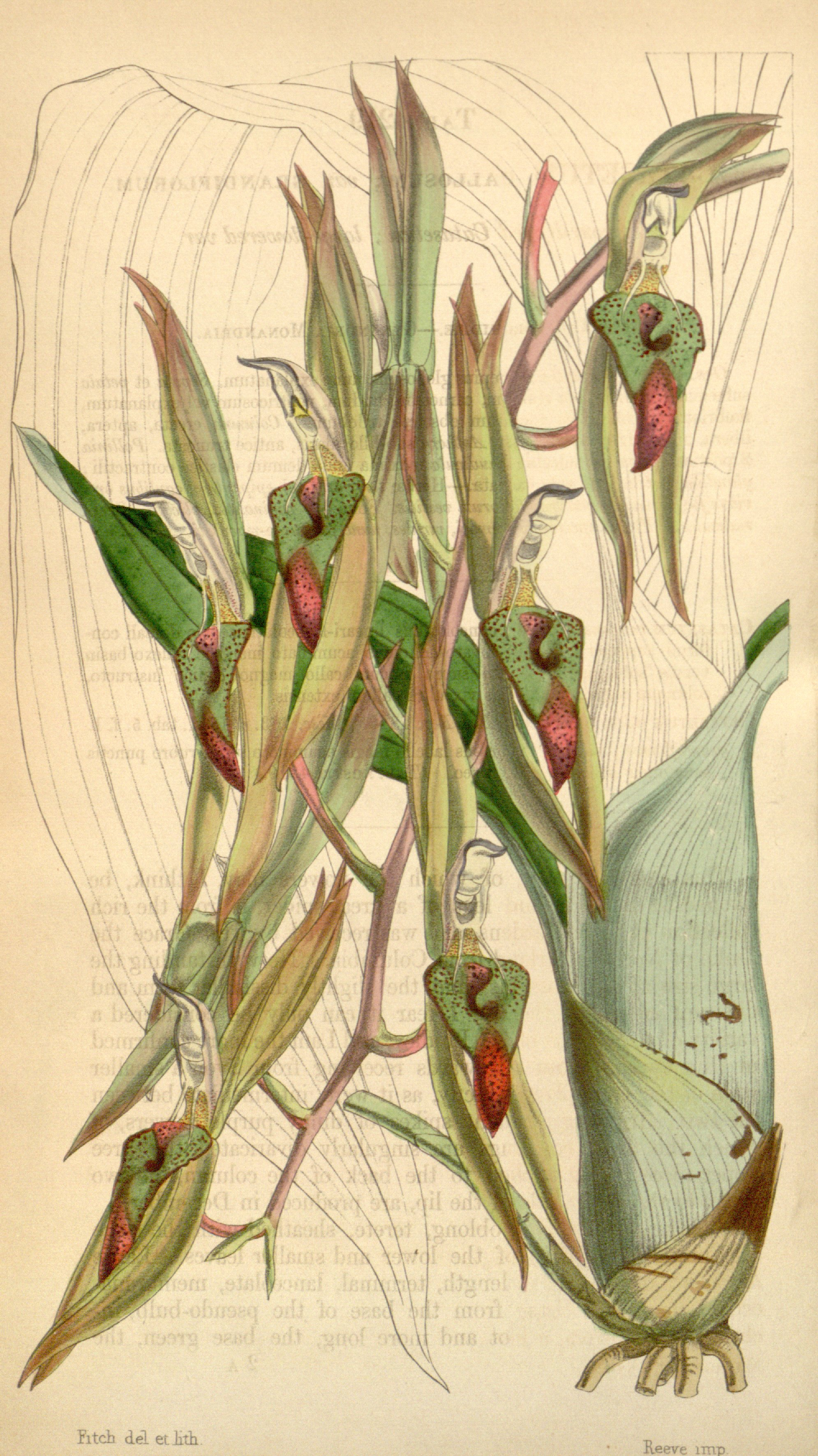

Scientific classification
- Kingdom: Plantae
- Clade: Tracheophytes
- Clade: Angiosperms
- Clade: Monocots
- Order: Asparagales
- Family: Orchidaceae
- Subfamily: Epidendroideae
- Genus: Catasetum
- Species: C. callosum

Binomial name
- Catasetum callosum Lindl. (1840)

Synonyms
- Catasetum recurvatum Link, Klotzsch & Otto (1826); Catasetum fuliginosum Lindl. (1841); Catasetum callosum var. grandiflorum Hook. (1846); Catasetum landsbergii Lindl. & Paxton (1850); Myanthus landsbergii (Lindl. & Paxton) Reinw. & de Vriese (1851); Catasetum acallosum Lindl. ex Rchb.f. (1854); Myanthus callosus Beer (1854); Myanthus grandiflorus Beer (1854); Catasetum fuliginosum Rolfe (1887); Catasetum darwinianum Rolfe (1889); Catasetum arachnoides Ames (1898); Catasetum arachnoideum Ames (1898); Catasetum callosum var. eucallosum Mansf. (1932); Catasetum callosum var. typum Hoehne (1942)

= Catasetum callosum =

Species of orchid

Catasetum callosum, the callused catasetum, is a species of orchid.
