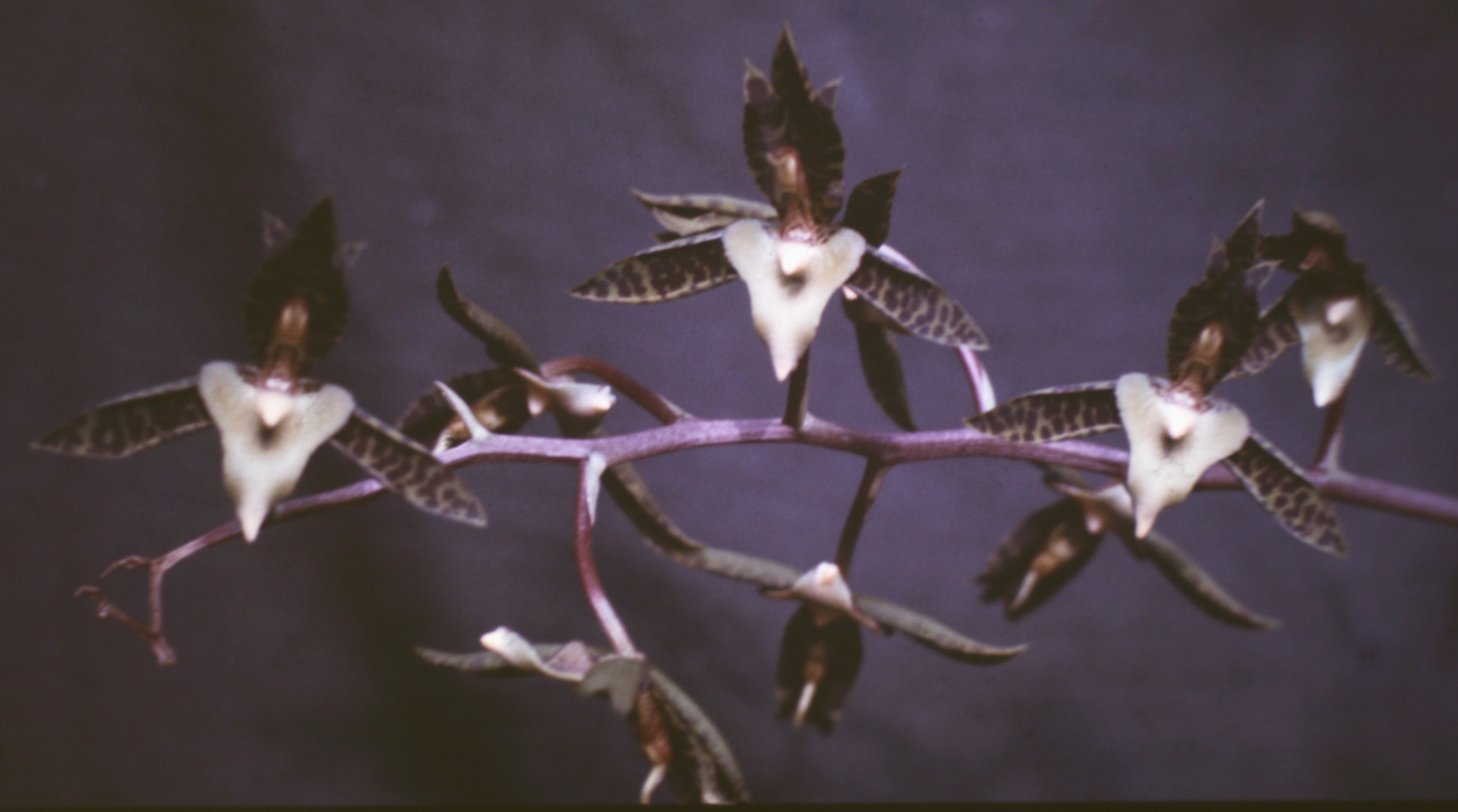
- Ctsm. deltoideum male flowers
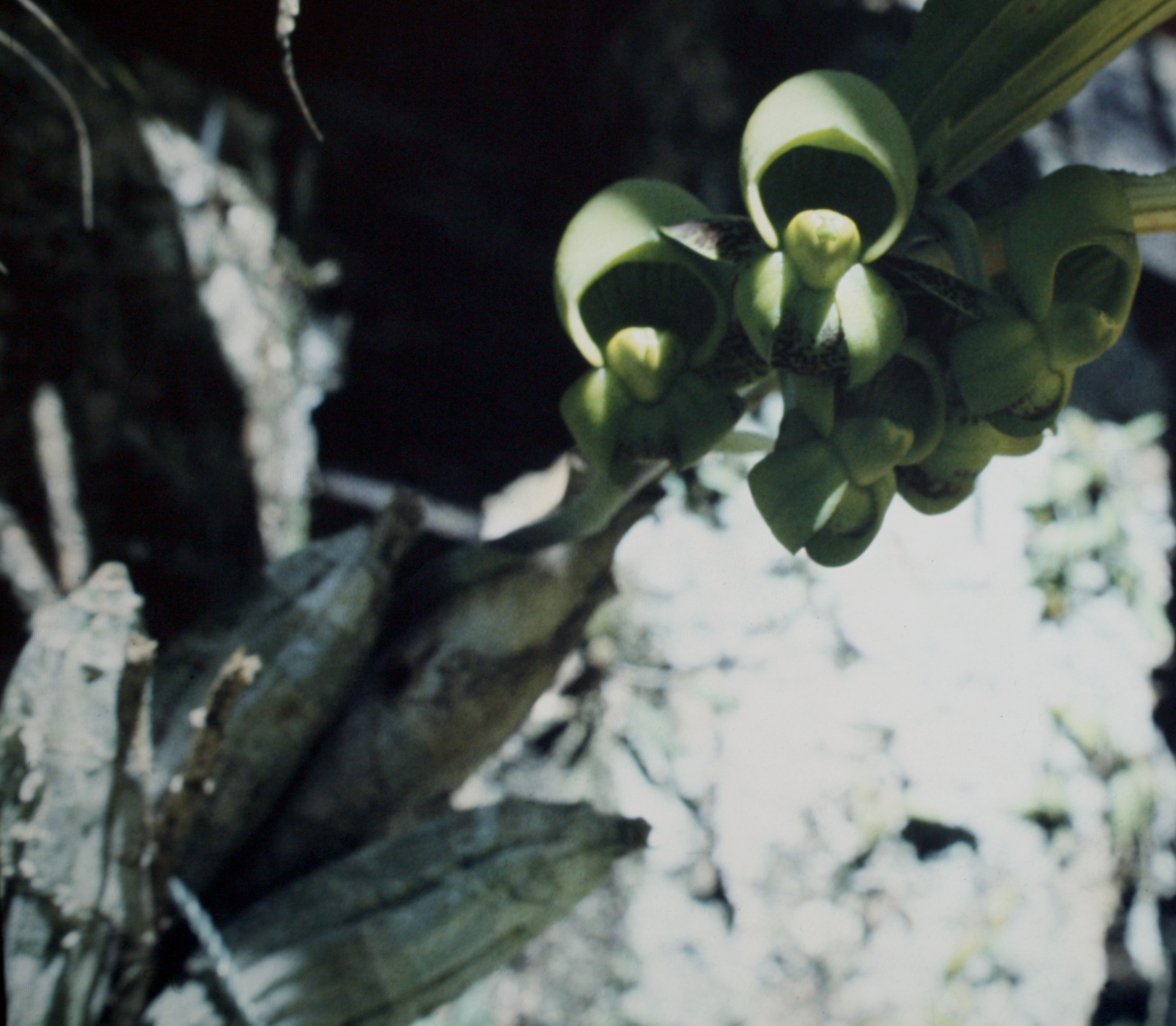
- Ctsm. deltoideum female flowers (with some male form)

Scientific classification
- Kingdom: Plantae
- Clade: Tracheophytes
- Clade: Angiosperms
- Clade: Monocots
- Order: Asparagales
- Family: Orchidaceae
- Subfamily: Epidendroideae
- Genus: Catasetum
- Species: C. deltoideum

Binomial name
- Catasetum deltoideum (Lindl.) Mutel (1837)

Synonyms
- Myanthus deltoideus Lindl. (1836) (Basionym)

= Catasetum deltoideum =

Species of neotropical orchid

Catasetum deltoideum, the triangular catasetum, is a species of orchid found from Guyana, French Guiana, Suriname and Brazil.

== Description ==
This medium-sized orchid is epiphytic in forest at higher elevations.

It has oblong-fusiform stems (pseudobulbs) carrying deciduous, ridged, many nerved, oblong-lanceolate, acute leaves. The leaves 4–5. Inflorescence arching to horizontal, 8-10 flowered. Male flowers resupinate, triangular. sepals and petals are lanceolate, dark green marked with maroon. lip also triangular, white. Female flowers green. sepals and petals recurved.
