= Catasetum matogrossense =

Scientific classification
- Kingdom: Plantae
- Clade: Tracheophytes
- Clade: Angiosperms
- Clade: Monocots
- Order: Asparagales
- Family: Orchidaceae
- Subfamily: Epidendroideae
- Genus: Catasetum
- Species: C. matogrossense

Binomial name
- Catasetum matogrossense Hamilton Dias Bicalho
- The distribution of the Catasetum matogrossense

Species of orchid

Catasetum matogrossense, the Mato Grosso catasetum, is an epiphytic pseudobulbeous species of orchid endemic to Brazil.

== Description ==
Catasetum matogrossense is a small, warm to hot-growing epiphyte with subfusiform pseudobulbs. It blooms in the fall with 6 cm (2.4 in) flowers. Its flowers are usually green in the lip and pink or white in its petals.

== Distribution ==
It is native to central parts of Brazil, specifically Goiás, Mato Grosso, Mato Grosso do Sul, and Distrito Federal (Central-West Region) in dry areas. It is threatened for extinction by the Angiosperm Extinction Risk Prediction v1.

== Care ==
Catasetum matogrossense needs around 45000 lux, 55% shade, and 57.5% relative humidity. It also goes into a leaf-drop state during winter like other Catasetum species.

== Taxonomy and etymology ==
Catasetum matogrossense was first formally described in Loefgrenia 17:1 by Hamilton Dias Bicalho in 1964. It is named after Brazillian state Mato Grosso.
