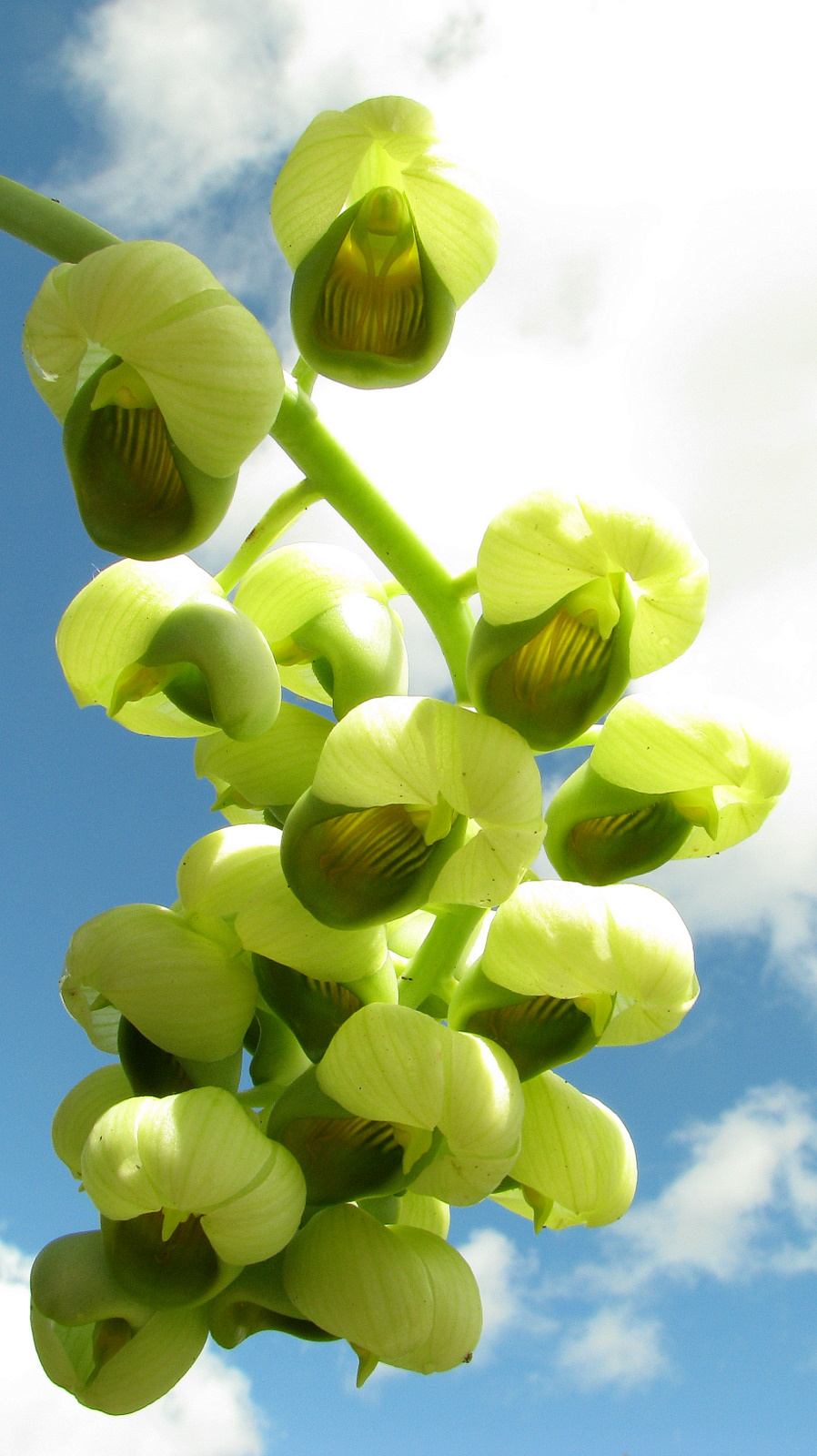

Scientific classification
- Kingdom: Plantae
- Clade: Tracheophytes
- Clade: Angiosperms
- Clade: Monocots
- Order: Asparagales
- Family: Orchidaceae
- Subfamily: Epidendroideae
- Genus: Catasetum
- Species: C. luridum

Binomial name
- Catasetum luridum (Link) Lindl. (1833)

Synonyms
- Anguloa lurida Link (1824) (Basionym); Epidendrum ollare Vell. (1831); Catasetum abruptum Hook. )1842); Catasetum lituratum Hoffmanns. (1842); Catasetum squalidum Hoffmanns. (1842)

= Catasetum luridum =

Species of orchid

Catasetum luridum, the pale-yellow catasetum, is a species of orchid. It is native to South America, where it is distributed from Guyana to Brazil.
