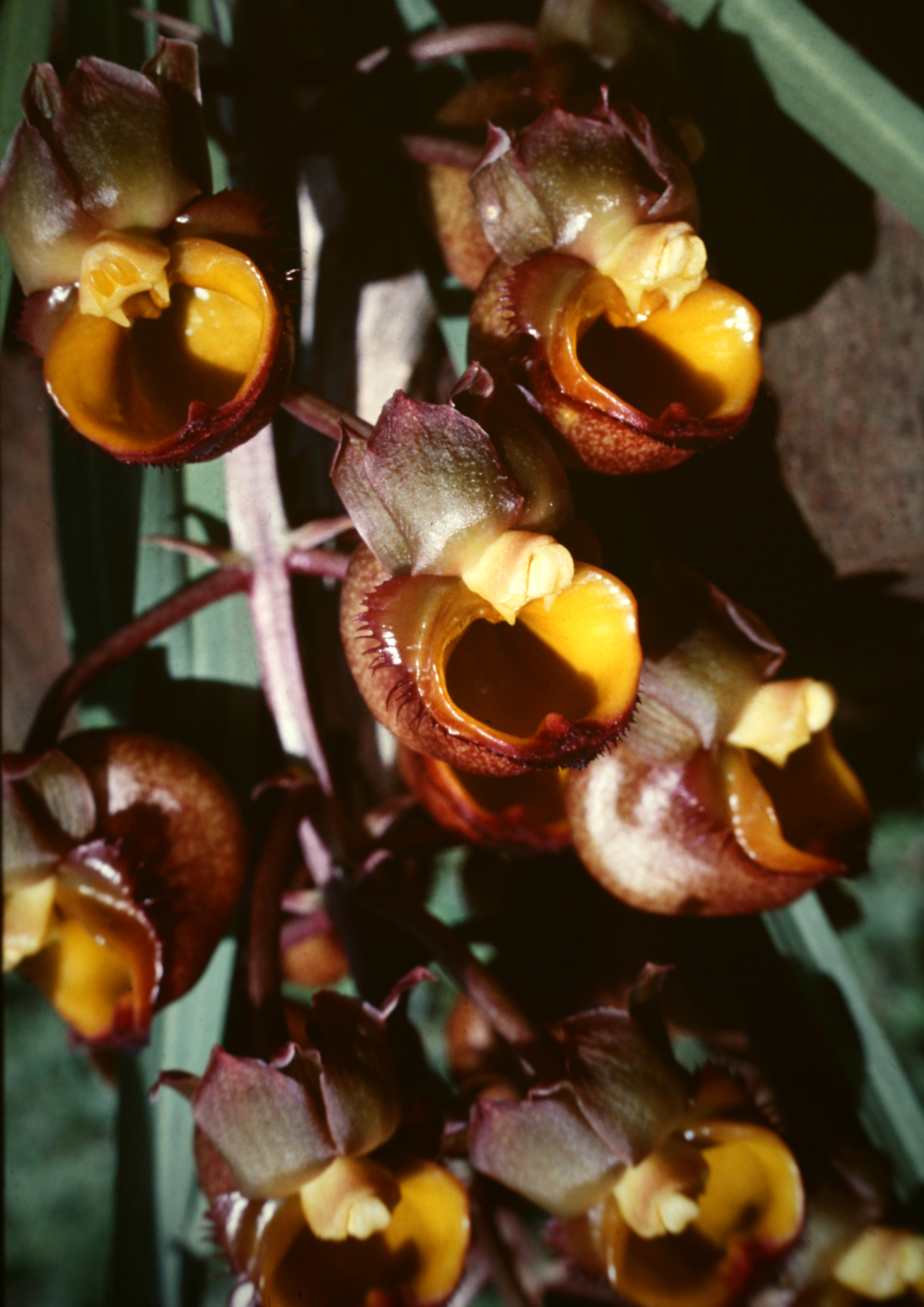

Scientific classification
- Kingdom: Plantae
- Clade: Tracheophytes
- Clade: Angiosperms
- Clade: Monocots
- Order: Asparagales
- Family: Orchidaceae
- Subfamily: Epidendroideae
- Genus: Catasetum
- Species: C. longifolium

Binomial name
- Catasetum longifolium Lindl. (1839)

Synonyms
- Monachanthus longifolius (Lindl.) Lindl. (1840)

= Catasetum longifolium =

Species of orchid

Catasetum longifolium is a species of orchid found from northern South America to northern Brazil.
