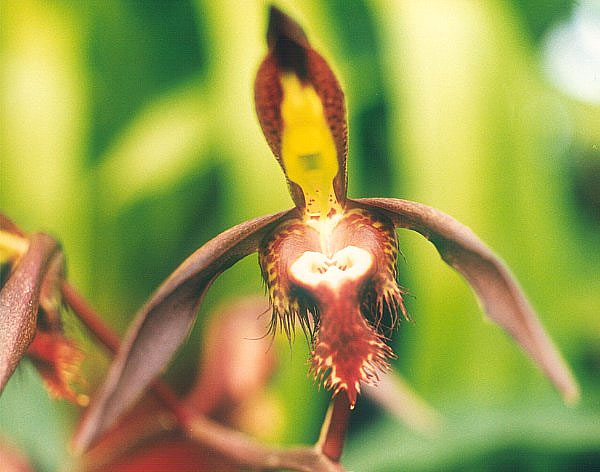
- Catasetum saccatum

Scientific classification
- Kingdom: Plantae
- Clade: Tracheophytes
- Clade: Angiosperms
- Clade: Monocots
- Order: Asparagales
- Family: Orchidaceae
- Subfamily: Epidendroideae
- Tribe: Cymbidieae
- Subtribe: Catasetinae
- Genus: Catasetum; Rich. ex Kunth

Type species
- Catasetum macrocarpum Rich. ex Kunth

Synonyms
- Catachaetum Hoffmanns.; Cuculina Raf.; Monachanthus Lindl.; Myanthus Lindl.

= Catasetum =

Genus of orchids

Catasetum, abbreviated as Ctsm. in horticultural trade, is a genus of showy epiphytic Orchids, family Orchidaceae, subfamily Epidendroideae, tribe Cymbidieae, subtribe Catasetinae, with currently 200 accepted species, many of which are highly prized in horticulture.

Species of the genus Catasetum occur from Mexico to Argentina, including much of Central America, the West Indies, and South America. The largest number of species is in Brazil.

== Biology ==
They have thick, cigar-shaped pseudobulbs which are clustered. The leaves are pleated in the upper part and deciduous. The pseudobulbs become spiny after the leaves have dropped.

=== Pollination ===
Eulaema cingulata orchid bee showing pollinia attachment points of C. saccatum and C. discolor

The inflorescence is borne on the basis. It consists of very fleshy flowers that are unisexual, which is very unusual for orchids. The colorful male and yellowish-green female flowers are typically situated on different plants, a phenomenon known as dioecy. Which type of flower a plant produces is determined by the conditions under which it grows. Male and female flowers are markedly different in size and color. Initially, taxonomists thought they were dealing with different species, a puzzle which Charles Darwin resolved when writing Fertilisation of Orchids. There are rare cases in which a single plant in intermediate conditions will produce both male and female flowers.

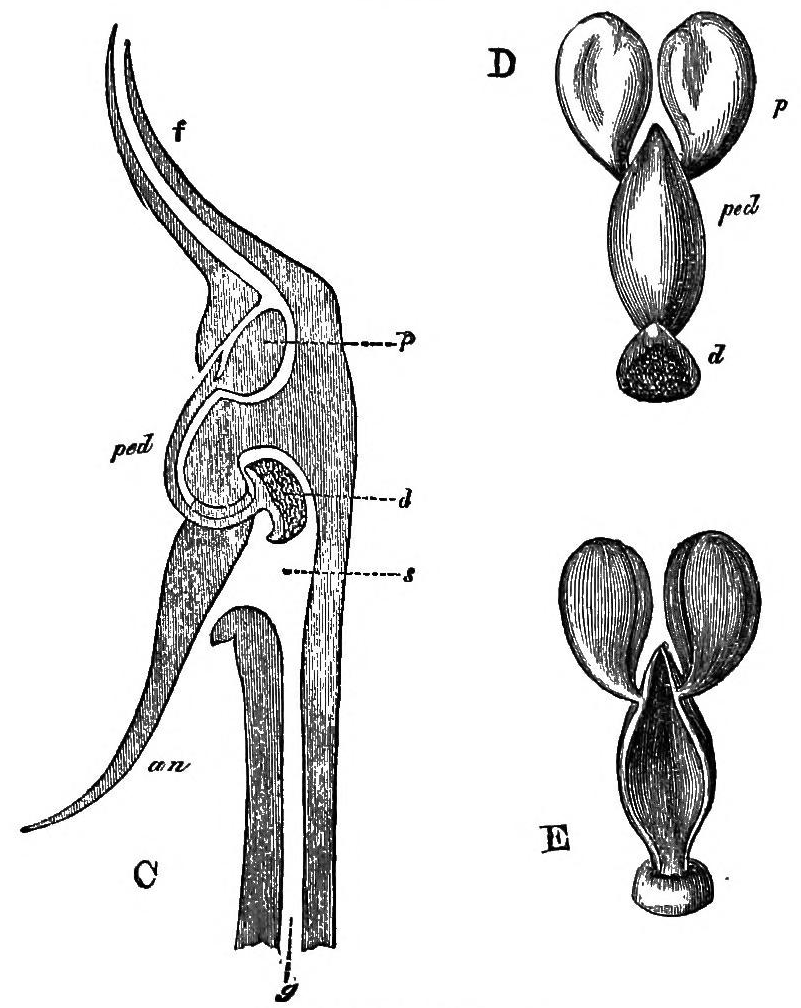
Illustration of C. saccatum's (C) column cross section and (D-E) pollinia

The male flowers have a remarkable technique for the ejection of the pollinia. Sack-shaped Catasetum (Catasetum saccatum), a tropical South American species, discussed by Darwin, actually launches its viscid pollen sacs with explosive force, when an insect touches a seta. He was ridiculed for reporting this by the naturalist Thomas Huxley.

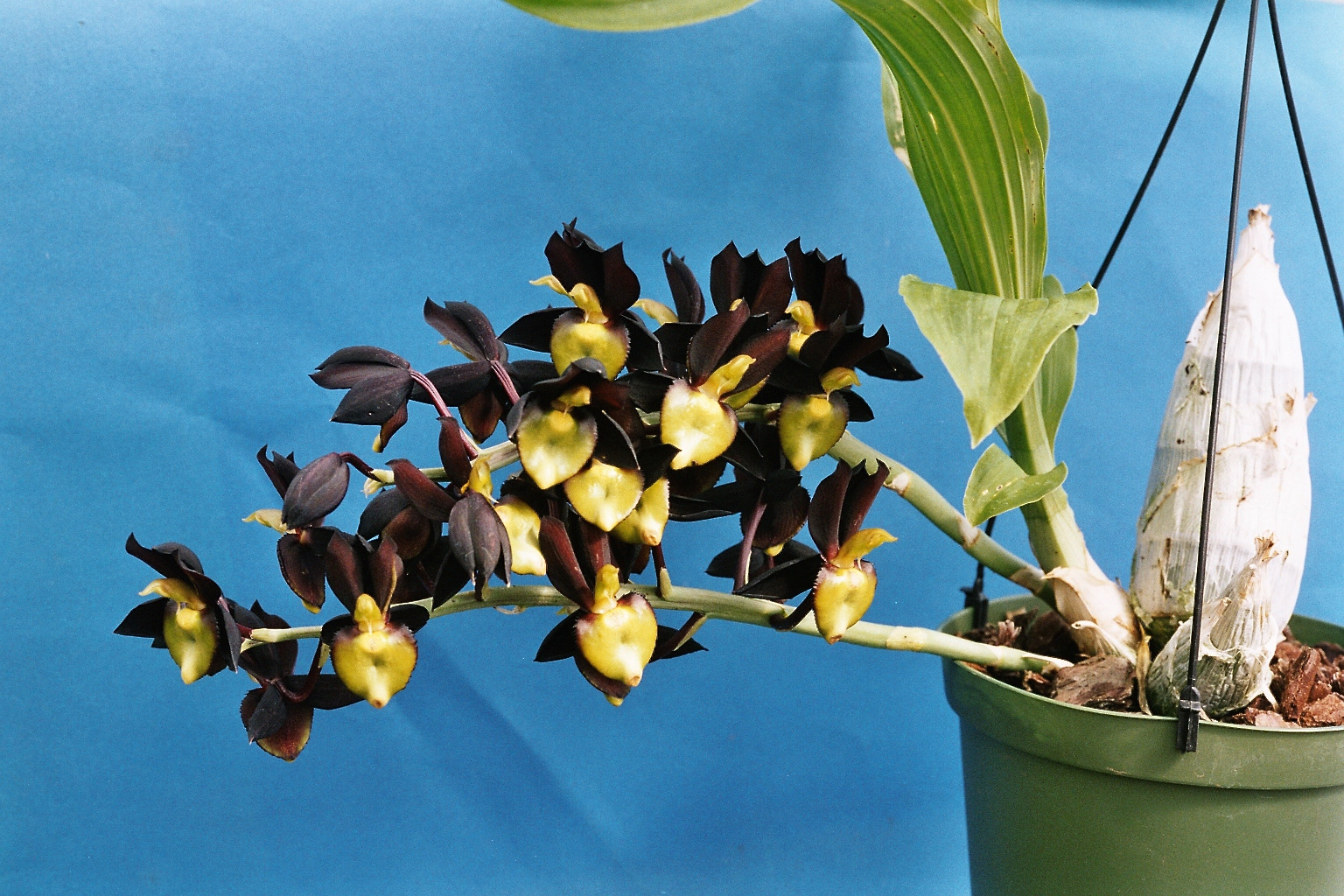
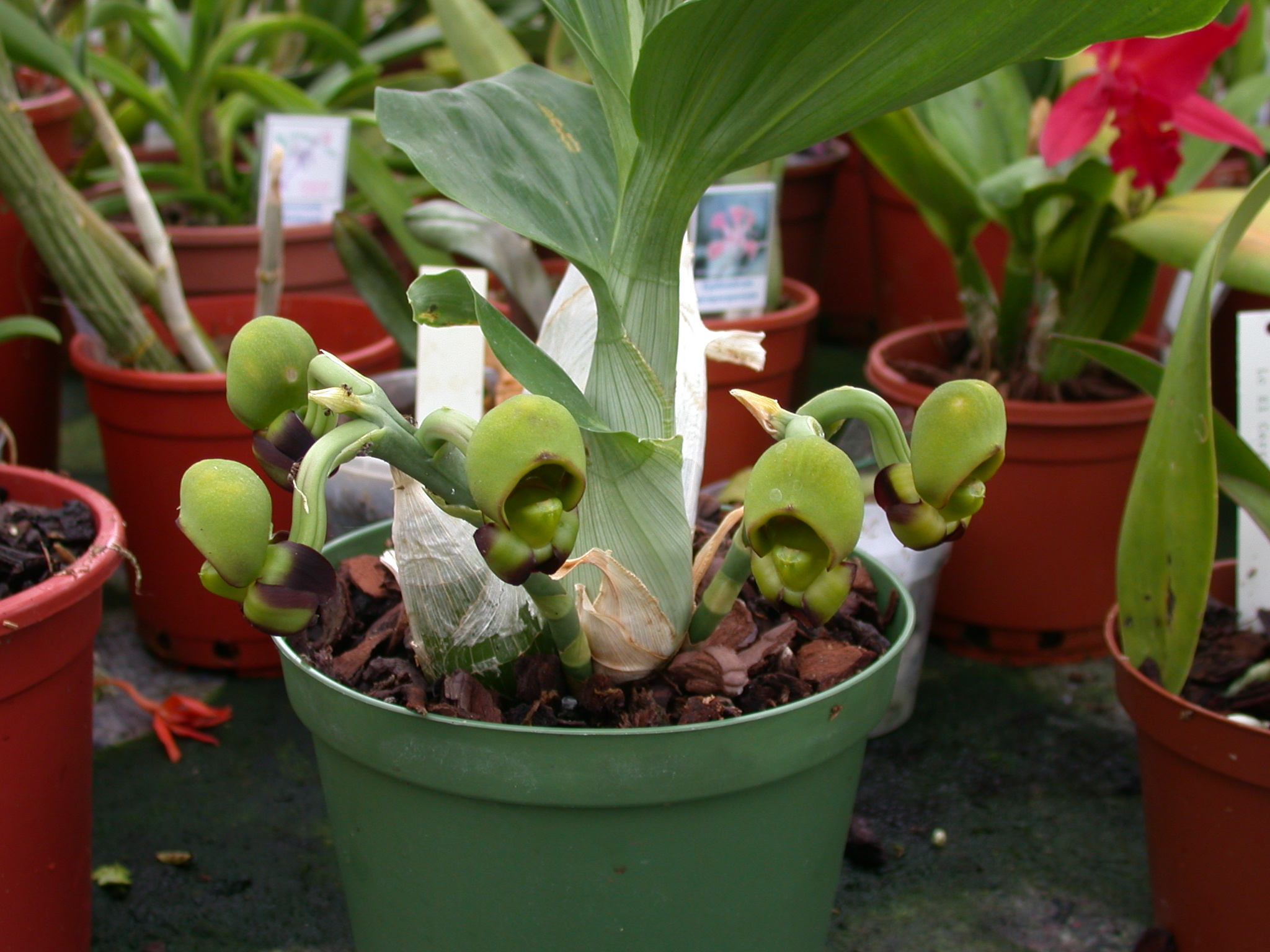
Male (left) and female (right) flowers of Catasetum tenebrosum

=== Growth ===
In habitat, these plants predominantly grow as epiphytes in very wet forests. Species of this genus all host wood-devouring mycorrhizal fungi which supplement the plants' nutrition by breaking down decomposing wood. Most of these species have a prolonged saprophytic stage in decomposing wood as seedlings before developing leaves and photosynthesis. Fungi which break down wood require a nitrogen source since wood is primarily composed solely of hemi-cellulose, cellulose, and lignin and lacks nitrogen, and these plants are heavy feeders with high nitrogen requirements typically.

Many of these species are known to germinate in ant nests high in the canopy and host ant colonies, which provide the plants with an abundant supply of nitrogen, and they also host ants in cultivation frequently. Most of these species are considered moderately difficult to maintain in cultivation without a greenhouse or Wardian case and some of them defy cultivation. Most of them cannot tolerate dryness and some of them have very specific temperature requirements. Some of these species are ant plants and attract ant colonies and can become a nuisance in cultivation.

== Species ==
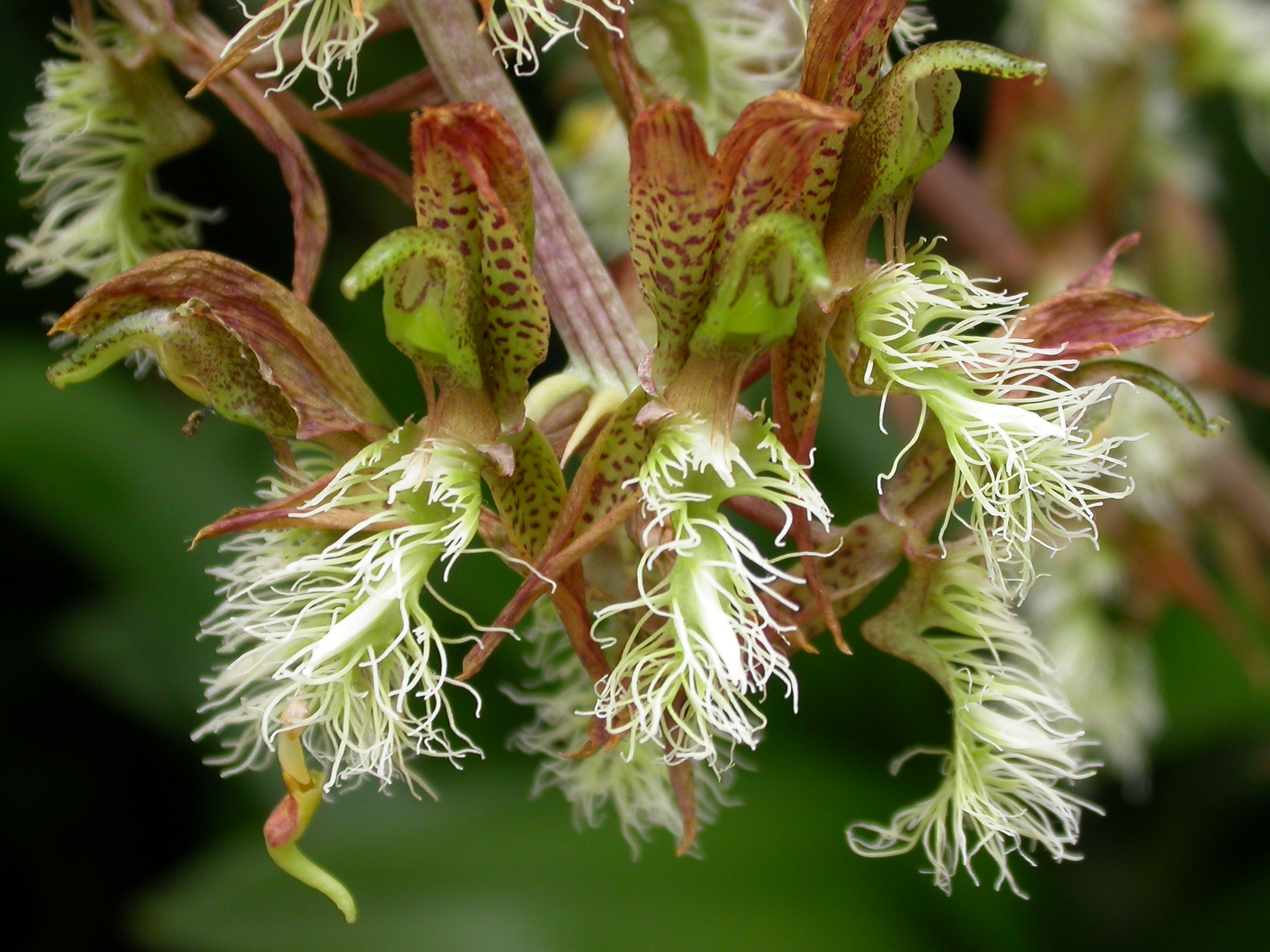
Catasetum barbatum

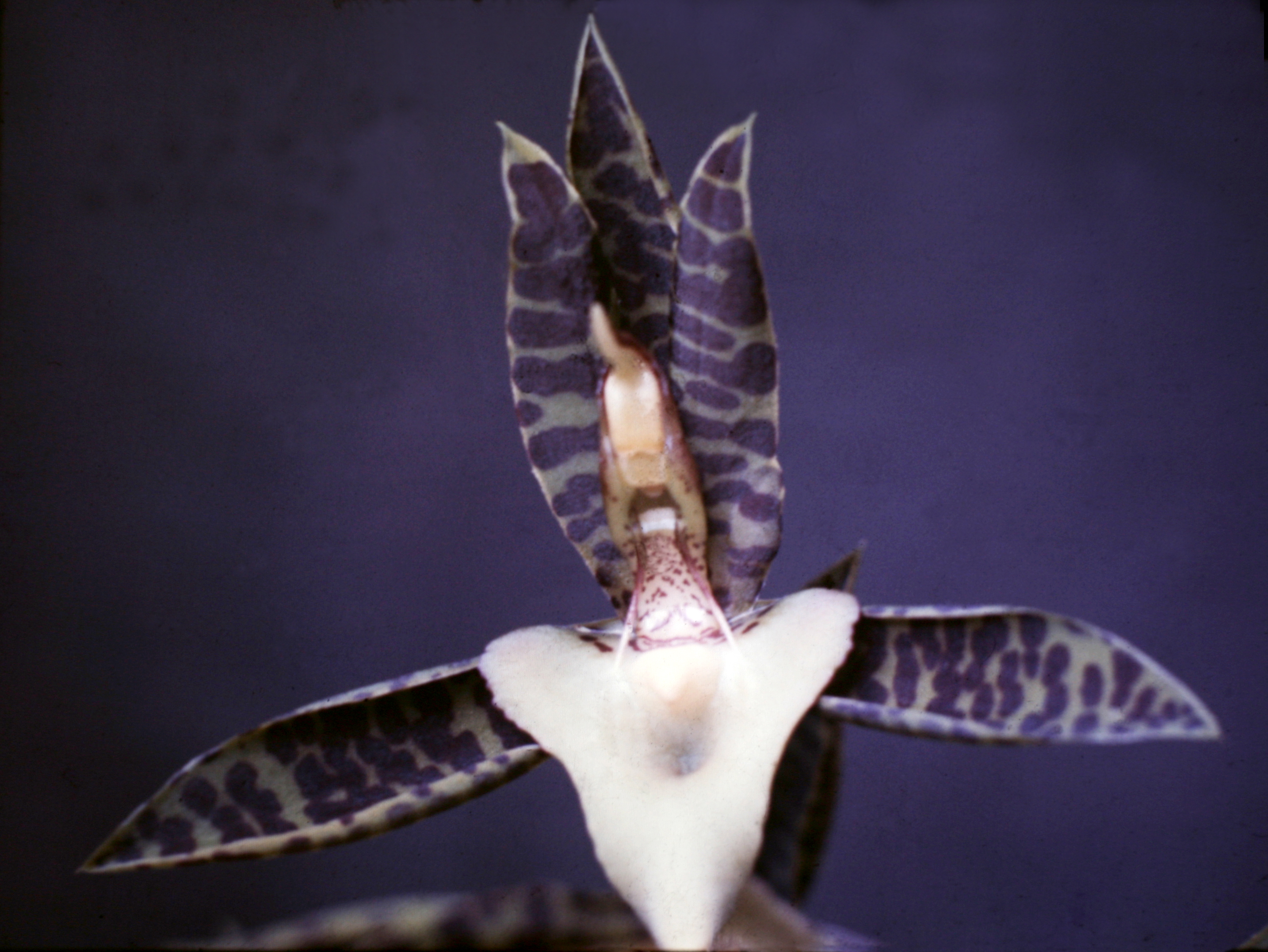
Catasetum deltoideum

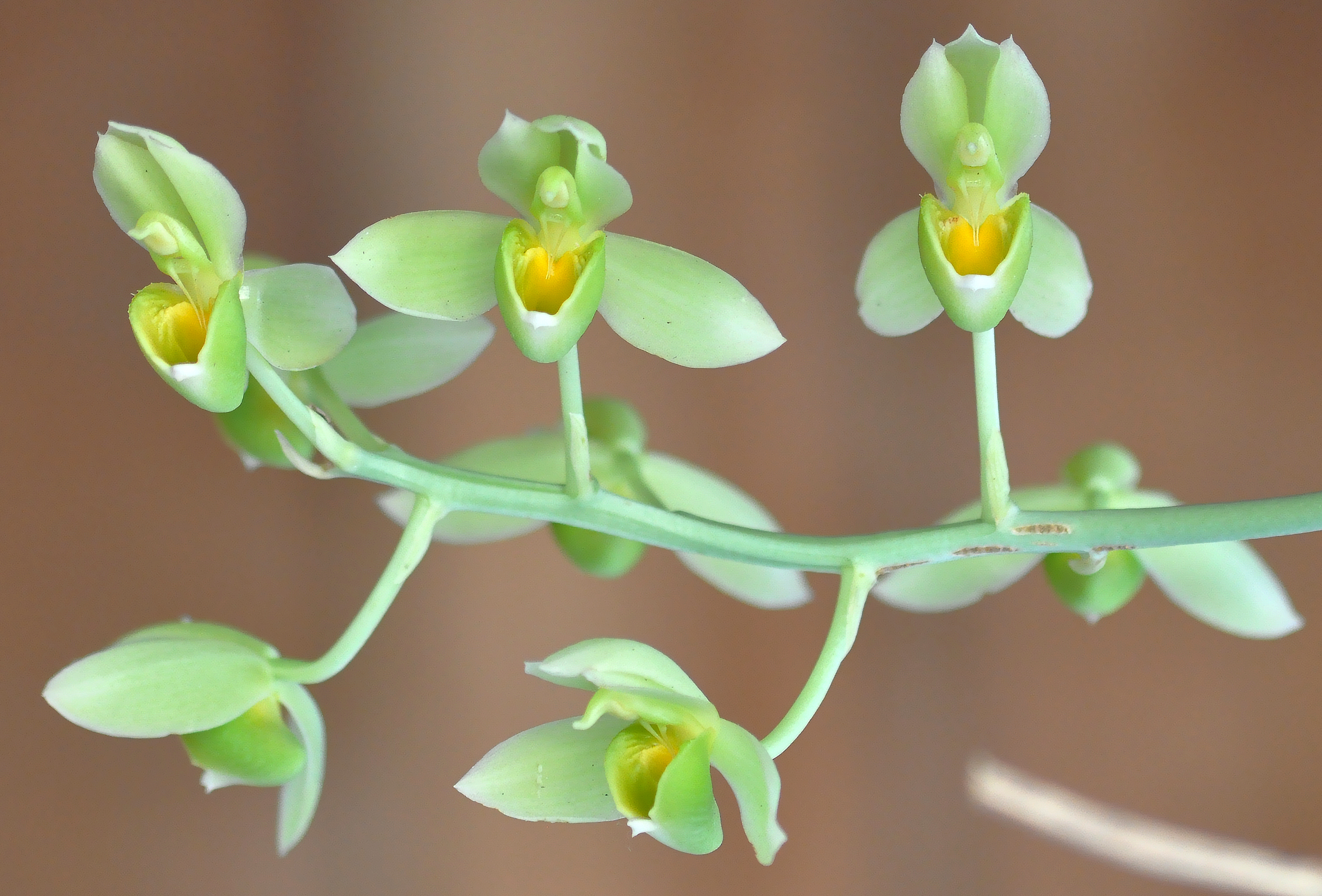
Catasetum complanatum

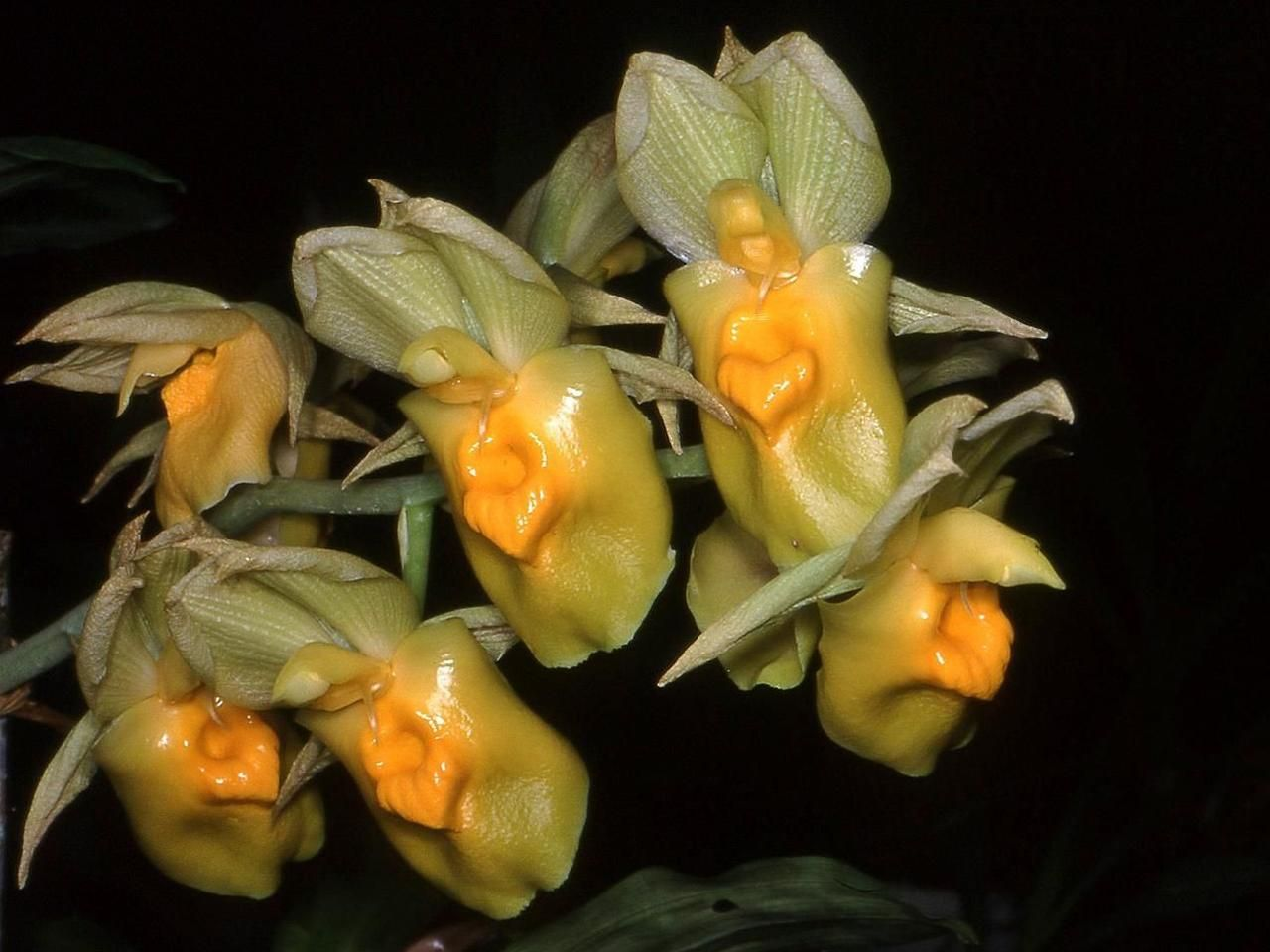
Catasetum expansum

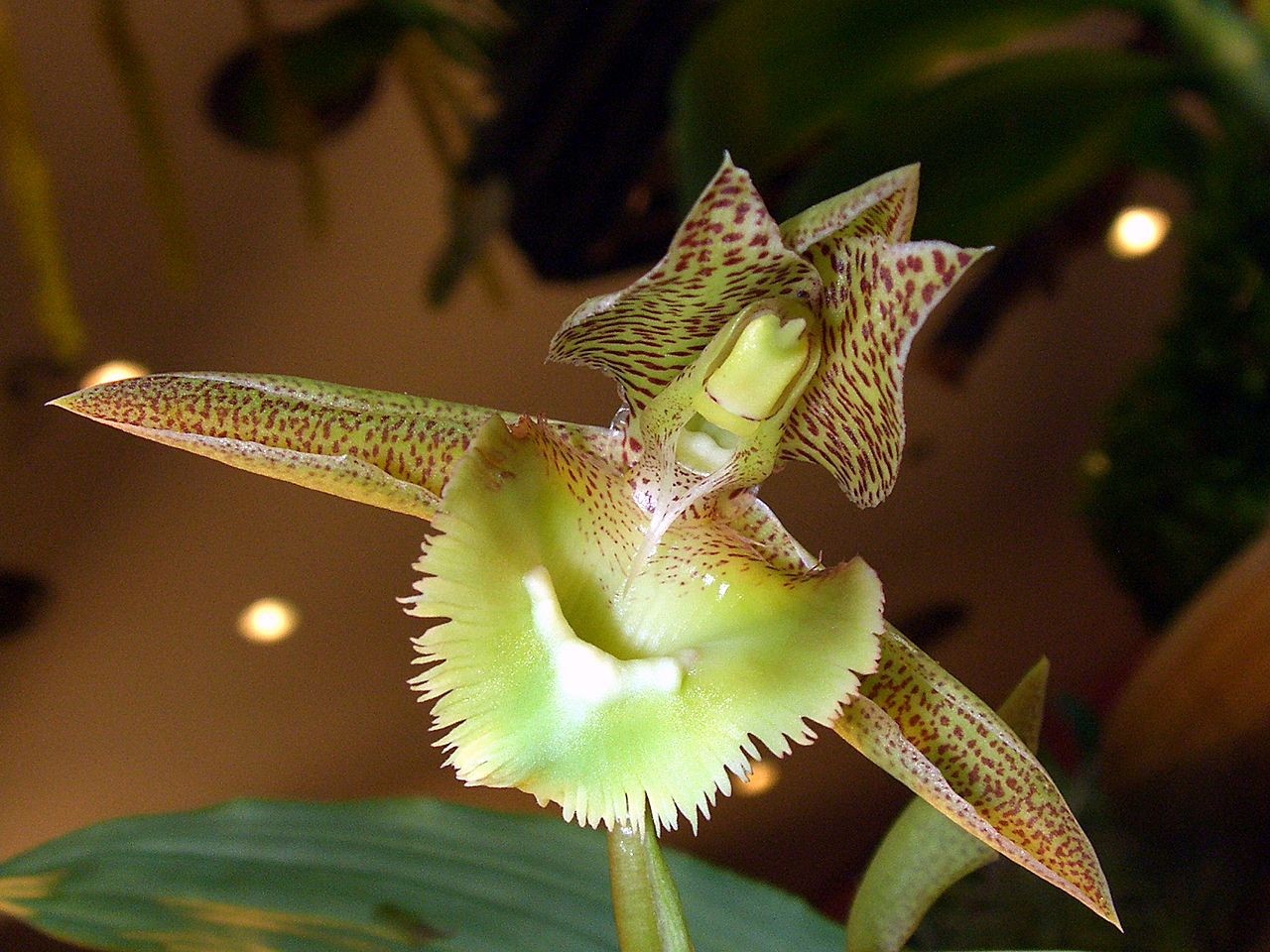
Catasetum fimbriatum

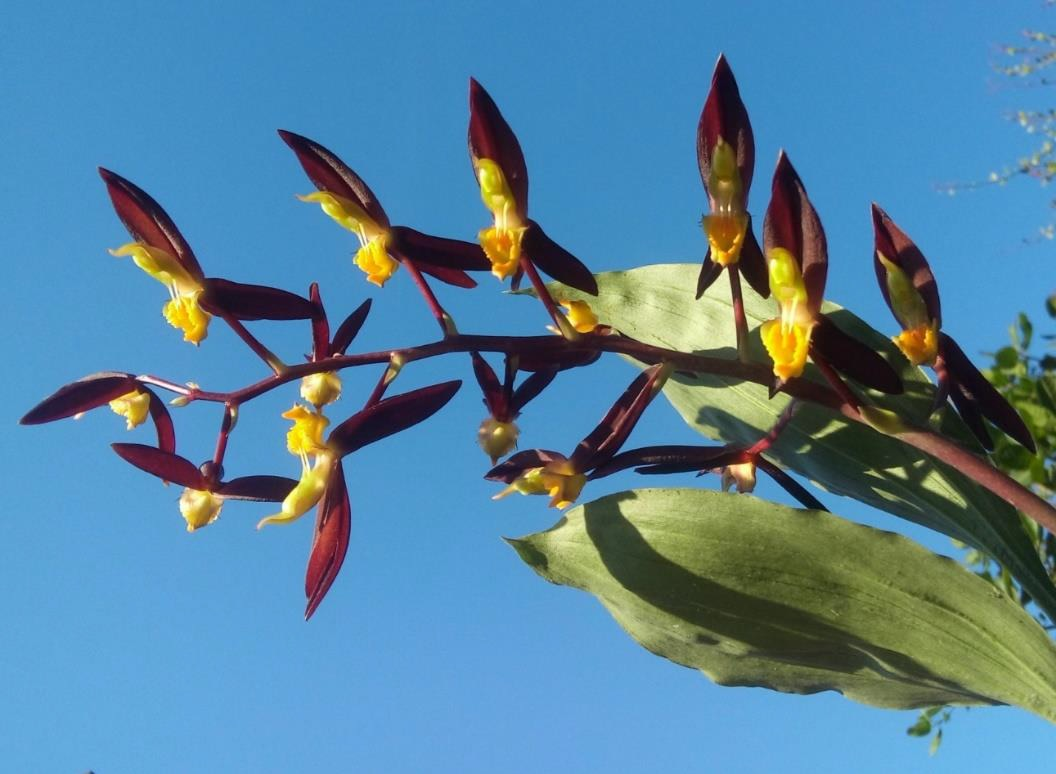
Catasetum lendarium

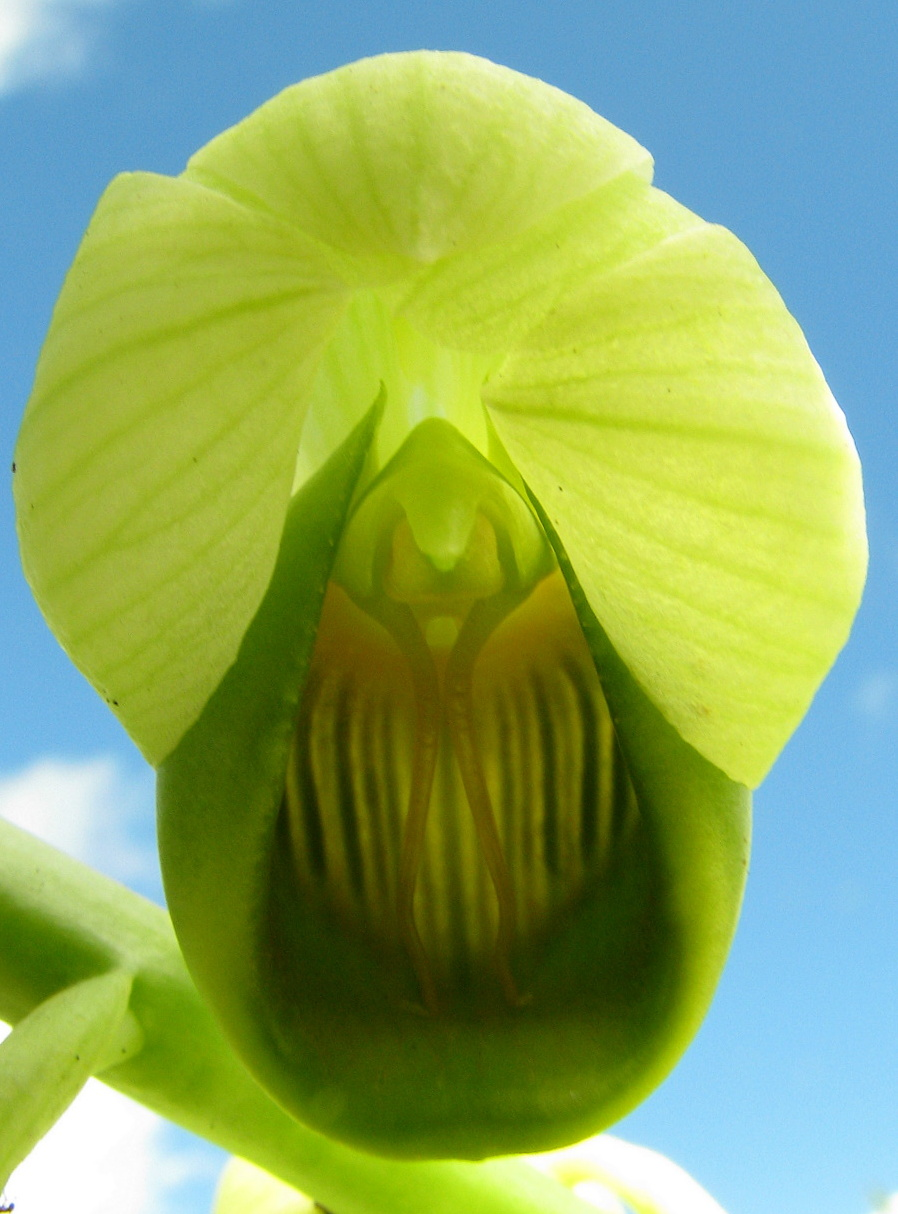
Catasetum luridum

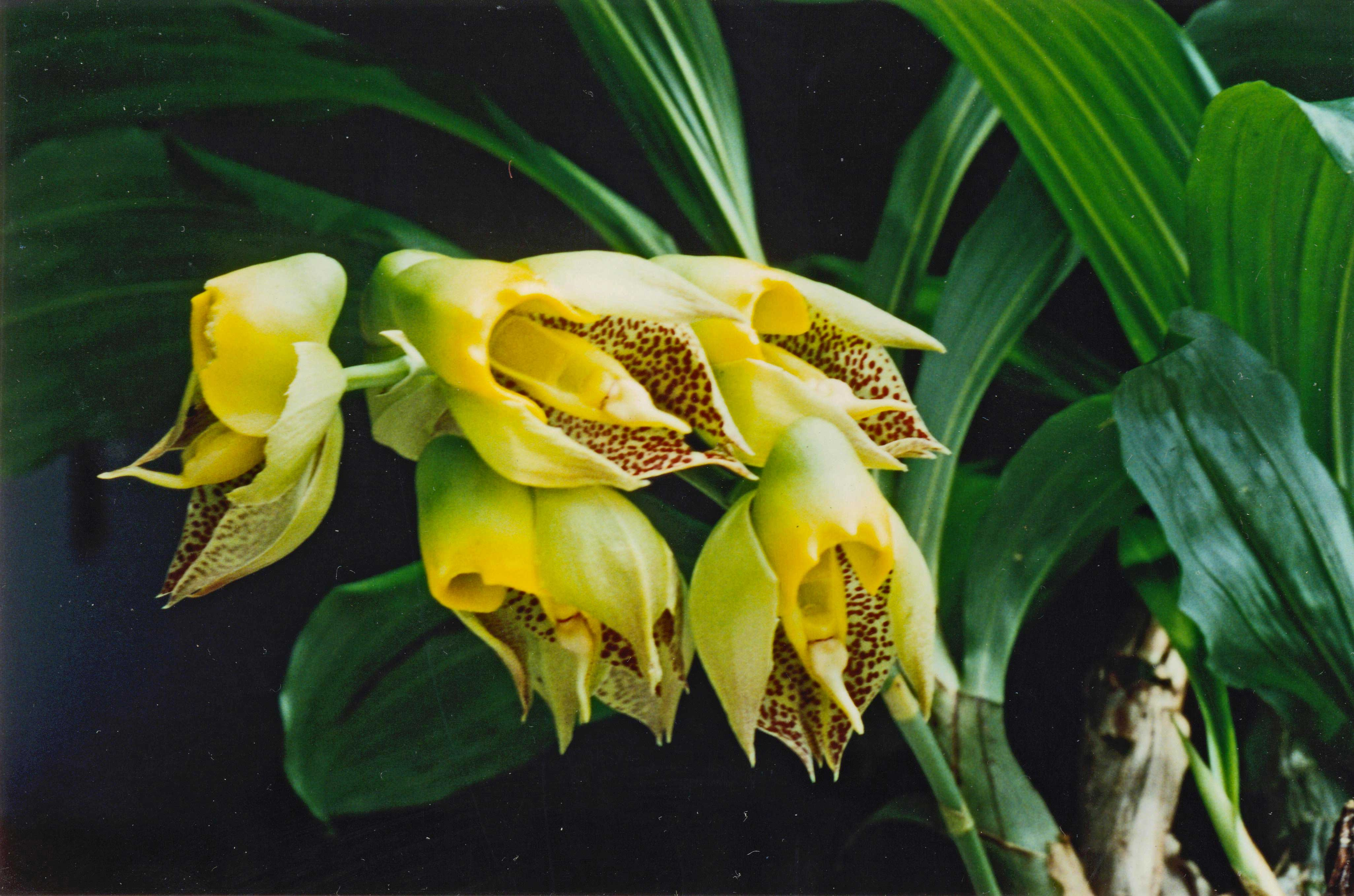
Catasetum macrocarpum

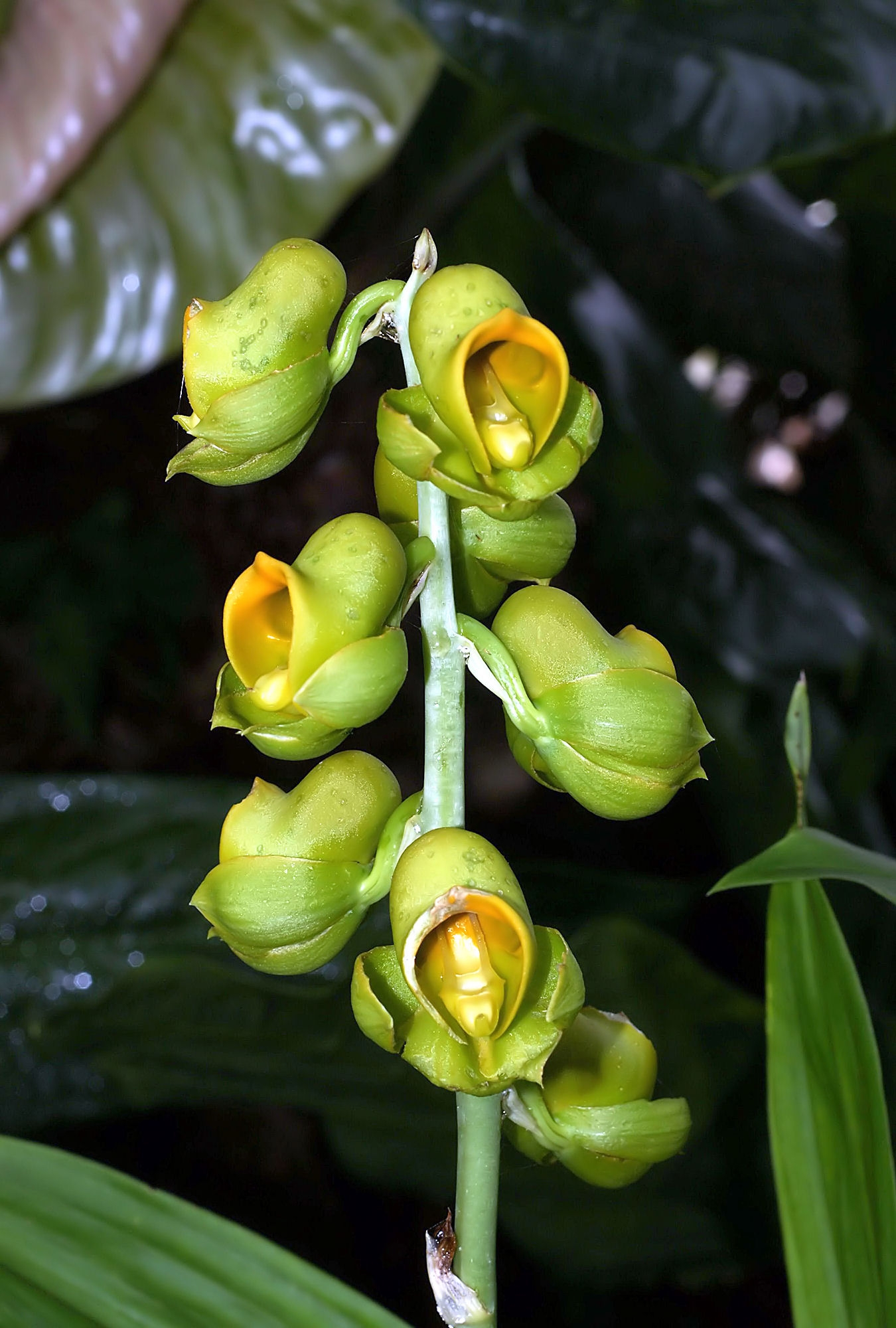
Catasetum macroglossum

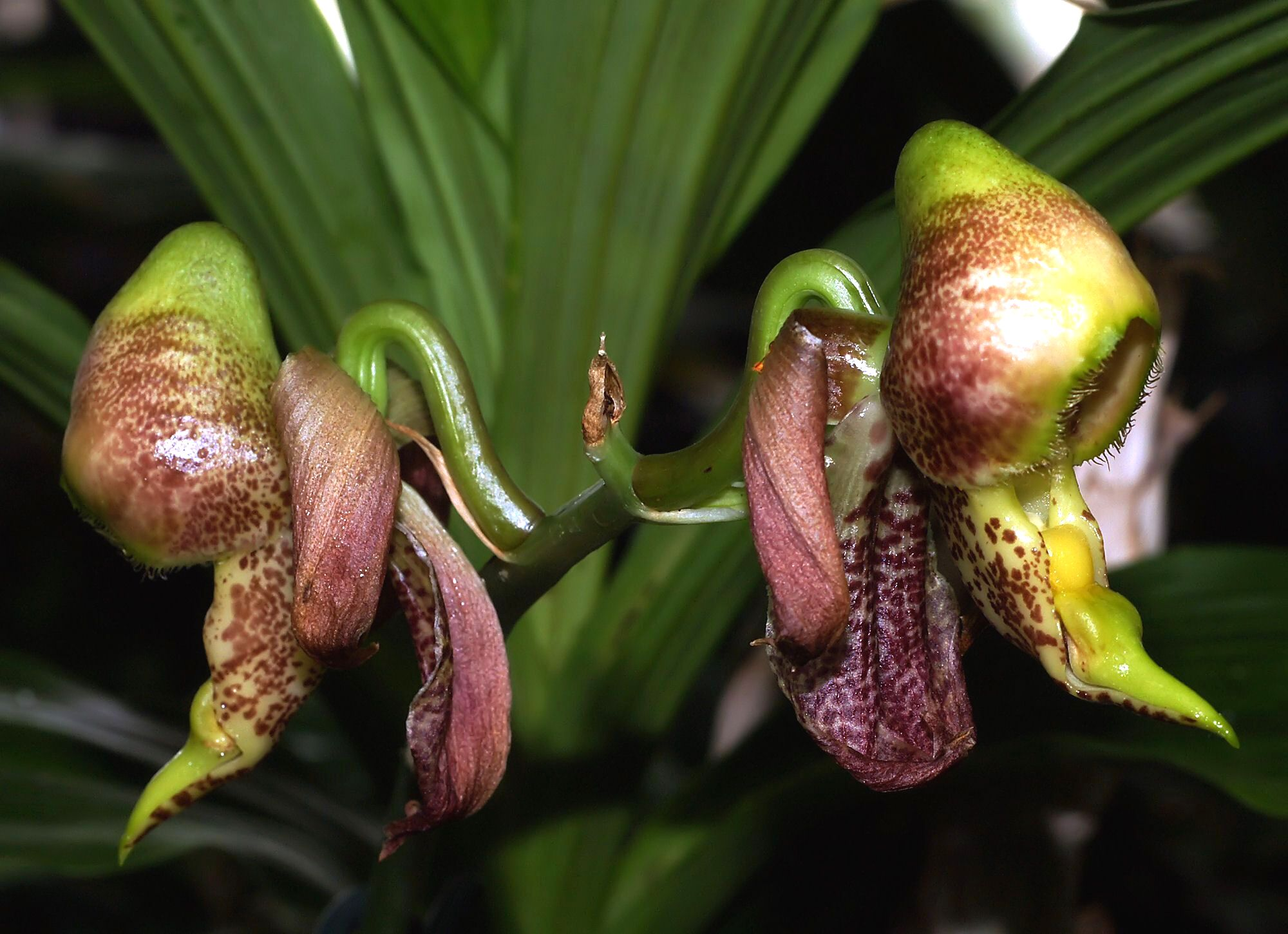
Catasetum maculatum

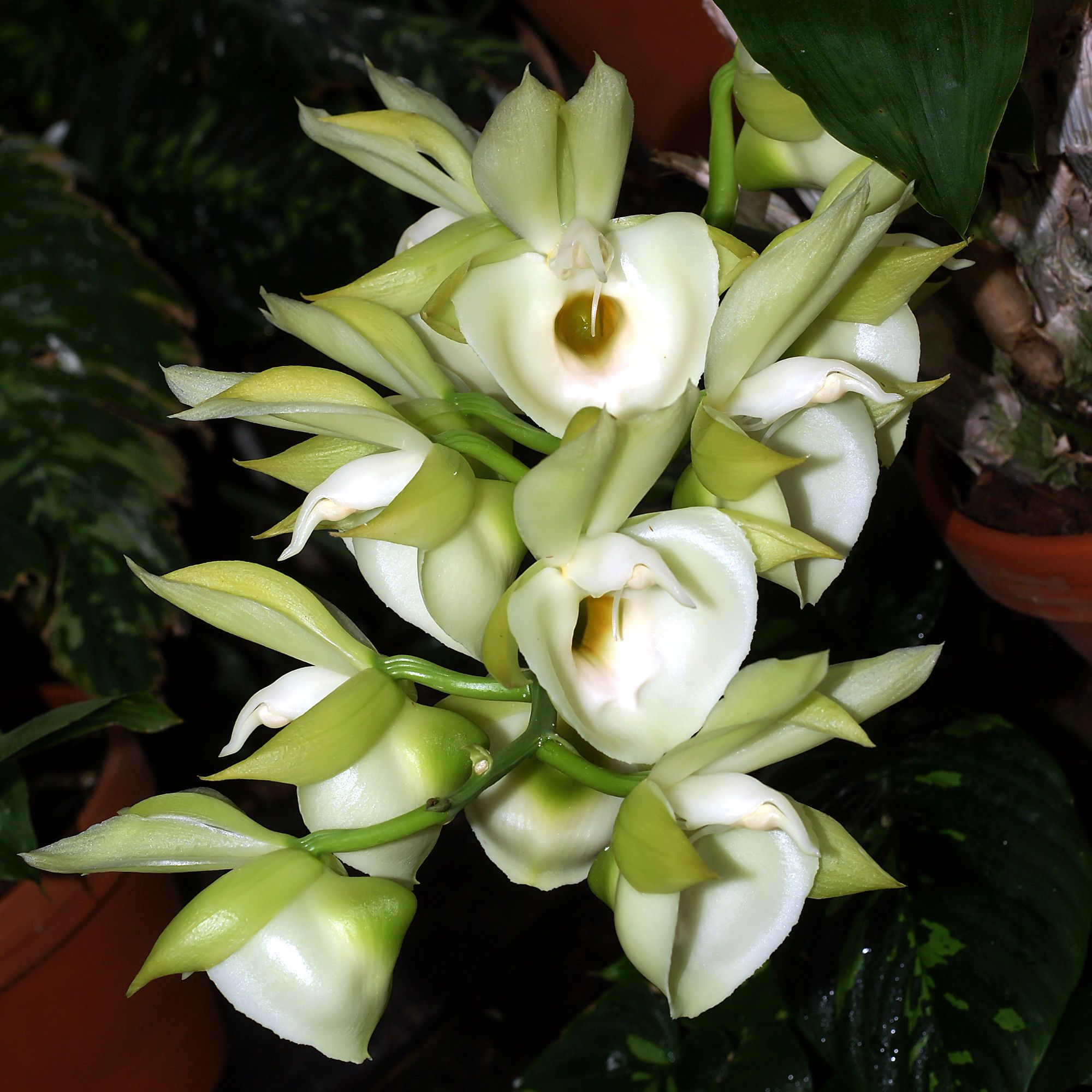
Catasetum pileatum

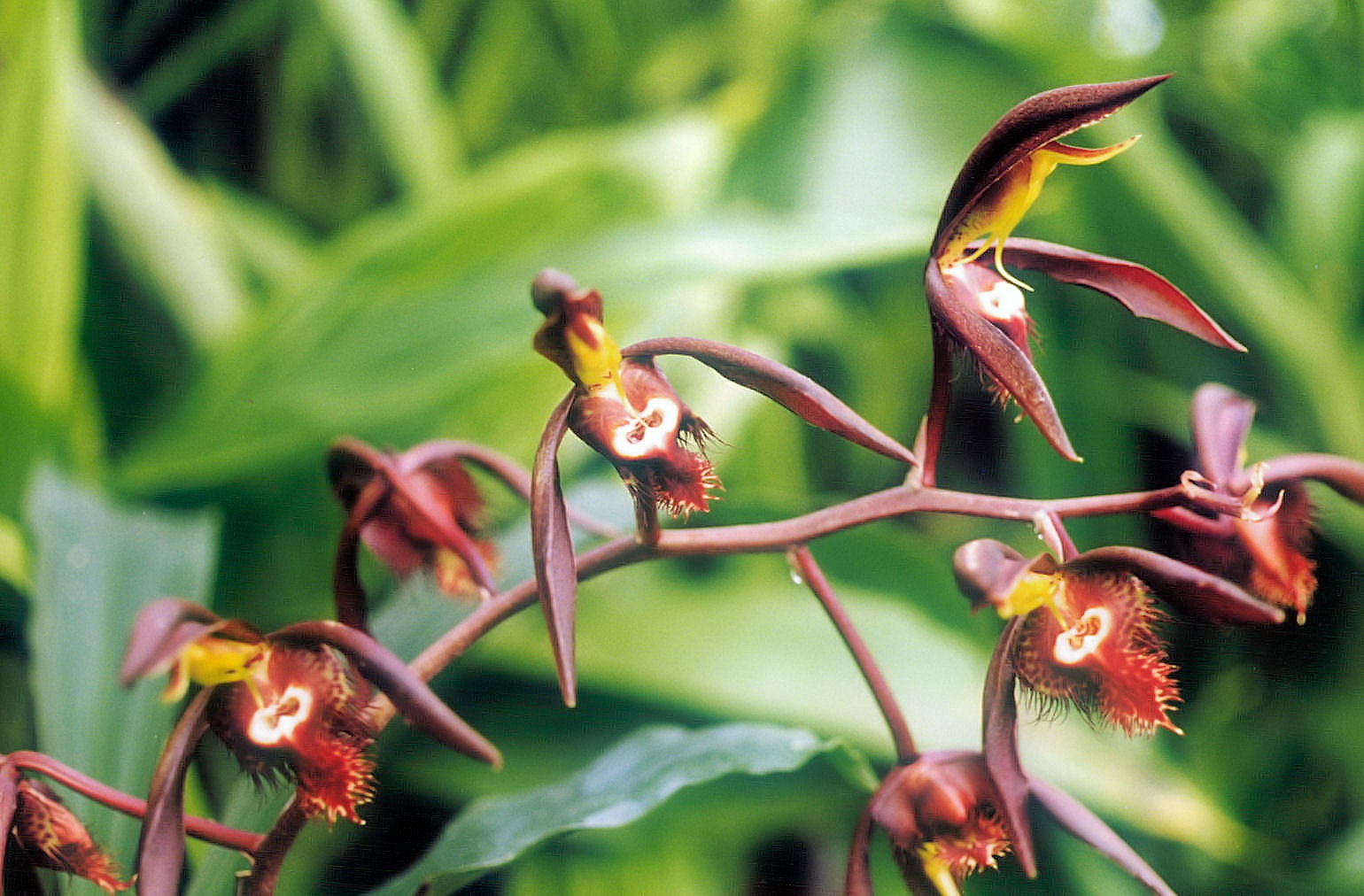
Catasetum saccatum

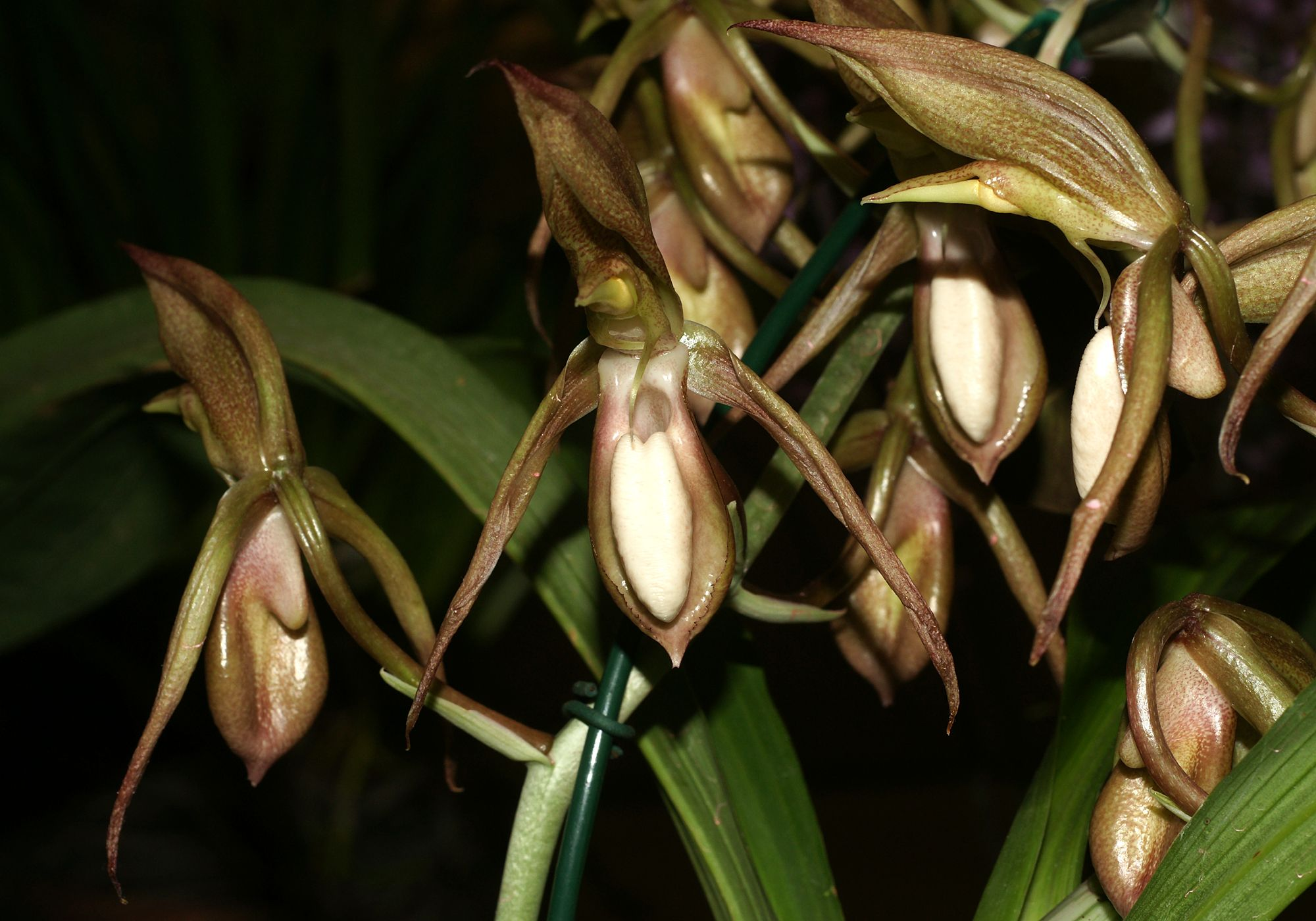
Catasetum tabulare

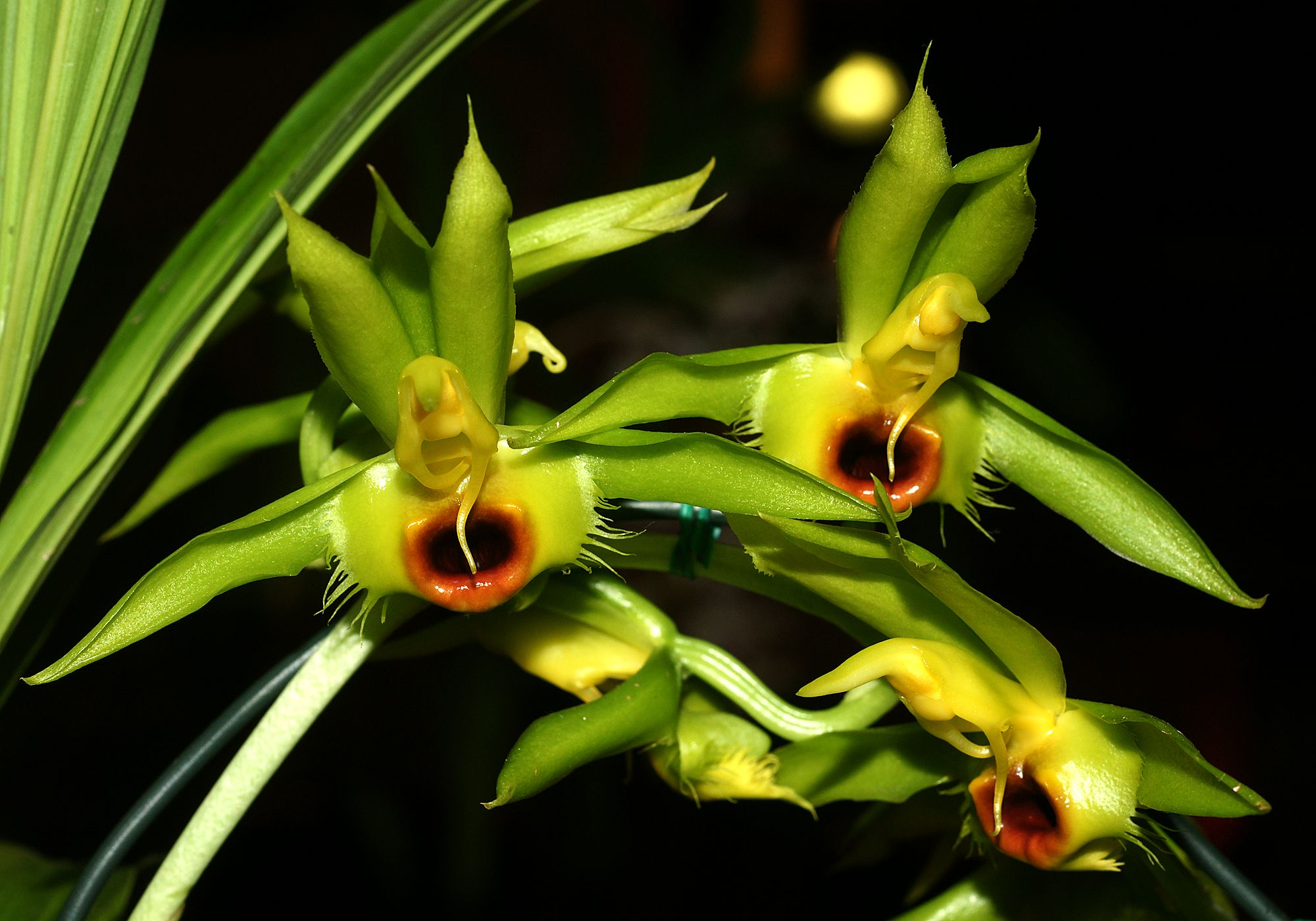
Catasetum osculatum

- Catasetum aculeatum (N. Brazil)
- Catasetum adremedium (Peru)
- Catasetum alatum (Brazil)
- Catasetum albovirens (Brazil)
- Catasetum albuquerquei (Brazil)
- Catasetum arachnoideum (N. Brazil).
- Catasetum arietinum (Brazil).
- Catasetum aripuanense (Brazil).
- Catasetum ariquemense (Brazil)
- Catasetum atratum : lustrous black catasetum (Brazil).
- Catasetum barbatum : bearded catasetum (Trinidad to S. Trop. America).
- Catasetum bergoldianum (Venezuela).
- Catasetum bicallosum (S. Venezuela).
- Catasetum bicolor : two-colored catasetum (Colombia to S. Venezuela)
- Catasetum bifidum (Brazil)
- Catasetum blackii (Brazil)
- Catasetum blepharochilum (Colombia).
- Catasetum boyi (Brazil ).
- Catasetum brichtae (Brazil) .
- Catasetum cabrutae (Venezuela).
- Catasetum callosum : callused catasetum (S. Trop. America).
- Catasetum carolinianum (Brazil).
- Catasetum carrenhianum (Brazil).
- Catasetum carunculatum (Peru).
- Catasetum cassideum (SE. Venezuela to N. Brazil).
- Catasetum caucanum (Colombia).
- Catasetum caxarariense (Brazil).
- Catasetum cernuum : nodding catasetum (Trinidad to Brazil).
- Catasetum charlesworthii (Venezuela).
- Catasetum cirrhaeoides : cirrhaea-like catasetum (Brazil).
- Catasetum cochabambanum (Bolivia).
- Catasetum collare (Venezuela to Ecuador and N. Brazil).
- Catasetum colossus (N. Brazil).
- Catasetum complanatum (NW. Brazil) .
- Catasetum confusum : confused catasetum (Brazil).
- Catasetum coniforme (Peru).
- Catasetum cotylicheilum (Peru).
- Catasetum crinitum (N. Brazil).
- Catasetum cristatum : comb-like catasetum (N. South America to N. Brazil).
- Catasetum cucullatum (Brazil).
- Catasetum decipiens (Venezuela).
- Catasetum deltoideum : triangular catasetum (Guianas).
- Catasetum denticulatum : small-toothed catasetum (Brazil).
- Catasetum discolor : differently colored catasetum (S. Trop. America).
- Catasetum dupliciscutula (Bolivia).
- Catasetum expansum : expansive catasetum (Ecuador).
- Catasetum fernandezii (Peru).
- Catasetum ferox (S. Venezuela to Brazil).
- Catasetum fimbriatum : fringed catasetum (S. Trop. America).
- Catasetum finetianum (Colombia).
- Catasetum franchinianum (Brazil).
- Catasetum fuchsii : Fuch's Catasetum (W. Bolivia to C. Brazil).
- Catasetum galeatum (Brazil).
- Catasetum galeritum (N. Brazil).
- Catasetum georgii (N. Brazil).
- Catasetum gladiatorium (Brazil)
- Catasetum globiflorum : spheroid-flowered catasetum (Brazil)
- Catasetum gnomus : gnome-like catasetum (S. Venezuela to N. Brazil)
- Catasetum gomezii (Venezuela).
- Catasetum hillsii (Peru.
- Catasetum hoehnei (Brazil)
- Catasetum hookeri (SW. Brazil)
- Catasetum incurvum : bent catasetum (Ecuador to Peru).
- Catasetum integerrimum : intact catasetum (Mexico to C. America).
- Catasetum interhomesianum (Bolivia).
- Catasetum japurense (N. Brazil).
- Catasetum jarae : Jara's catasetum (Peru).
- Catasetum juruenense : Rio Jurua catasetum (Brazil).
- Catasetum justinianum (Bolivia).
- Catasetum kempfii (Bolivia).
- Catasetum kleberianum : Kleber's catasetum (Brazil)
- Catasetum kraenzlinianum (N. Brazil).
- Catasetum laminatum : scaled catasetum (C. & SW. Mexico).
- Catasetum lanceatum (Brazil) .
- Catasetum lanxiforme (Peru).
- Catasetum lehmannii (Colombia)
- Catasetum lemosii (N. Brazil).
- Catasetum lendarium (N. Brazil).
- Catasetum lindleyanum (Colombia).
- Catasetum linguiferum (N. Brazil).
- Catasetum longifolium (N. South America to N. Brazil).
- Catasetum longipes (Brazil) .
- Catasetum lucis (Colombia).
- Catasetum luridum : pale-yellow catasetum (Guyana to E. Brazil).
- Catasetum macrocarpum : monkey goblet, monk's head orchid, large-fruited catasetum (Trinidad and Tobago to N. Argentina).
- Catasetum macroglossum : large-lipped catasetum (Ecuador.
- Catasetum maculatum : spotted catasetum (C. America to Venezuela).
- Catasetum maranhense (NE. Brazil).
- Catasetum maroaense (Venezuela).
- Catasetum matogrossense (Brazil)
- Catasetum meeae (N. Brazil).
- Catasetum mentosum (N. Brazil).
- Catasetum merchae (Venezuela).
- Catasetum micranthum (Brazil) .
- Catasetum microglossum (Ecuador to Peru).
- Catasetum mojuense (Brazil).
- Catasetum monodon (Brazil).
- Catasetum monzonense (Peru).
- Catasetum moorei : Moore's catasetum (Peru).
- Catasetum multifidum (Brazil).
- Catasetum multifissum (Peru).
- Catasetum nanayanum (Peru).
- Catasetum napoense (Ecuador to Peru).
- Catasetum naso : nose catasetum (Colombia to Venezuela).
- Catasetum ochraceum : ochre-yellow catasetum (Colombia).
- Catasetum ollare (N. Brazil).
- Catasetum ornithoides (N. Brazil).
- Catasetum osakadianum (Brazil).
- Catasetum osculatum (SW. Brazil) .
- Catasetum palmeirinhense (Brazil).
- Catasetum parguazense : Paraguaza River catasetum (Venezuela).
- Catasetum pendulum : pendant catasetum (W. Mexico).
- Catasetum peruvianum (Peru).
- Catasetum pileatum : mother of pearl flower, felt-capped catasetum (Trinidad to Ecuador).
- Catasetum planiceps (N. South America to Brazil).
- Catasetum platyglossum (Colombia).
- Catasetum pleidactylon (Peru).
- Catasetum poriferum (Guyana).
- Catasetum pulchrum (Brazil).
- Catasetum punctatum (Brazil).
- Catasetum purum : one-colored catasetum (Brazil)
- Catasetum purusense (Peru.)
- Catasetum pusillum (Peru)
- Catasetum randii (Brazil).
- Catasetum regnellii (Brazil).
- Catasetum reichenbachianum (N. Brazil).
- Catasetum richteri (Brazil)
- Catasetum ricii (Bolivia).
- Catasetum rigidum (Brazil).
- Catasetum rivularium (Brazil).
- Catasetum rohrii (S. Brazil).
- Catasetum rolfeanum (N. Brazil).
- Catasetum rondonense (Brazil)
- Catasetum rooseveltianum : Roosevelt's catasetum (Brazil)
- Catasetum saccatum : sack-shaped catasetum (Trop. S. America).
- Catasetum samaniegoi (Ecuador).
- Catasetum sanguineum : red catasetum (Colombia to Venezuela).
- Catasetum schmidtianum : Schmidt's catasetum (Brazil).
- Catasetum schunkei (Peru).
- Catasetum schweinfurthii (Peru.
- Catasetum seccoi (Brazil).
- Catasetum semicirculatum (Brazil).
- Catasetum socco ((SE. Brazil).
- Catasetum spitzii : Spitz's catasetum (Brazil).
- Catasetum splendens (Venezuela to N. Brazil).
- Catasetum stenoglossum (N. Brazil).
- Catasetum stevensonii (Ecuador to Peru).
- Catasetum tabulare : Table-like catasetum (Colombia).
- Catasetum taguariense (Brazil).
- Catasetum taquariense (WC. Brazil).
- Catasetum tenebrosum : dark-brown catasetum (Ecuador to Peru).
- Catasetum tenuiglossum (Peru).
- Catasetum thompsonii (Guyana).
- Catasetum tigrinum : tiger-striped catasetum (Brazil).
- Catasetum transversicallosum (Peru).
- Catasetum trautmannii (Peru).
- Catasetum tricolor (Guatemala).
- Catasetum tricorne (Colombia).
- Catasetum triodon (S. Brazil).
- Catasetum tuberculatum (Colombia to Peru).
- Catasetum tucuruiense (Brazil).
- Catasetum uncatum (Brazil) .
- Catasetum variabile (Brazil).
- Catasetum vinaceum (WC. Brazil).
- Catasetum viridiflavum : green-yellow catasetum (C. America).
- Catasetum yavitaense : yavita catasetum (Venezuela).

== Natural hybrids ==
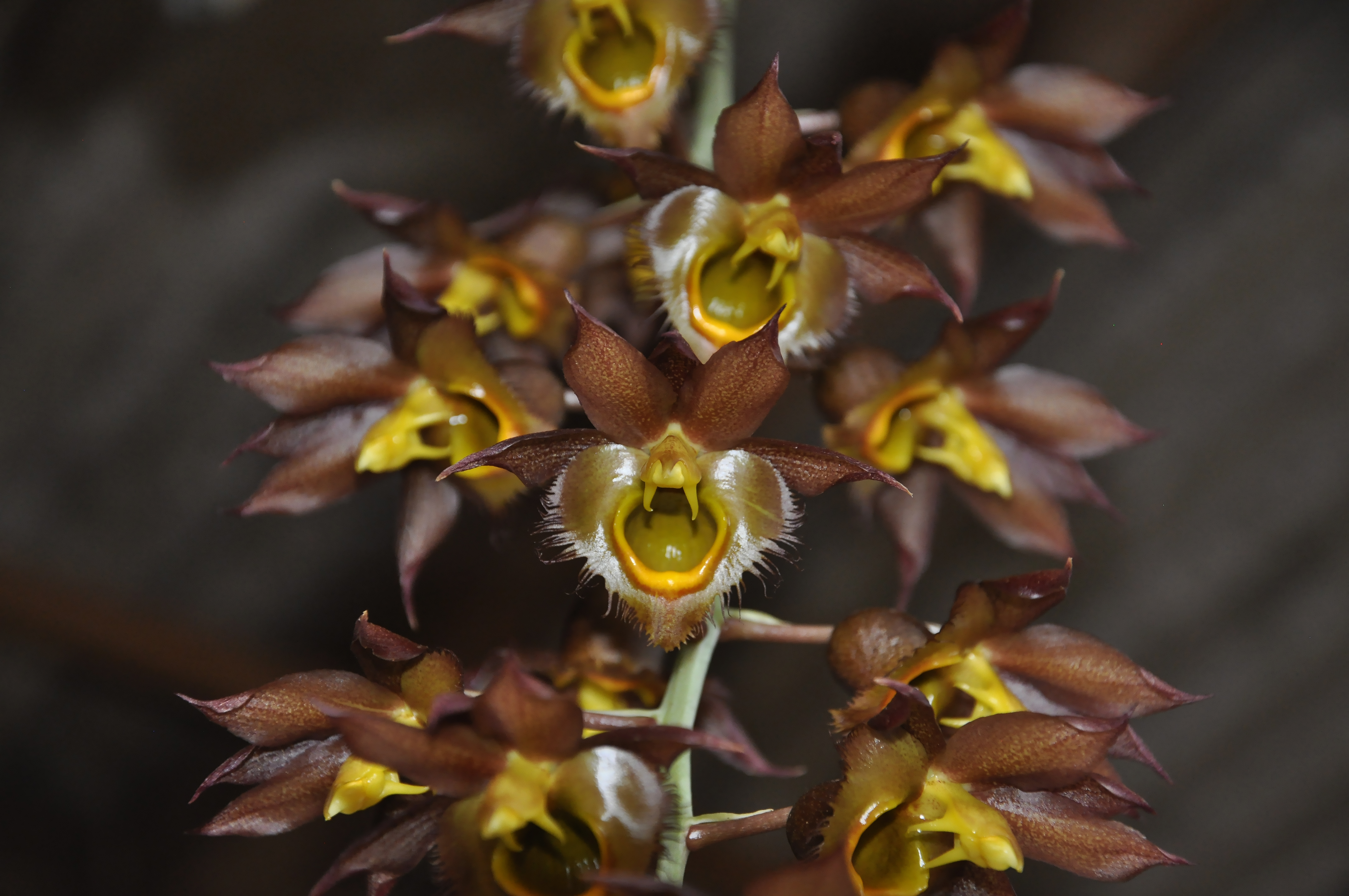
Catasetum x faustoi (=C. longifolium x C. osculatum)

- Catasetum × dunstervillei (= C. discolor × C. pileatum) (Venezuela).
- Catasetum × guianense (= C. longifolium × C. macrocarpum) (Guianas).
- Catasetum × intermedium (Brazil).
- Catasetum × issanensis(= C. longifolium × C. pileatum) (Brazil).
- Catasetum × pohlianum(= C. hookeri × C. trulla) (Brazil)
- Catasetum × roseoalbum (Guianas).
- Catasetum × sodiroi (= C. expansum × C.macroglossum) (Ecuador).
- Catasetum × tapiriceps (N. Brazil).
- Catasetum × violascens : Purple Catasetum (W. South America).
- Catasetum × wendlingeri (Venezuela to Guyana).

== Hybrid gallery ==
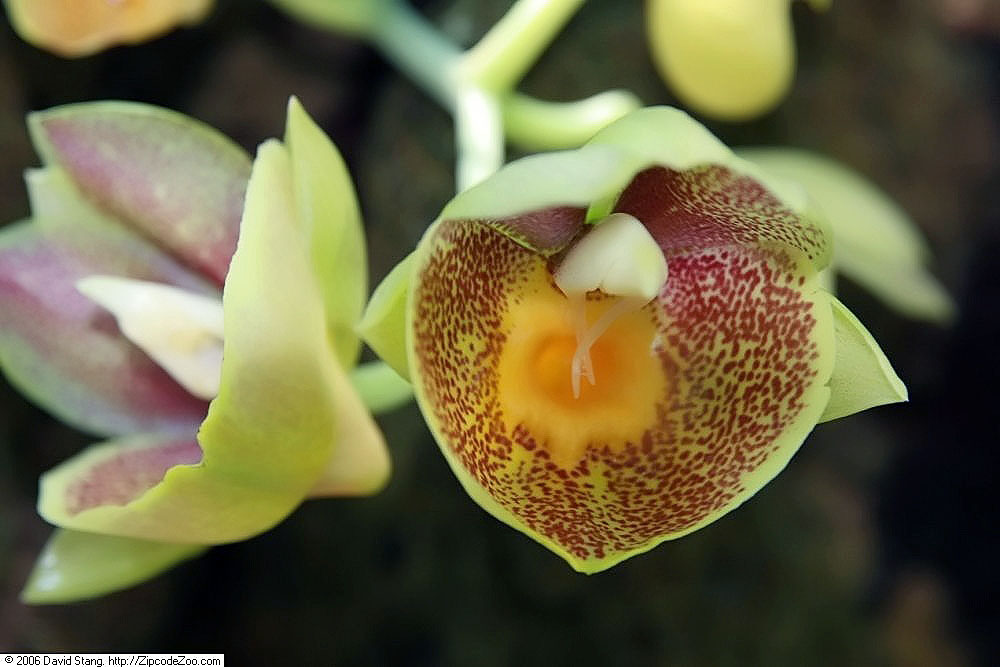
Catasetum Orchidglade II

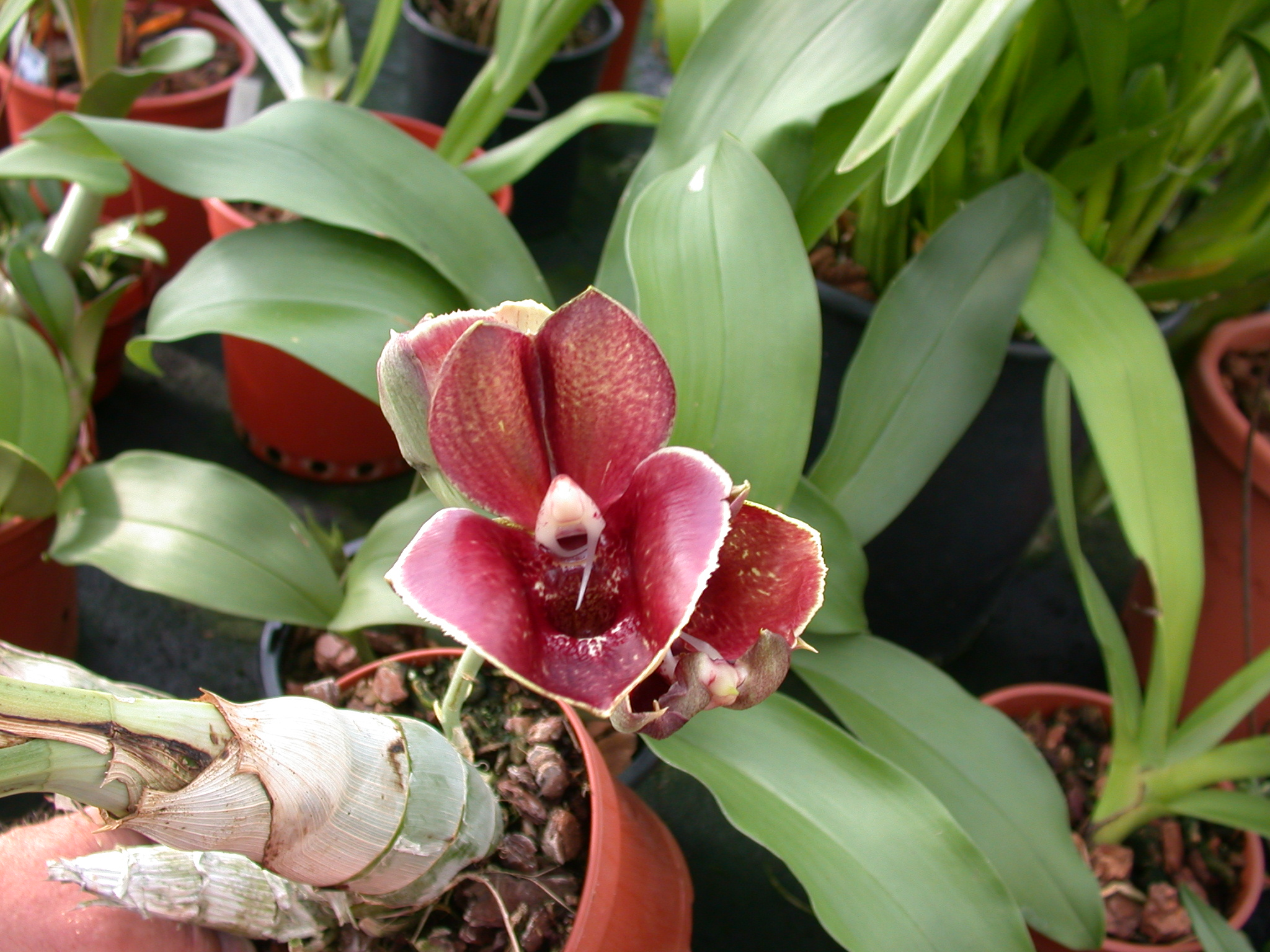
Catasetum Orchidglade 'Jack of Diamond'

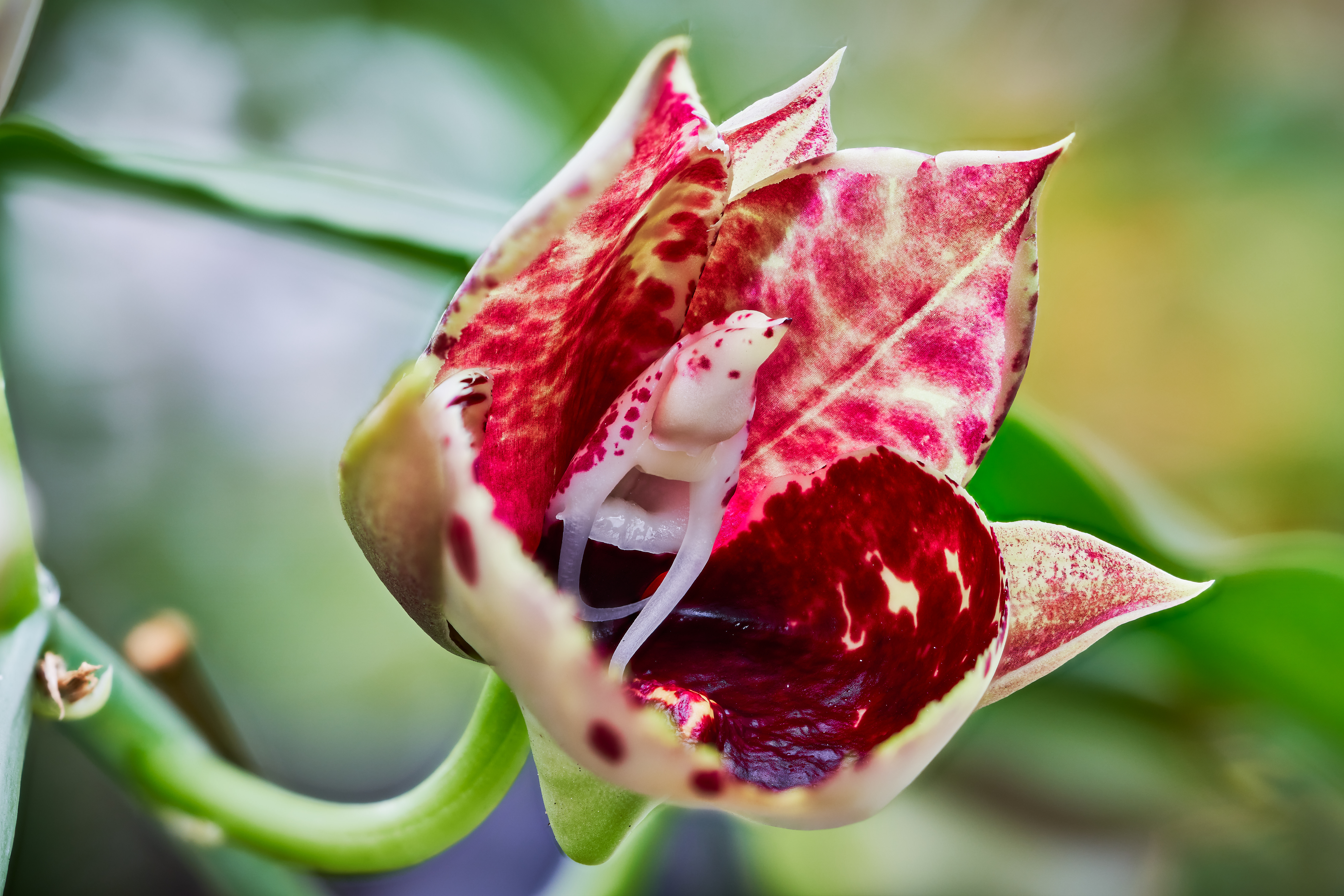
Catasetum Susan Fuchs 'Sun Face'

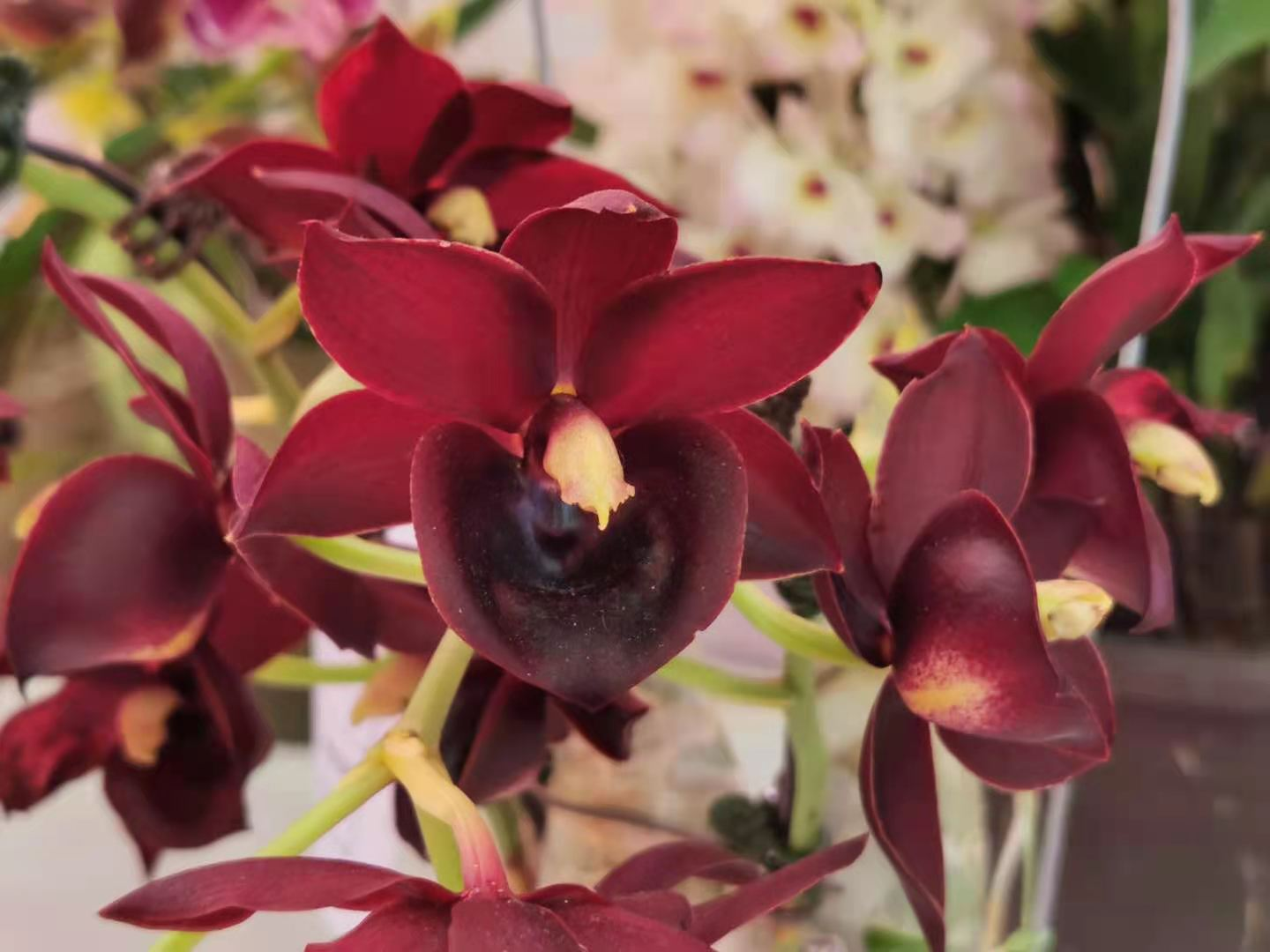
Catanoches Taiwan Red Diamond

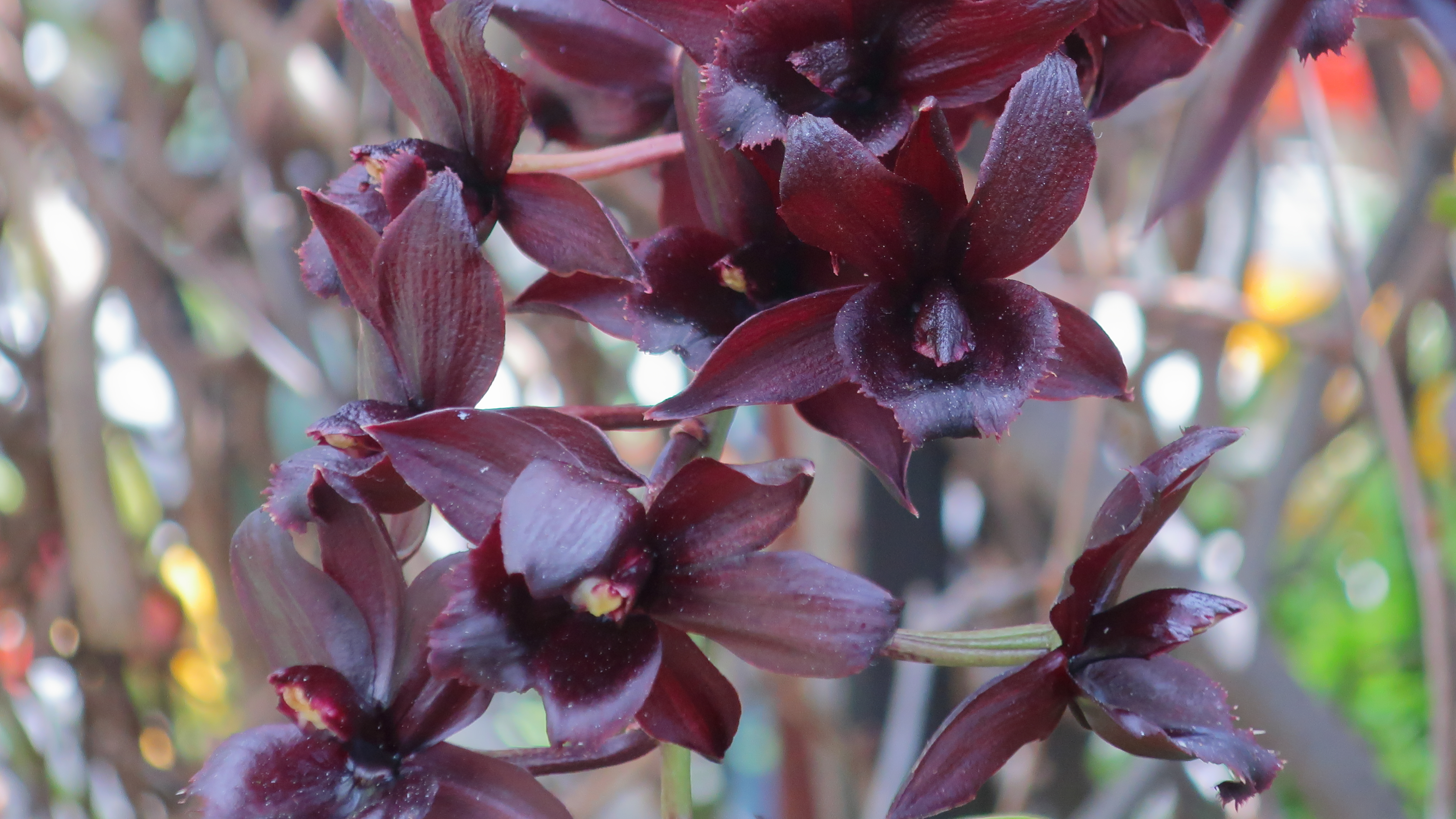
Fredclarkeara After Dark 'SVO Black Pearl'

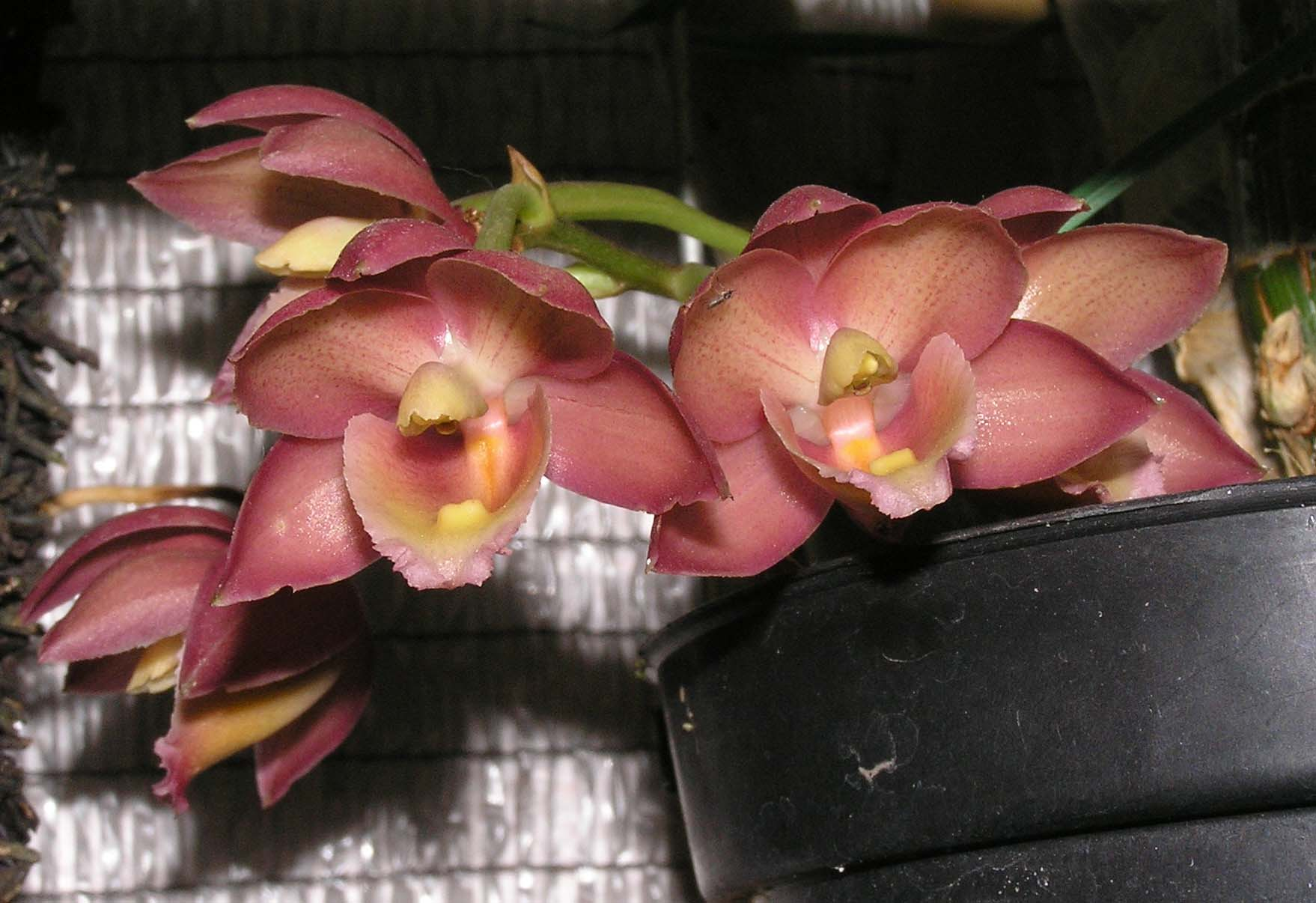
Catamodes
