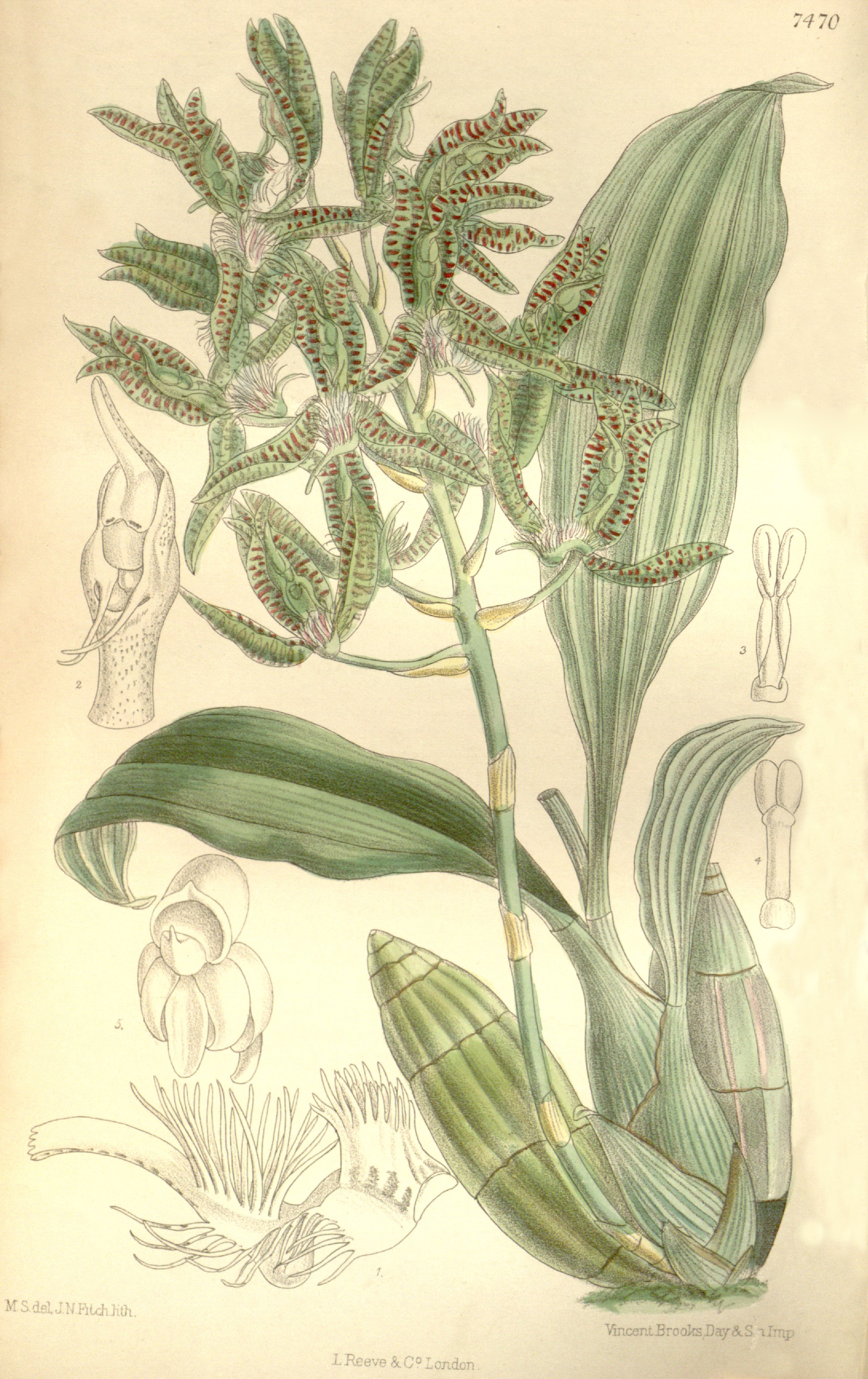

Scientific classification
- Kingdom: Plantae
- Clade: Tracheophytes
- Clade: Angiosperms
- Clade: Monocots
- Order: Asparagales
- Family: Orchidaceae
- Subfamily: Epidendroideae
- Genus: Catasetum
- Species: C. randii

Binomial name
- Catasetum randii Rolfe (1894)

= Catasetum randii =

Species of orchid

Catasetum randii is a species of orchid found in Brazil.
