= Catasetum atratum =

Scientific classification
- Kingdom: Plantae
- Clade: Tracheophytes
- Clade: Angiosperms
- Clade: Monocots
- Order: Asparagales
- Family: Orchidaceae
- Subfamily: Epidendroideae
- Genus: Catasetum
- Species: C. atratum

Binomial name
- Catasetum atratum Lindl. (1838)

Synonyms
- Catasetum pallidum Klotzsch (1855)

Species of orchid from Brazil

Catasetum atratum, the lustrous black catasetum, is a species of orchid found in Brazil.
