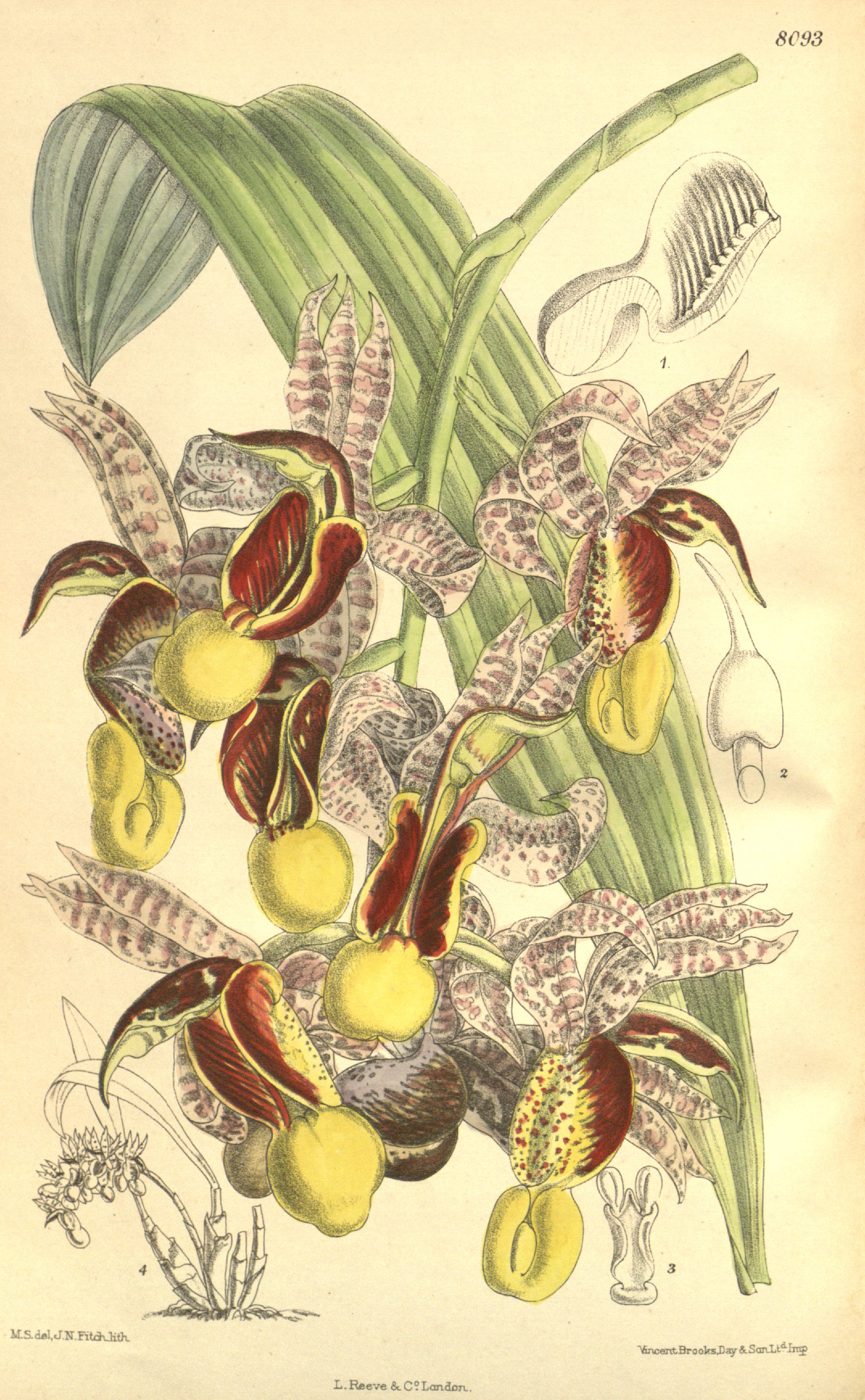

Scientific classification
- Kingdom: Plantae
- Clade: Tracheophytes
- Clade: Angiosperms
- Clade: Monocots
- Order: Asparagales
- Family: Orchidaceae
- Subfamily: Epidendroideae
- Genus: Catasetum
- Species: C. galeritum

Binomial name
- Catasetum galeritum Rchb.f. (1886)

Synonyms
- Catasetum galeritum var. pachyglossum Rchb.f. (1889)

= Catasetum galeritum =

Species of orchid

Catasetum galeritum is a species of orchid found in North Brazil.
