= Catasetum hookeri =

Scientific classification
- Kingdom: Plantae
- Clade: Tracheophytes
- Clade: Angiosperms
- Clade: Monocots
- Order: Asparagales
- Family: Orchidaceae
- Subfamily: Epidendroideae
- Genus: Catasetum
- Species: C. hookeri

Binomial name
- Catasetum hookeri Lindl.
- The distribution of the Catasetum hookeri

Synonyms
- Catasetum imschootianum L.Linden & Cogn.; Catasetum milleri Lodd. ex Lindl.; Catasetum triste Rchb.f.

Species of orchid

Catasetum hookeri, Hooker's catasetum, is an epiphytic pseudobulbeous species of orchid endemic to Brazil.

== Description ==
Catasetum hookeri blooms in spring and summer on a basal, 18 cm (7.1 in) long, up to 9 flowered inflorescence arising on a newly matured pseudobulb carrying the flowers in an apical cluster at the apex of its inflorescence spike. Its petals are light green heavily covered with reddish-brown spots, the lip (labellum) is light green outside, a dark reddish-brown color inside, with some yellow patches, the column is pale green at the apex with reddish-brown spots on the rest of it, while the antennae is green with some small spots.

== Care ==
Catasetum hookeri is a sun loving plant that needs a light level of around 45000 lux and around 70% shade. It also goes into a leaf-drop state during winter like other Catasetum species.

== Distribution ==
Catasetum hookeri is found in Southeastern Brazil, specifically the states of Minas Gerais, São Paulo, Rio de Janeiro, and Espíritu Santo. It typically grows in shady forests from sea level to about 1000 meters. Their climate is tropical to subtropical, with dry, almost desert-like conditions.

== Taxonomy and etymology ==
Catasetum hookeri's valid name and formal description was published in The Botanical Register. The species was named after William Jackson Hooker, an english botanist, systematic taxonomist, and botanical illustrator who was also Lindley's colleague.
