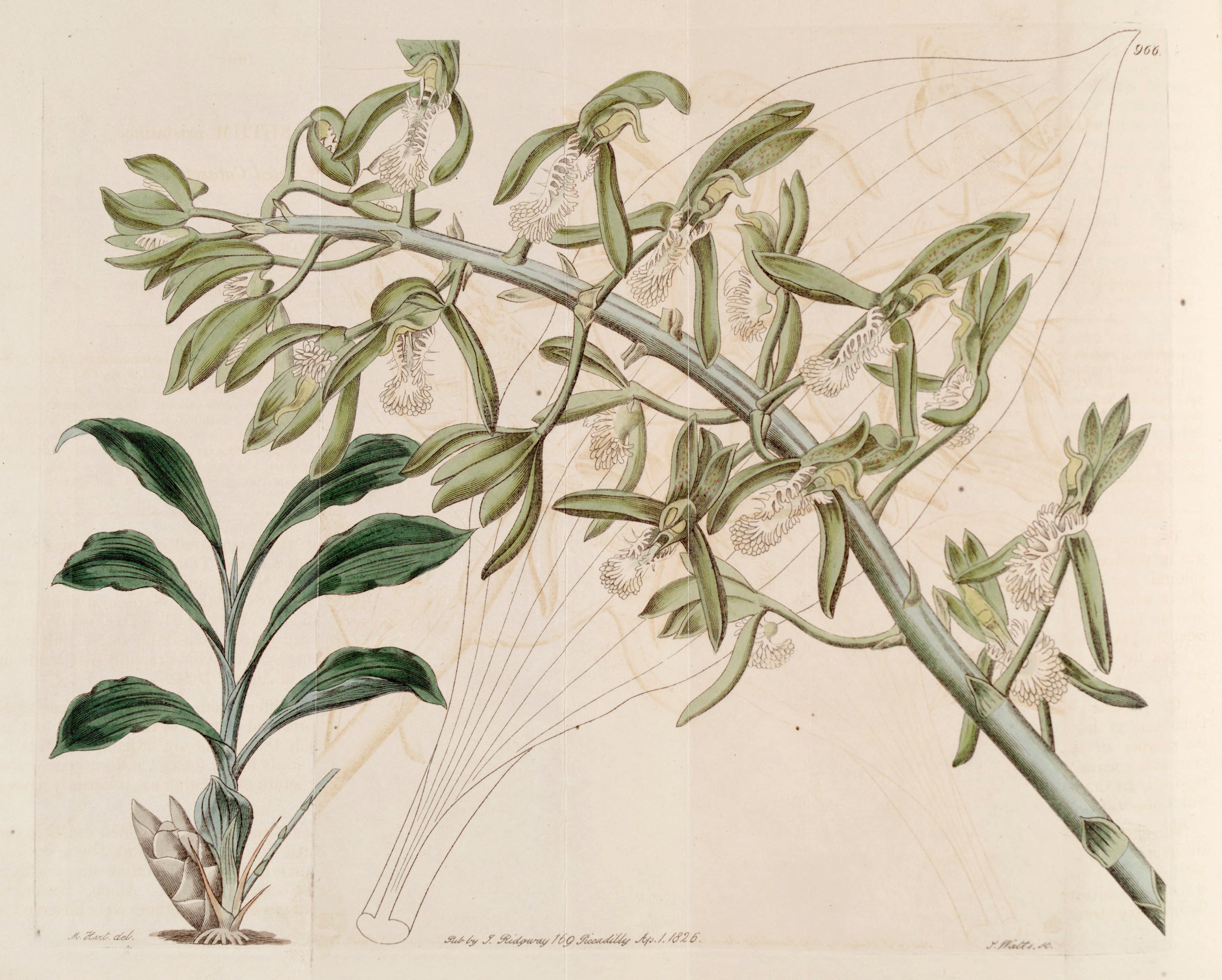

Scientific classification
- Kingdom: Plantae
- Clade: Tracheophytes
- Clade: Angiosperms
- Clade: Monocots
- Order: Asparagales
- Family: Orchidaceae
- Subfamily: Epidendroideae
- Genus: Catasetum
- Species: C. cristatum

Binomial name
- Catasetum cristatum Lindl. (1826)

Synonyms
- Catasetum cornutum Lindl. (1840); Catasetum cristatum var. stenosepalum Rchb.f. (1887)

= Catasetum cristatum =

Species of neotropical orchid

Catasetum cristatum, the comb-like catasetum, is a species of orchid found from North South America to North Brazil, first formally described in 1824.

A few taxons were described for cristatum.
