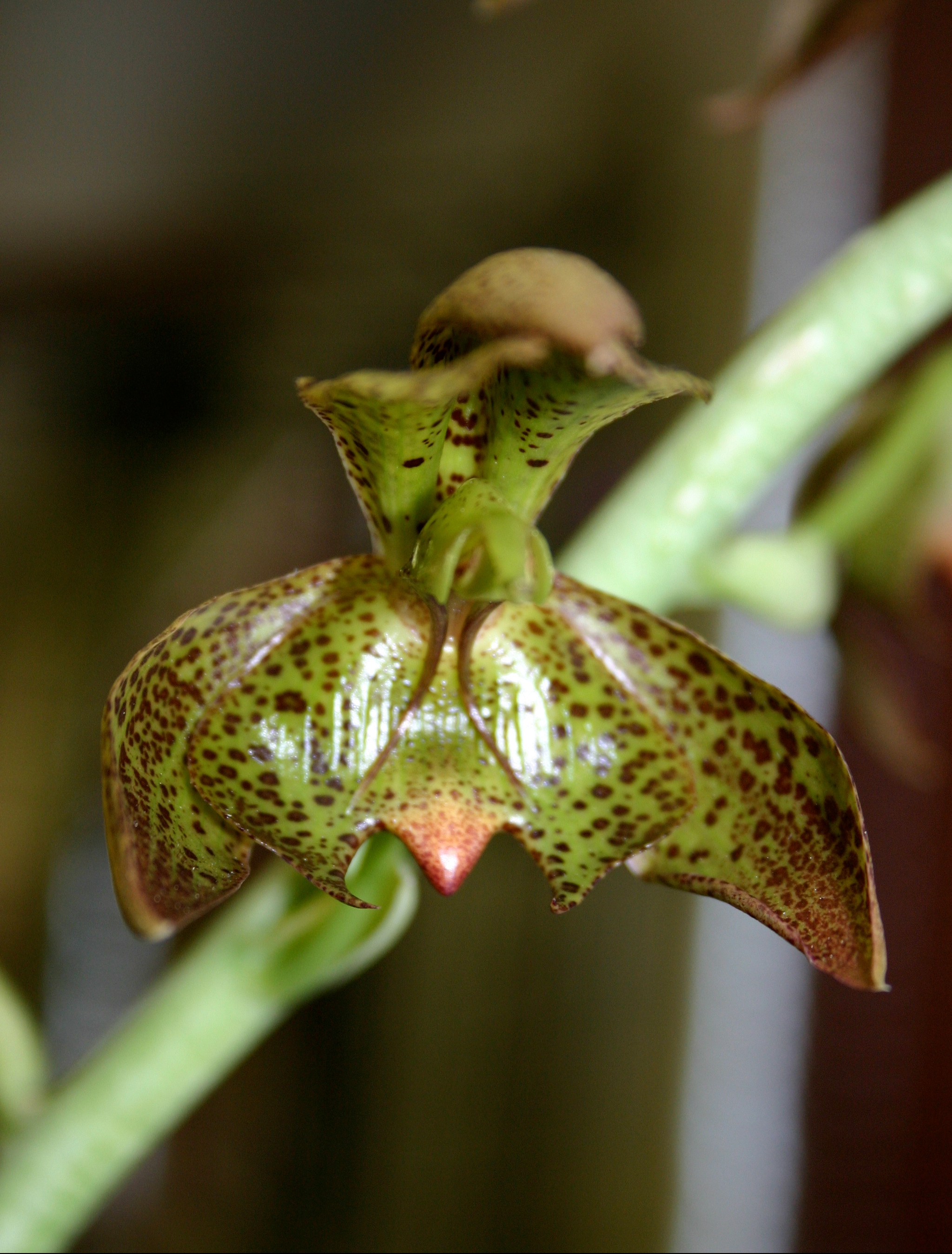

Scientific classification
- Kingdom: Plantae
- Clade: Tracheophytes
- Clade: Angiosperms
- Clade: Monocots
- Order: Asparagales
- Family: Orchidaceae
- Subfamily: Epidendroideae
- Genus: Catasetum
- Species: C. cernuum

Binomial name
- Catasetum cernuum (Lindl.) Rchb.f. (1863)

Synonyms
- Myanthus cernuus Lindl. (1832) (Basionym); Monachanthus viridis Lindl. (1832); Catasetum trifidum Hook. (1833); Catasetum viride (Lindl.) Lindl. (1841); Catasetum umbrosum Barb.Rodr. (1877); Catasetum cernuum var. umbrosum (Barb.Rodr.) Cogn. (1902); Catasetum cernuum var. revolutum Cogn. (1906); Catasetum cernuum var. typum Hoehne (1942)

= Catasetum cernuum =

Species of neotropical orchid

Catasetum cernuum, the nodding catasetum, is a species of orchid found from Trinidad to Brazil.
