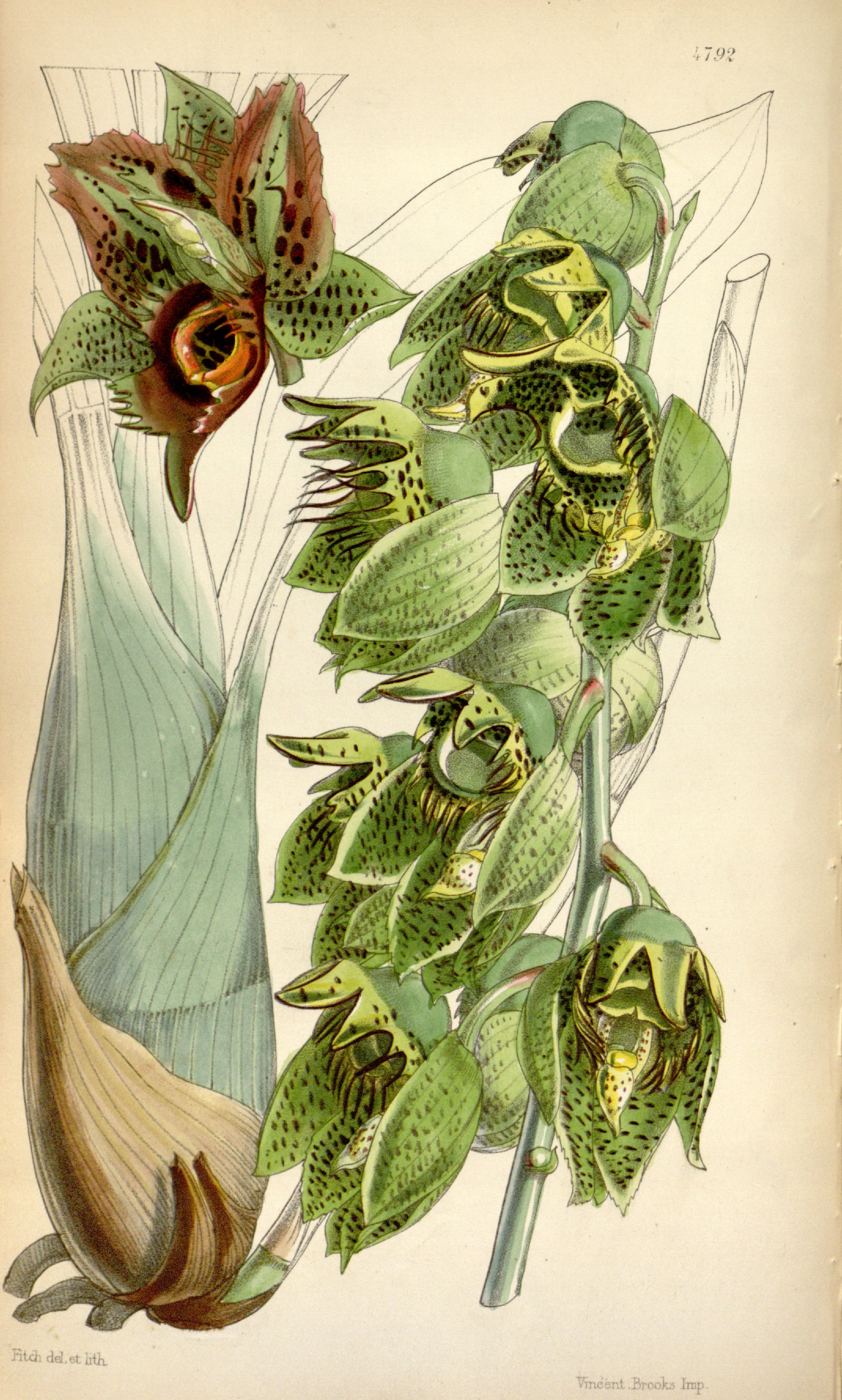

Scientific classification
- Kingdom: Plantae
- Clade: Tracheophytes
- Clade: Angiosperms
- Clade: Monocots
- Order: Asparagales
- Family: Orchidaceae
- Subfamily: Epidendroideae
- Genus: Catasetum
- Species: C. naso

Binomial name
- Catasetum naso Lindl. (1843)

Synonyms
- Catasetum naso var. pictum T. Moore (1857)

= Catasetum naso =

Species of orchid

Catasetum naso, the nose catasetum, is a species of orchid found from Colombia to Venezuela.
