= Catasetum planiceps =

Scientific classification
- Kingdom: Plantae
- Clade: Tracheophytes
- Clade: Angiosperms
- Clade: Monocots
- Order: Asparagales
- Family: Orchidaceae
- Subfamily: Epidendroideae
- Genus: Catasetum
- Species: C. planiceps

Binomial name
- Catasetum planiceps Lindl. (1843)

Synonyms
- Catasetum hymenophorum Cogn. (1895)

Species of orchid

Catasetum planiceps is a species of orchid found from North South America to Brazil.
