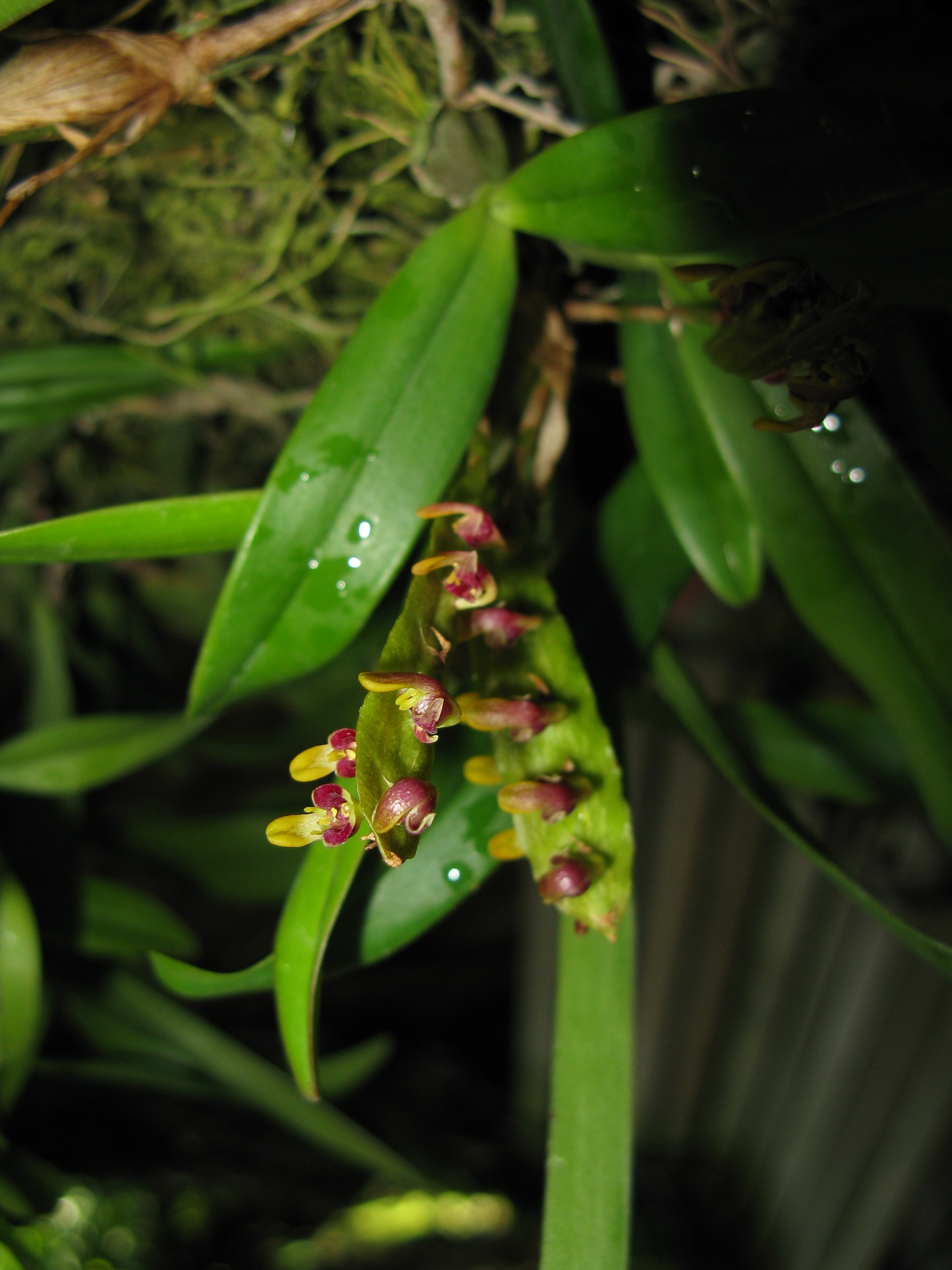
- Bulbophyllum falcatum var. velutinum

Scientific classification
- Kingdom: Plantae
- Clade: Tracheophytes
- Clade: Angiosperms
- Clade: Monocots
- Order: Asparagales
- Family: Orchidaceae
- Subfamily: Epidendroideae
- Genus: Bulbophyllum
- Section: Bulbophyllum sect. Megaclinium; G.A. Fischer & J.J. Verm. ex J.J. Verm.

Type species
- Bulbophyllum falcatum (Lindl.) Rchb. f.

Species
- See text

Synonyms
- Megaclinium Lindl. 1826

= Bulbophyllum sect. Megaclinium =

Section of flowering plants

Bulbophyllum sect. Megaclinium is a section of the genus Bulbophyllum.

== Description ==
Species in this section have a creeping rhizome and 4 pollina.

== Distribution ==
Plants from this section are found in Africa.

== Species ==
Bulbophyllum section Megaclinium comprises the following species:

Image	Name	Distribution	Elevation (m)
	Bulbophyllum calyptratum Kraenzl. 1895	Ghana, Guinea, Ivory Coast, Liberia, Nigeria, Sierra Leone, Togo, Cameroon, Congo, Equatorial Guinea, Gabon and Zaire	1,000 metres (3,300 ft)
	Bulbophyllum carnosilabium Summerh. 1953 publ. 1954	Cameroon, Gabon and Zaire	850 metres (2,790 ft)
	Bulbophyllum colubrinum (Rchb.f.) Rchb.f. 1861	Ghana, Ivory Coast, Nigeria, Sierra Leone, Cameroon, Congo, Gabon, Zaire and Angola	100–1,000 metres (330–3,280 ft)
	Bulbophyllum curvimentatum J.J.Verm. 1984	Equatorial Guinea, Bioko and Sao Tome	1,000 metres (3,300 ft)
	Bulbophyllum dolabriforme J.J.Verm. 1987	northwestern Nigeria	
	Bulbophyllum falcatum [Lindley]Rchb.f 1861	Sierra Leone, Ghana, Ivory Coast, Guinea, Liberia, Nigeria, Cameroon, Central African Republic, Gabon, Zaire and Uganda	0–1,800 metres (0–5,906 ft)
	Bulbophyllum falcipetalum Lindl., 1862	Ghana, Ivory Coast, Nigeria, Sierra Leone, Gabon, Cameroon and Gabon	
	Bulbophyllum fayi J.J.Verm. 1992	Central African Republic, Cameroon and Gabon	0–800 metres (0–2,625 ft)
	Bulbophyllum imbricatum Lindl. 1841	Sierra Leone, Ivory Coast, Liberia, Nigeria, Guinea, Equatorial Guinea, Gulf of Guinea Islands, Gabon, Cameroon, Central African Republic, Congo and Zaire	0–1,000 metres (0–3,281 ft)
	Bulbophyllum injoloense De Wild. 1916	Zaire and Zambia	0–1,000 metres (0–3,281 ft)
	Bulbophyllum lizae J.J.Verm. 1984	São Tomé Island	1,350–1,400 metres (4,430–4,590 ft)
	Bulbophyllum luciphilum Stevart 2000	São Tomé Island	1,000 metres (3,300 ft)
	Bulbophyllum magnibracteatum Summerh. 1935	Ghana, Ivory Coast, Liberia, Nigeria, Equatorial Guinea, Gabon and Zaire	0–800 metres (0–2,625 ft)
	Bulbophyllum maximum (Lindl.) Rchb. f. 1861	Sierra Leone, Ivory Coast, Ghana, togo, Liberia, Nigeria, Gabon, Gulf of Guinea Islands, Cameroon, Central African Republic, Zaire, Uganda, Kenya, Ethiopia, Tanzania, Mozambique, Malawi, Zambia, Zimbabwe and Angola	600–2,100 metres (2,000–6,900 ft)
	Bulbophyllum nummularia (H.Wendl. & Kraenzl.) Rolfe 1897	Cameroon	
	Bulbophyllum parvum Summerh. 1957	Sierra Leone	700 metres (2,300 ft)
	Bulbophyllum purpureorhachis (De Wild.) Schltr 1914	Congo, Cameroon, Gabon, Ivory Coast and Zaire	
	Bulbophyllum renkinianum (Laurent) De Wild. 1921	Gabon and Zaire	
	Bulbophyllum resupinatum Ridley 1877	Cameroon, Gabon, Ghana, Ivory Coast, Liberia, Nigeria, Sao Tome, Sierra Leone and Zaire	
	Bulbophyllum sandersonii (Hook.f.) Rchb.f. 1878	Ghana, Ivory Coast, Liberia, Nigeria, Cameroon, Gabon, Congo Rwanda and Zaire	200–2,200 metres (660–7,220 ft)
	Bulbophyllum sangae Schltr. 1905	Congo	
	Bulbophyllum scaberulum (Rolfe) Bolus 1889	Ghana, Guinea, Ivory Coast, Liberia, Nigeria, Sierra Leone, Togo, Central African Republic, Cameroon, Congo, Gabon, Gulf of Guinea Islands, Zaire, Chad, Ethiopia, Sudan, Uganda, Kenya, Tanzania, Angola, Malawi, Mozambique, Zambia, Zimbabwe, South Africa(Cape Province and Natal)	100–2,300 metres (330–7,550 ft)

== Natural Hybrids ==
Image	Name	Distribution	Elevation (m)	Parentage
	Bulbophyllum × chikukwa Fibeck & Mavi 2000 publ. 2001	Zimbabwe		Bulbophyllum maximum × Bulbophyllum scaberulum
