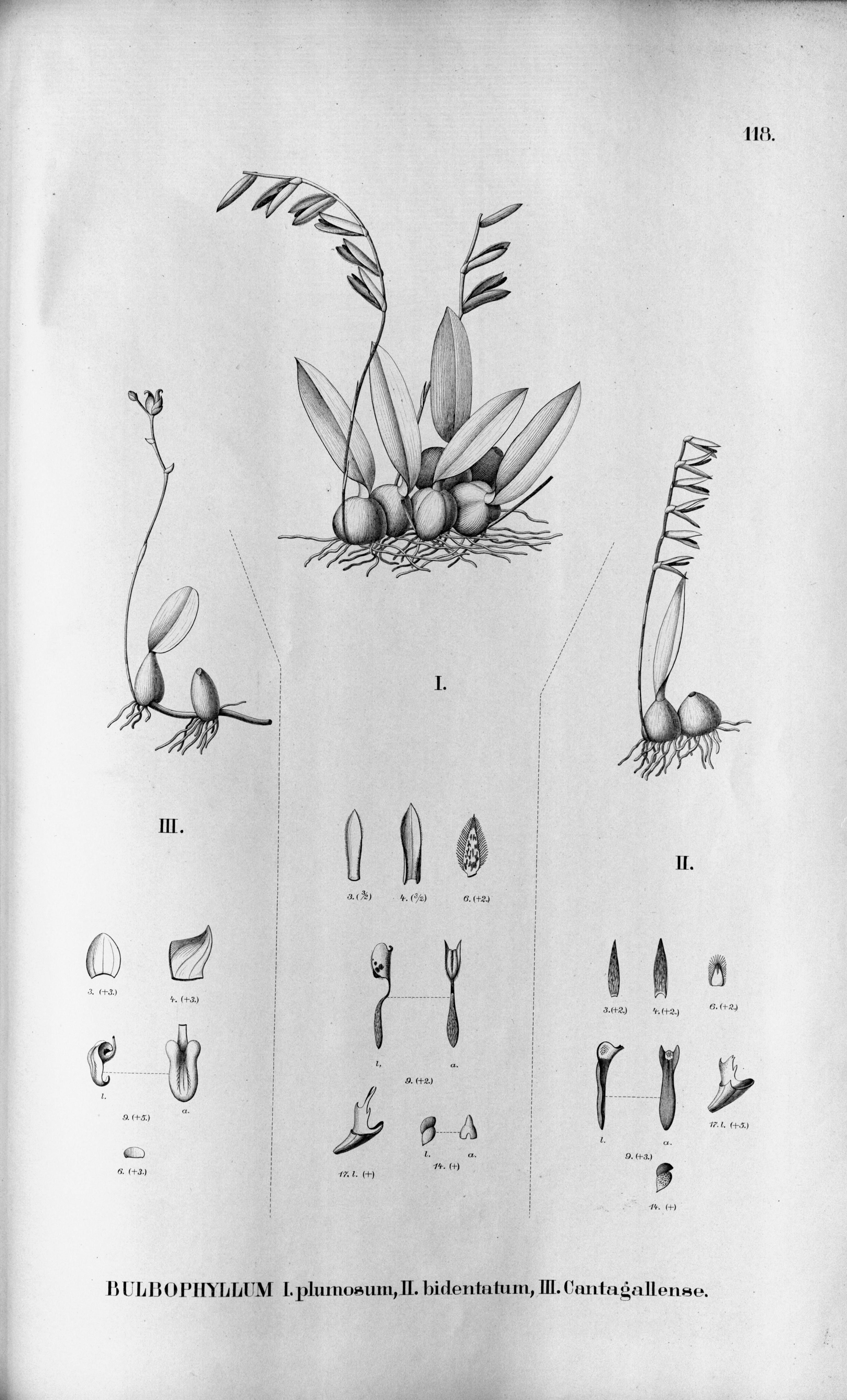
- Figure I (Bulbophyllum plumosum) and Figure II (Bulbophyllum_bidentatum) represent members of Bulbophyllum sect. Xiphizusa

Scientific classification
- Kingdom: Plantae
- Clade: Tracheophytes
- Clade: Angiosperms
- Clade: Monocots
- Order: Asparagales
- Family: Orchidaceae
- Subfamily: Epidendroideae
- Genus: Bulbophyllum
- Section: Bulbophyllum sect. Xiphizusa (Rchb. f.) Cogn. 1902

Type species
- Bulbophyllum chloropterum

Species
- See text

Synonyms
- Xiphizusa Rchb. f.

= Bulbophyllum sect. Xiphizusa =

Section of flowering plants

Bulbophyllum sect. Xiphizusa is a section of the genus Bulbophyllum. It is one of six Bulbophyllum sections found in the Americas.

== Description ==
Species in this section have unifoliate pseudobulbs, inflorescence with a thin rachis holding flowers that are distichously arranged. Lateral sepals united to form a synsepal and petals are erect. Column foot with entire apex and shorter than the length of the column.

== Distribution ==
Plants from this section are found from Mexico down to Brazil, Bolivia, Paraguay, and Venezuela.

== Species ==
Bulbophyllum section Xiphizusa comprises the following species:

Image	Name	Distribution	Elevation (m)
	Bulbophyllum amazonicum L.O.Williams 1939	Bolivia	
	Bulbophyllum antioquiense Kraenzl. 1899	Colombia (Antioquia)	
	Bulbophyllum arianeae Fraga & E.C.Smidt 2004	Brazil (Espirito Santo)	300–470 metres (980–1,540 ft)
	Bulbophyllum barbatum Barb.Rodr. 1881	Brazil (Minas Gerais )	
	Bulbophyllum bidentatum (Barb.Rodr.) Cogn. 1902	Brazil (Minas Gerais )	
	Bulbophyllum carassense R.C.Mota, F.Barros & Stehmann 2009	Brazil (Minas Gerais )	1,200 metres (3,900 ft)
	Bulbophyllum chloropterum Rchb.f. 1850	Brazil (Rio de Janeiro and Minas Gerais)	800 metres (2,600 ft)
	Bulbophyllum ciluliae Bianch. & J.A.N.Bat. 2004	Brazil (Goiás)	1,390 metres (4,560 ft)
	Bulbophyllum dusenii Kraenzl. 1911	Brazil(Parana)	
	Bulbophyllum fendlerianum E.C.Smidt & P.J.Cribb 2008	Venezuela and Brazil	1,500 metres (4,900 ft)
	Bulbophyllum filifolium Borba & E.C. Smidt 2004	Brazil (Minas Gerais)	800–1,200 metres (2,600–3,900 ft)
	Bulbophyllum gehrtii E.C.Smidt & Borba 2009	Brazil	300 metres (980 ft)
	Bulbophyllum gladiatum Lindl.1842	Brazil (Bahia, Districto Federal, Minas Gerais, Espirito Santo, Rio de Janeiro, Sao Paulo, Parana, Santa Catarina)	
	Bulbophyllum hatschbachianum E.C.Smidt & Borba 2008	Brazil (Minas Gerais)	950 metres (3,120 ft)
	Bulbophyllum hoehnei E.C.Smidt & Borba 2007	Brazil (Minas Gerais)	700 metres (2,300 ft)
	Bulbophyllum jacintense Campacci 2019	Brazil (Minas Gerais)	600 metres (2,000 ft)
	Bulbophyllum jamaicense Cogn. 1909	Jamaica	150–900 metres (490–2,950 ft)
	Bulbophyllum laciniatum (Barb. Rodr.) Cogn. 1902	Brazil and Paraguay	1,200 metres (3,900 ft)
	Bulbophyllum longipetalum Pabst 1964	southeastern Brazil	
	Bulbophyllum manarae Foldats 1968	Venezuela and Brazil (Minas Gerais)	1,000–1,500 metres (3,300–4,900 ft)
	Bulbophyllum melloi Pabst 1977	Brazil	
	Bulbophyllum parex J. Alvarez-Diaz & J.S. Moreno 2023	Colombia (Hulia)	1,070 metres (3,510 ft)
	Bulbophyllum paterangeli Campacci 2019	Brazil (Minas Gerais)	500 metres (1,600 ft)
	Bulbophyllum plumosum (Barb.Rodr.) Cogn. 1902	Brazil ( Sao Paulo, Rio Grande do Sul, Goias, Minas Gerais and Espirito Santo )	
	Bulbophyllum solangeanum Campacci 2019	Brazil (Minas Gerais)	900 metres (3,000 ft)
	Bulbophyllum solteroi R.González 1992	Mexico (Jalisco)	1,000 metres (3,300 ft)
	Bulbophyllum teimosense E.C.Smidt & Borba 2009	Brazil (Bahia)	
	Bulbophyllum vareschii Foldats 1968	Venezuela	700 metres (2,300 ft)
	Bulbophyllum weberbauerianum Kraenzl. 1905	Peru and Bolivia	1,600 metres (5,200 ft)
