= Bulbophyllum × cipoense =

Scientific classification
- Kingdom: Plantae
- Clade: Tracheophytes
- Clade: Angiosperms
- Clade: Monocots
- Order: Asparagales
- Family: Orchidaceae
- Subfamily: Epidendroideae
- Genus: Bulbophyllum
- Section: Bulbophyllum sect. Didactyle
- Species: B. × cipoense

Binomial name
- Bulbophyllum × cipoense Borba & Semir

Species of orchid

Bulbophyllum × cipoense is a natural hybrid of Bulbophyllum involutum × Bulbophyllum weddelii in the genus Bulbophyllum found in Brazil.
