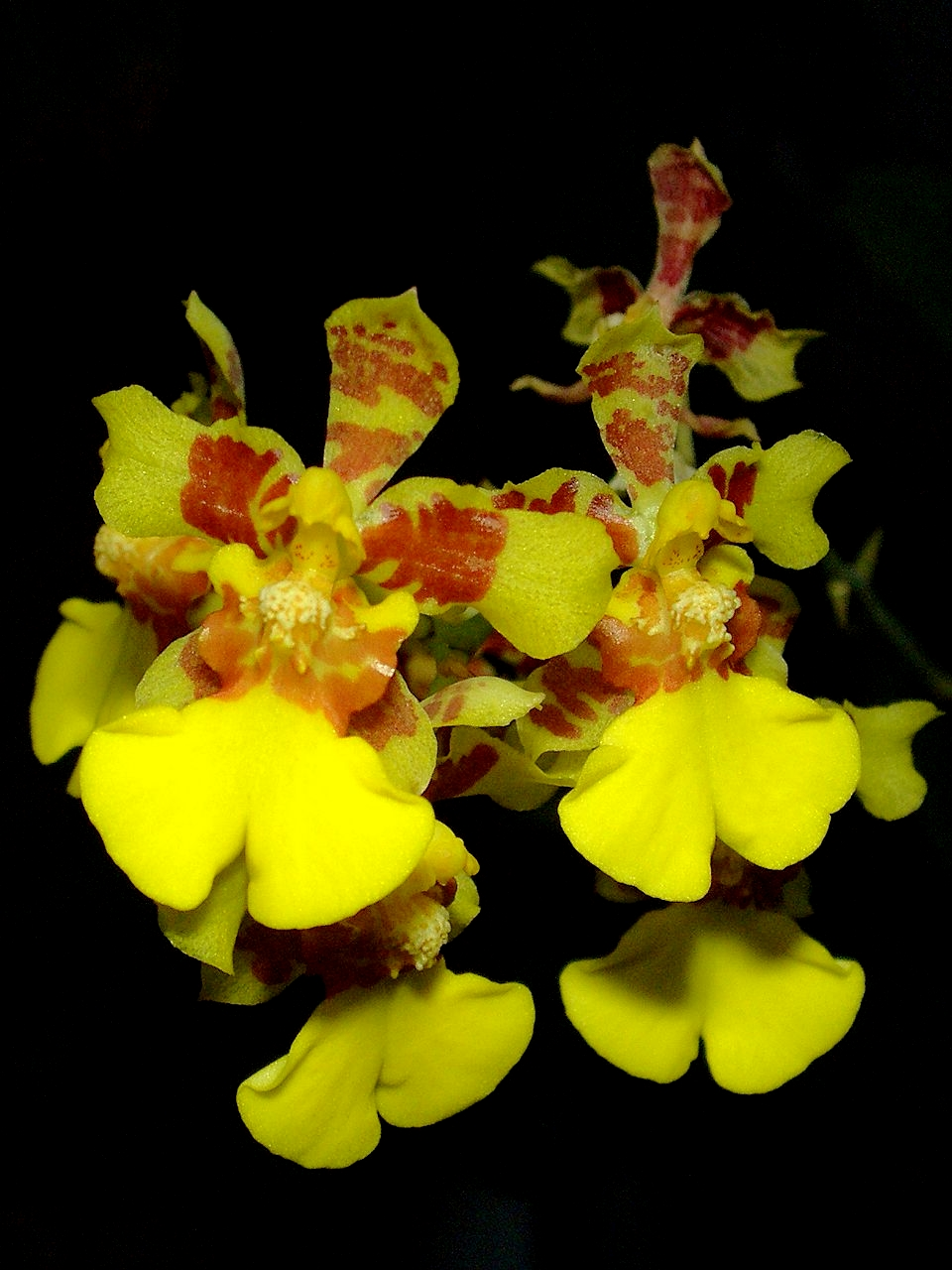

Scientific classification
- Kingdom: Plantae
- Clade: Tracheophytes
- Clade: Angiosperms
- Clade: Monocots
- Order: Asparagales
- Family: Orchidaceae
- Subfamily: Epidendroideae
- Genus: Vitekorchis
- Species: V. aurifera

Binomial name
- Vitekorchis aurifera (Rchb.f.) J.M.H.Shaw

Synonyms
- Oncidium armillare Lindl.; Oncidium foveatum Lindl.; Oncidium callistum Rchb.f. ex Kraenzl.; Oncidium oxystegium Kraenzl.; Oncidium aurorae D.E.Benn. & Christenson; Oncidium auriferum Rchb.f.; Vitekorchis callistum (Kraenzl.) Romowicz & Szlach.; Vitekorchis foveatus (Lindl.) Romowicz & Szlach.

= Vitekorchis aurifera =

Species of orchid

Vitekorchis aurifera is a species of orchid ranging from western South America to northwestern Venezuela.
