= Pterostylis tenuicauda =

Scientific classification
- Kingdom: Plantae
- Clade: Tracheophytes
- Clade: Angiosperms
- Clade: Monocots
- Order: Asparagales
- Family: Orchidaceae
- Subfamily: Orchidoideae
- Tribe: Cranichideae
- Genus: Pterostylis
- Species: P. tenuicauda

Binomial name
- Pterostylis tenuicauda Kraenzl.

Synonyms
- Taurantha tenuicauda (Kraenzl. & M.A.Clem.) D.L.Jones & M.A.Clem.

Species of orchid

Pterostylis tenuicauda is a plant in the orchid family Orchidaceae and is endemic to New Caledonia. It was first formally described in 1929 by Friedrich Kraenzlin and the description was published in Vierteljahrsschrift der Naturforschenden Gesellschaft in Zurich.
