= Bulbophyllum × chikukwa =

Scientific classification
- Kingdom: Plantae
- Clade: Tracheophytes
- Clade: Angiosperms
- Clade: Monocots
- Order: Asparagales
- Family: Orchidaceae
- Subfamily: Epidendroideae
- Genus: Bulbophyllum
- Species: B. × chikukwa

Binomial name
- Bulbophyllum × chikukwa Fibeck & Mavi

Species of flowering plant

Bulbophyllum × chikukwa is a natural hybrid of Bulbophyllum maximum × Bulbophyllum scaberulum found in Zimbabwe.
