= Disa satyriopsis =

Conservation status
- Data Deficient (IUCN 3.1)

Scientific classification
- Kingdom: Plantae
- Clade: Tracheophytes
- Clade: Angiosperms
- Clade: Monocots
- Order: Asparagales
- Family: Orchidaceae
- Subfamily: Orchidoideae
- Genus: Disa
- Species: D. satyriopsis

Binomial name
- Disa satyriopsis Kraenzl.

Synonyms
- Disa ochrostachya var. latipetala G.Will.

Species of flowering plant

Disa satyriopsis is a perennial plant and geophyte belonging to the genus Disa. The plant is native to Burundi, Malawi, Tanzania and Zambia.
