= Catasetum triodon =

Scientific classification
- Kingdom: Plantae
- Clade: Tracheophytes
- Clade: Angiosperms
- Clade: Monocots
- Order: Asparagales
- Family: Orchidaceae
- Subfamily: Epidendroideae
- Genus: Catasetum
- Species: C. triodon

Binomial name
- Catasetum triodon Rchb.f
- The distribution of Catasetum triodon

Synonyms
- Catasetum monodon Kraenzl.

Species of orchid

Catasetum triodon, the three-clawed catasetum, is an pseudobulbeous epiphytic species of orchid endemic to south Brazil.

A Herbarium Catalougue Specimens photo of a Catasetum triodon specimen

Genetic research show that Catasetum triodon has 83% genetic similarity with Catasetum uncatum.

== Description ==
One of its flowers

Catasetum triodon is a medium sized, cold-growing, epiphyte, with fusiform pseudobulbs and plicate leaves. Its flowered inflorescence are arching to pendant and usually have up to 10 flowers. It also blooms in the Summer and Fall. Its flowers are 4.5 cm (1.8 in) and have light green petals sometimes having brownish spots and stripes, sometimes having yellow, orange, red, maroon, burgundy, or pink near the lip.

== Care ==
One of its buds

Catasetum triodon needs a lux level of around 45000, a shade level of around 50%, and 70% humidity. It also goes into a leaf-drop state during winter like other Catasetum species.

== Distribution ==
A flowering inflorescence

Catasetum triodon is endemic to Brazil, specifically in the states of Santa Catarina, Paraná, and Rio Grande do Sul also known as the South region. It is usually found in dry areas in coastal forests by the Atlantic Ocean.

== Taxonomy and etymology ==
Botanical illustration as Catasetum monodon

Catasetum triodon was described by Heinrich Gustav Reichenbach, in Otto, Hamb. Gartenz in 1857. While its synonym Catasetum monodon was described by Kraenzl. in Gard. Chron., ser. 3, 35: 354 in 1904.
