= Bulbophyllum micholitzianum =

Scientific classification
- Kingdom: Plantae
- Clade: Tracheophytes
- Clade: Angiosperms
- Clade: Monocots
- Order: Asparagales
- Family: Orchidaceae
- Subfamily: Epidendroideae
- Genus: Bulbophyllum
- Species: B. micholitzianum

Binomial name
- Bulbophyllum micholitzianum Kraenzl.

Species of orchid

Bulbophyllum micholitzianum is a species of orchid in the genus Bulbophyllum from Sumatera.

They are small sized, carrying a single apical leaf and blooms in the spring on a basal. This specie is a single flowered inflorescence that requires light shade, ample water, and good air circulation. It has a flower size of 4 inches.
