= Bulbophyllum claussenii =

Scientific classification
- Kingdom: Plantae
- Clade: Tracheophytes
- Clade: Angiosperms
- Clade: Monocots
- Order: Asparagales
- Family: Orchidaceae
- Subfamily: Epidendroideae
- Genus: Bulbophyllum
- Section: Bulbophyllum sect. Didactyle
- Species: B. claussenii

Binomial name
- Bulbophyllum claussenii Rchb.f. 1846

Synonyms
- Didactyle claussenii (Rchb.f.) Lindl. 1852

Species of orchid

Bulbophyllum claussenii is a species of orchid in the genus Bulbophyllum.
