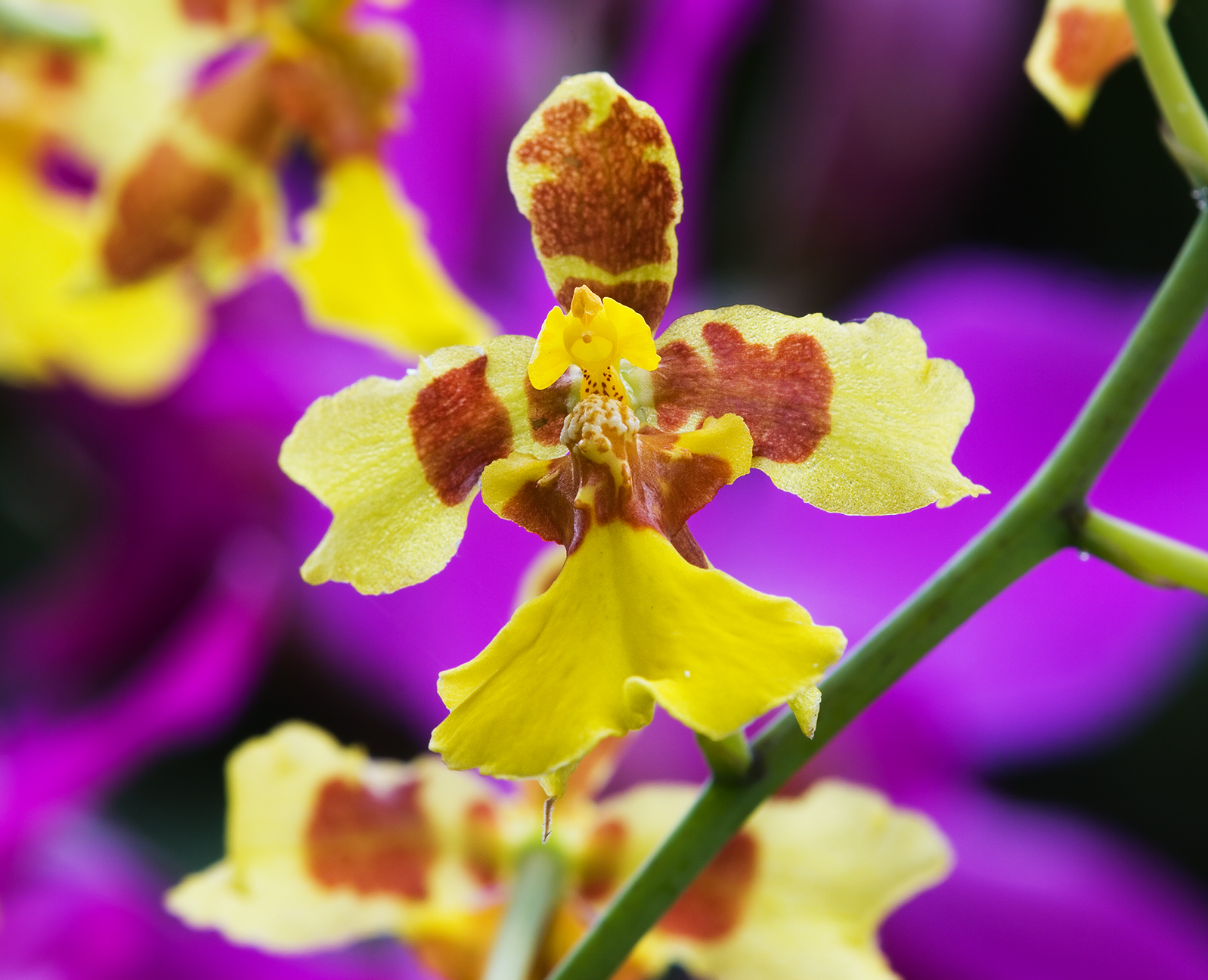

Scientific classification
- Kingdom: Plantae
- Clade: Tracheophytes
- Clade: Angiosperms
- Clade: Monocots
- Order: Asparagales
- Family: Orchidaceae
- Subfamily: Epidendroideae
- Genus: Vitekorchis
- Species: V. excavata

Binomial name
- Vitekorchis excavata (Lindl.) Romowicz & Szlach.

= Vitekorchis excavata =

Species of orchid

Vitekorchis excavata, also known as the hollow oncidium, is a species of orchid native to the Neotropics.

== Taxonomy ==
Synonyms include Oncidium aurosum, Oncidium boissieri, Oncidium excavatum var. dawsonii, Oncidium rupestre, Oncidium skinneri, and Oncidium excavatum.

== Description ==
The flowers, sepals and petals are yellow, spotted with brown.

== Distribution and habitat ==
Vitekorchis excavata is found naturally in Brazil, Peru, Colombia and Ecuador and grows on steep embankments in moist montane forest at elevations of 2400–2800 meters.
