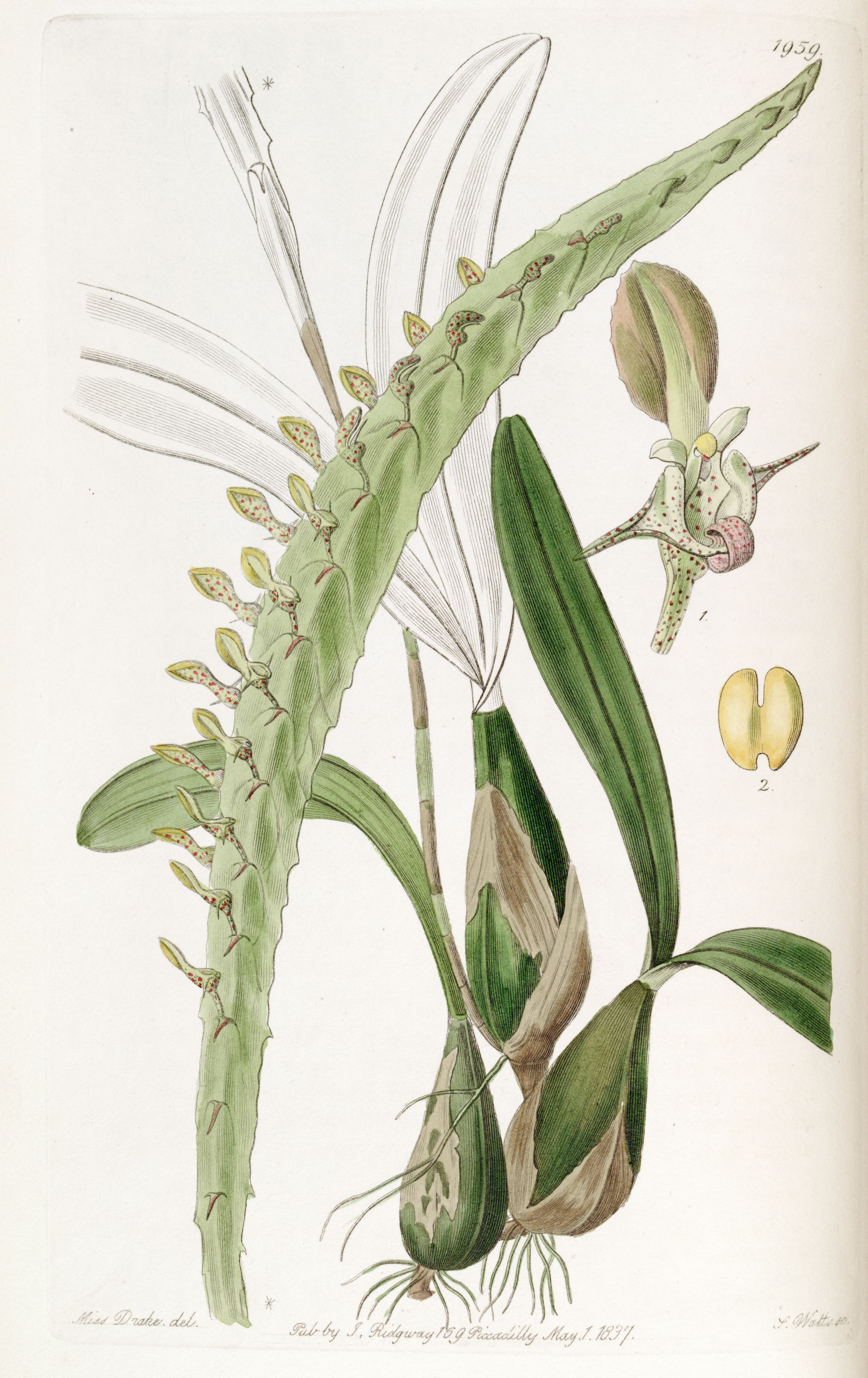

Scientific classification
- Kingdom: Plantae
- Clade: Tracheophytes
- Clade: Angiosperms
- Clade: Monocots
- Order: Asparagales
- Family: Orchidaceae
- Subfamily: Epidendroideae
- Genus: Bulbophyllum
- Species: B. calyptratum

Binomial name
- Bulbophyllum calyptratum Kraenzl. (1895)

Synonyms
- Megaclinium maximum Lindl. (1837); Megaclinium lindleyi Rolfe (1897); Megaclinium buchenauianum Kraenzl. (1905); Bulbophyllum lindleyi (Rolfe) Schltr. (1914); Megaclinium lepturum Kraenzl. (1916); Bulbophyllum buchenauianum (Kraenzl.) De Wild. (1921)

= Bulbophyllum calyptratum =

Hooded Bulbophyllum

Species of orchid (hooded bulbophyllum)

Bulbophyllum calyptratum (hooded bulbophyllum) is a species of orchid.
