= Bulbophyllum perii =

Scientific classification
- Kingdom: Plantae
- Clade: Tracheophytes
- Clade: Angiosperms
- Clade: Monocots
- Order: Asparagales
- Family: Orchidaceae
- Subfamily: Epidendroideae
- Genus: Bulbophyllum
- Section: Bulbophyllum sect. Didactyle
- Species: B. perii

Binomial name
- Bulbophyllum perii Schltr.

Synonyms
- Bulbophyllum proencai Leite 1948

Species of orchid

Bulbophyllum perii is a species of orchid in the genus Bulbophyllum.
