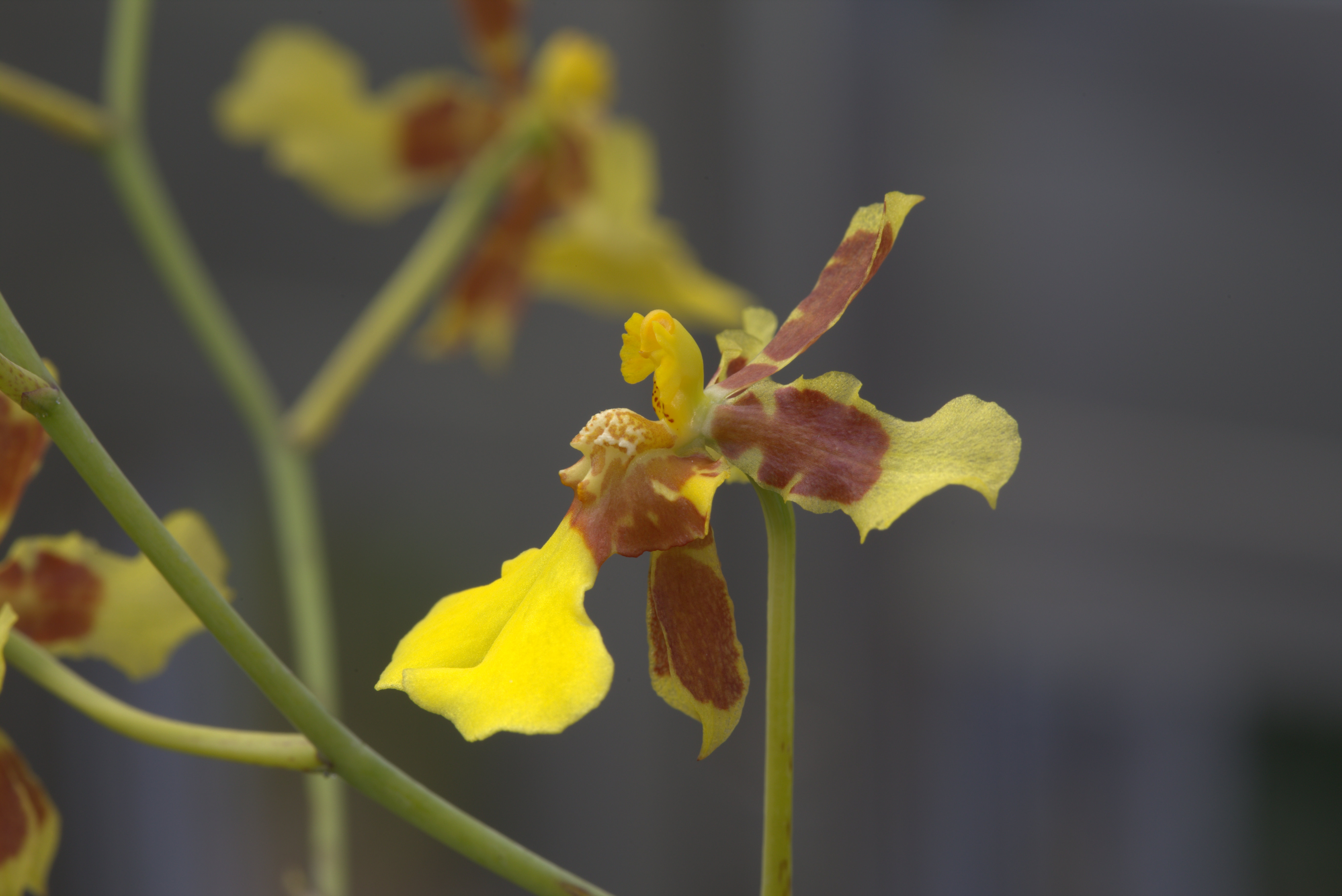
- Vitekorchis excavata

Scientific classification
- Kingdom: Plantae
- Clade: Tracheophytes
- Clade: Angiosperms
- Clade: Monocots
- Order: Asparagales
- Family: Orchidaceae
- Subfamily: Epidendroideae
- Tribe: Cymbidieae
- Subtribe: Oncidiinae
- Genus: Vitekorchis; Romowicz & Szlach.

= Vitekorchis =

Genus of flowering plants

Vitekorchis is a genus of flowering plants belonging to the family Orchidaceae.

It is native to Bolivia, Colombia, Ecuador, Peru and Venezuela in western South America.

== Known species ==
As accepted by Kew:

- Vitekorchis aurifera (Rchb.f.) J.M.H.Shaw
- Vitekorchis excavata (Lindl.) Romowicz & Szlach.
- Vitekorchis lucasiana (Rolfe) Romowicz & Szlach.
- Vitekorchis vasquezii (Christenson) Romowicz & Szlach.

The genus name of Vitekorchis is in honour of Ernst Vitek (b. 1953), an Austrian botanist at the museum of natural history in Vienna. It was first described and published in Polish Bot. J. Vol.51 on page 45 in 2006.
