= Bulbophyllum bolivianum =

Scientific classification
- Kingdom: Plantae
- Clade: Tracheophytes
- Clade: Angiosperms
- Clade: Monocots
- Order: Asparagales
- Family: Orchidaceae
- Subfamily: Epidendroideae
- Genus: Bulbophyllum
- Section: Bulbophyllum sect. Didactyle
- Species: B. bolivianum

Binomial name
- Bulbophyllum bolivianum Schltr. 1922

Species of orchid

Bulbophyllum bolivianum is a species of orchid in the genus Bulbophyllum found in Bolivia at elevations around 1524 meters.

== Description ==
This species is epiphytic with thick rhizomes and 5 mm diameter unifoliate quadrangular pseudobulbs 2-2.5 cm high. Leaves are 1.3 cm thick erect oblong ligulate obtuse base, 8-11 x 2-2.5 cm. Plant blooms on a 25 cm long scape with multiple flowers. Sepals are ligulate 1.5 cm long, petals narrowly falcate linear and ovary is 4 mm long.
