= Bulbophyllum meridense =

Scientific classification
- Kingdom: Plantae
- Clade: Tracheophytes
- Clade: Angiosperms
- Clade: Monocots
- Order: Asparagales
- Family: Orchidaceae
- Subfamily: Epidendroideae
- Genus: Bulbophyllum
- Section: Bulbophyllum sect. Didactyle
- Species: B. meridense

Binomial name
- Bulbophyllum meridense Rchb. f.

Synonyms
- Didactyle meridensis (Rchb.f.) Lindl. 1852; Phyllorkis meridensis (Rchb.f.) Kuntze 1891; Bulbophyllum teresense Ruschi 1946; Didactyle gladiata Lindl. 1852; Xiphizusa chloroptera Rchb.f. 1852; Xiphizusa gladiata (Lindl.) Rchb.f. 1852

Species of orchid

Bulbophyllum meridense is a species of orchid in the genus Bulbophyllum.
