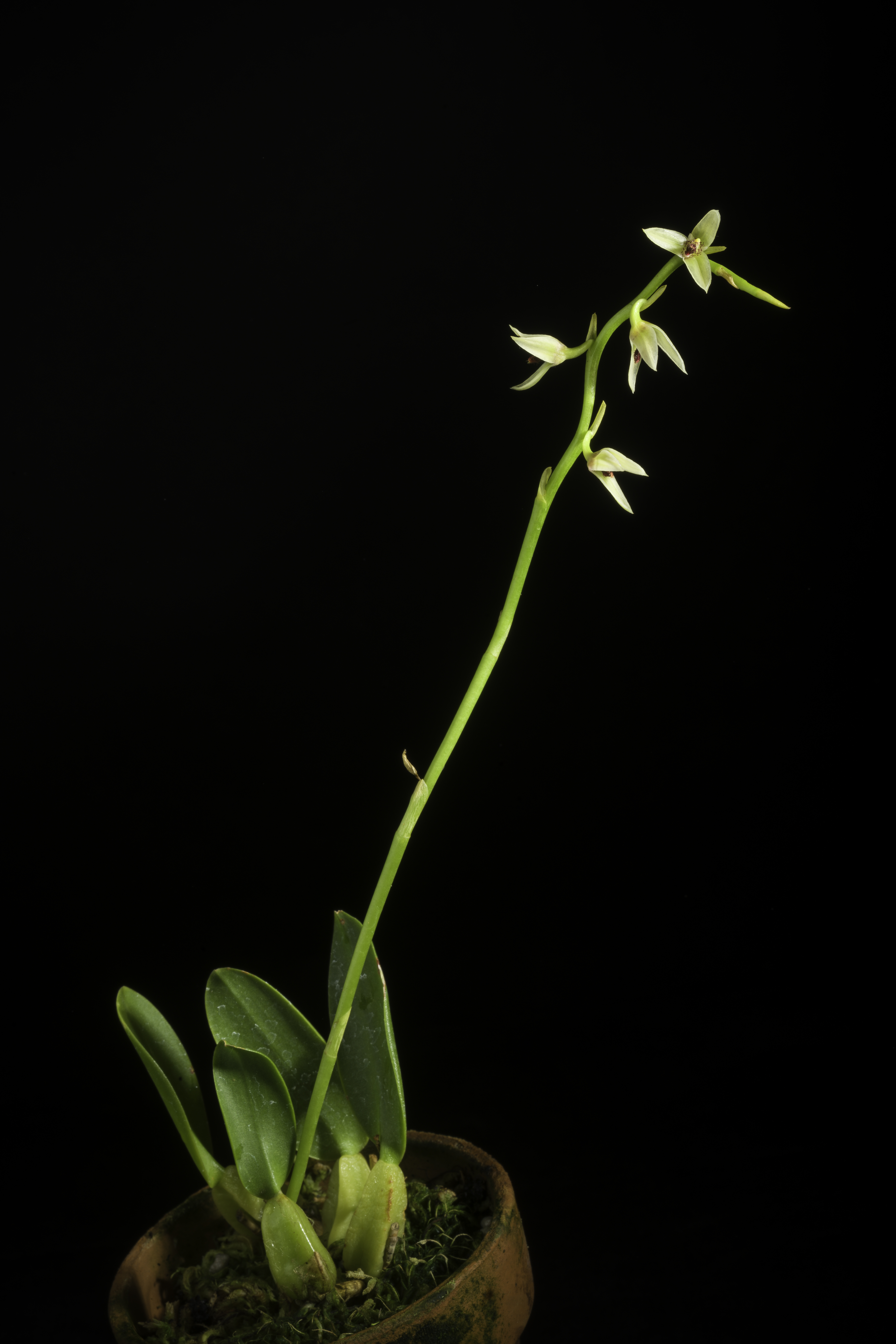
- Bulbophyllum tripetalum

Scientific classification
- Kingdom: Plantae
- Clade: Tracheophytes
- Clade: Angiosperms
- Clade: Monocots
- Order: Asparagales
- Family: Orchidaceae
- Subfamily: Epidendroideae
- Genus: Bulbophyllum
- Section: Bulbophyllum sect. Didactyle [Lindley] Cogn. 1902

Type species
- Bulbophyllum exaltatum

Species
- See text

Synonyms
- Didactyle Lindl.

= Bulbophyllum sect. Didactyle =

Section of flowering plants

Bulbophyllum sect. Didactyle is a section of the genus Bulbophyllum. It is one of six Bulbophyllum sections found in the Americas.

== Description ==
Species in this section have unifoliate pseudobulbs, inflorescence with a thin rachis holding flowers that are distichously arranged. Lateral sepals totally free, petals patent. Column foot with bilobed apex and shorter than the length of the column.

== Distribution ==
Plants from this section are found from Venezuela, Guyana, Colombia, Paraguay, through Brazil, Bolivia, and Argentina.

== Species ==
Bulbophyllum section Didactyle comprises the following species:

Image	Name	Distribution	Elevation (m)
	Bulbophyllum bolivianum Schltr. 1922	Bolivia	1,524 metres (5,000 ft)
	Bulbophyllum claussenii Rchb.f. 1846	Brazil (Minas Gerais)	
	Bulbophyllum dacruzii Campacci 2010	Brazil (Minas Gerais)	220 metres (720 ft)
	Bulbophyllum exaltatum Lindl. 1842	southern Venezuela, Guyana and northern Brazil	800–1,600 metres (2,600–5,200 ft)
	Bulbophyllum geraense Rchb.f. 1864	Guyana, Venezuela, and Brazil (Minas Gerais)	
	Bulbophyllum incarum Kraenzl. 1905	Peru	800 metres (2,600 ft)
	Bulbophyllum involutum Borba, Semir & F.Barros 1998	Brazil (Minas Gerais and Bahia )	1,000–1,700 metres (3,300–5,600 ft)
	Bulbophyllum ipanemense Hoehne 1938	Brazil (Bahia, Minas Gerais, Rio De Janeiro, and Espirito Santo)	1,800 metres (5,900 ft)
	Bulbophyllum lehmannianum Kraenzl. 1899	Colombia and Venezuela	1,400–1,600 metres (4,600–5,200 ft)
	Bulbophyllum machupicchuense D.E.Benn. & Christenson 2001	Peru	2,500 metres (8,200 ft)
	Bulbophyllum margaritiphorum Jenny & Speckm. 2020	Peru	200–300 metres (660–980 ft)
	Bulbophyllum meridense Rchb.f.1850	Venezuela, Colombia, Ecuador, Peru and northern Brazil	900–1,500 metres (3,000–4,900 ft)
	Bulbophyllum paranaense Schltr. 1919	Brazil (Parana and Sao Paulo)	
	Bulbophyllum perii Schltr. 1922	Brazil (Goiás, Minas Gerais and Paraná)	
	Bulbophyllum popayanense Kraenzl. 1899	Colombia (Minas Gerais)	
	Bulbophyllum reiginaldoi Campacci 2009	Brazil	600 metres (2,000 ft)
	Bulbophyllum roraimense Rolfe 1896	Venezuela, Guyana, French Guiana and Brazil (Bahia)	1,700 metres (5,600 ft)
	Bulbophyllum sanderianum Rolfe 1893	Brazil (Minas Gerais, Pernambuco and Alagoas)	500–600 metres (1,600–2,000 ft)
	Bulbophyllum tripetalum Lindl. 1842	Brazil, Argentina and Paraguay	740 metres (2,430 ft)
	Bulbophyllum weddelii [Lindley]Rchb.f 1864	Brazil (Espirito Santo, Rio de Janeiro, and Minas Gerais)	1,000–1,500 metres (3,300–4,900 ft)

== Natural Hybrids ==
Image	Name	Distribution	Elevation (m)	Parentage
	Bulbophyllum × guartelae Mancinelli & E.C.Smidt 2012	Brazil	700–900 metres (2,300–3,000 ft)	Bulbophyllum tripetalum × Bulbophyllum perii
	Bulbophyllum × cipoense Borba & Semir 1998	Brazil (Bahia, Minas Gerais)		Bulbophyllum involutum × Bulbophyllum weddelii
