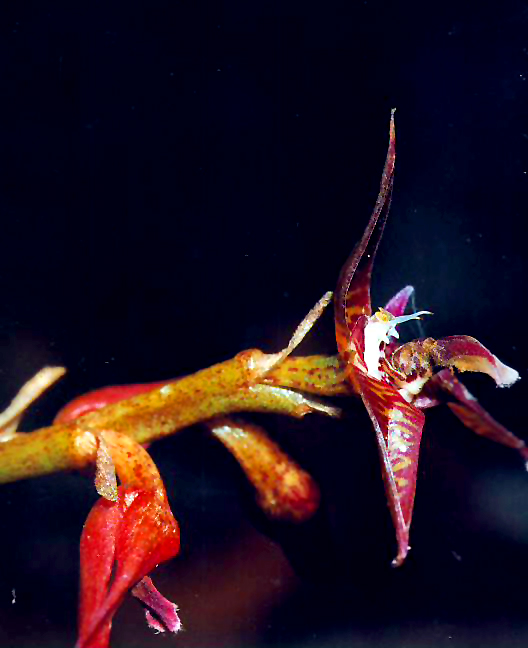

Scientific classification
- Kingdom: Plantae
- Clade: Tracheophytes
- Clade: Angiosperms
- Clade: Monocots
- Order: Asparagales
- Family: Orchidaceae
- Subfamily: Epidendroideae
- Genus: Bulbophyllum
- Section: Bulbophyllum sect. Didactyle
- Species: B. exaltatum

Binomial name
- Bulbophyllum exaltatum Lindl.

Synonyms
- Didactyle exaltata (Lindl.) Lindl. 1852; Phyllorkis exaltata (Lindl.) Kuntze 1891; Bulbophyllum gomesii Fraga 1999; Bulbophyllum longispicatum Cogn. 1893; Bulbophyllum vaughanii Brade 1951; Bulbophyllum vittatum Rchb.f. & Warm. 1881; Bulbophyllum warmingianum Cogn. 1902

= Bulbophyllum exaltatum =

Species of orchid

Bulbophyllum exaltatum is a species of orchid in the genus Bulbophyllum.
