= Bulbophyllum geraense =

Scientific classification
- Kingdom: Plantae
- Clade: Tracheophytes
- Clade: Angiosperms
- Clade: Monocots
- Order: Asparagales
- Family: Orchidaceae
- Subfamily: Epidendroideae
- Genus: Bulbophyllum
- Section: Bulbophyllum sect. Didactyle
- Species: B. geraense

Binomial name
- Bulbophyllum geraense Rchb. f.

Synonyms
- Bulbophyllum antenniferum (Lindl.) Rchb.f. 1861; Didactyle antennifera Lindl. 1852; Phyllorkis geraensis (Rchb.f.) Kuntze 1891

Species of orchid

Bulbophyllum geraense is a species of orchid in the genus Bulbophyllum.
