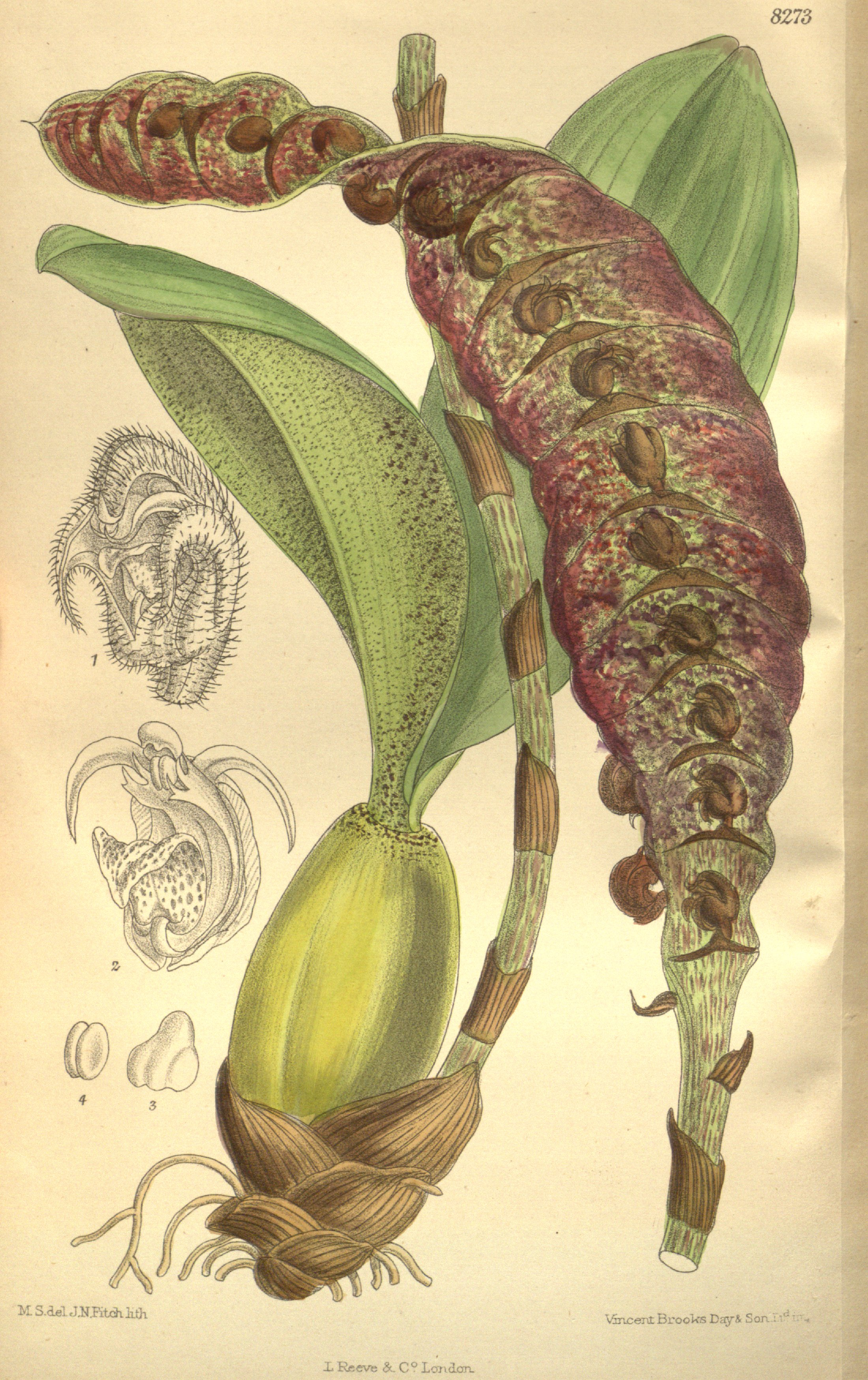

Scientific classification
- Kingdom: Plantae
- Clade: Tracheophytes
- Clade: Angiosperms
- Clade: Monocots
- Order: Asparagales
- Family: Orchidaceae
- Subfamily: Epidendroideae
- Genus: Bulbophyllum
- Species: B. purpureorhachis

Binomial name
- Bulbophyllum purpureorhachis (De Wild.) Schltr.

Synonyms
- Megaclinium purpureorhachis De Wild. (1903)

= Bulbophyllum purpureorhachis =

Species of orchid

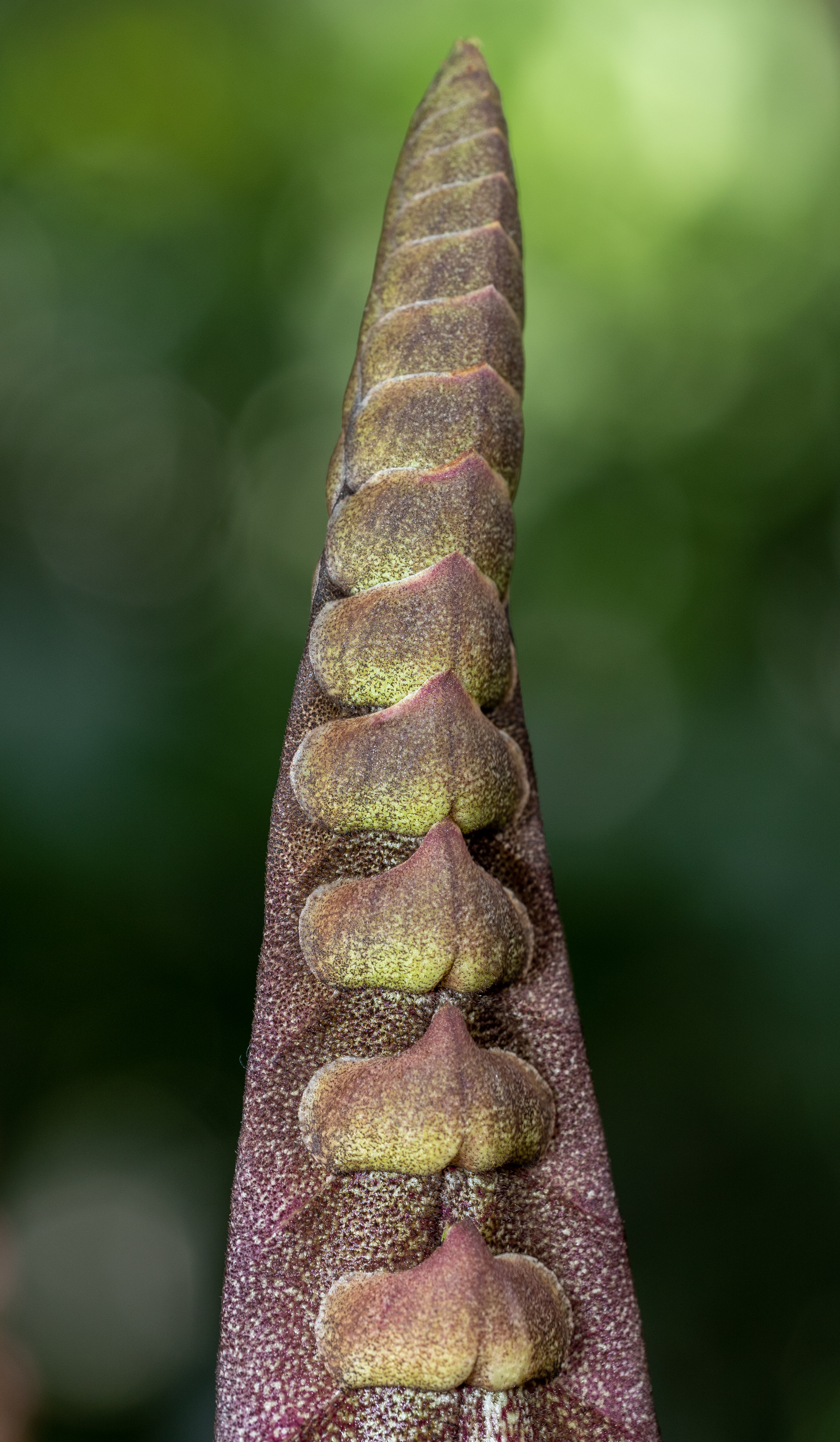
Rachis

Bulbophyllum purpureorhachis is a species of orchid in the genus Bulbophyllum.
