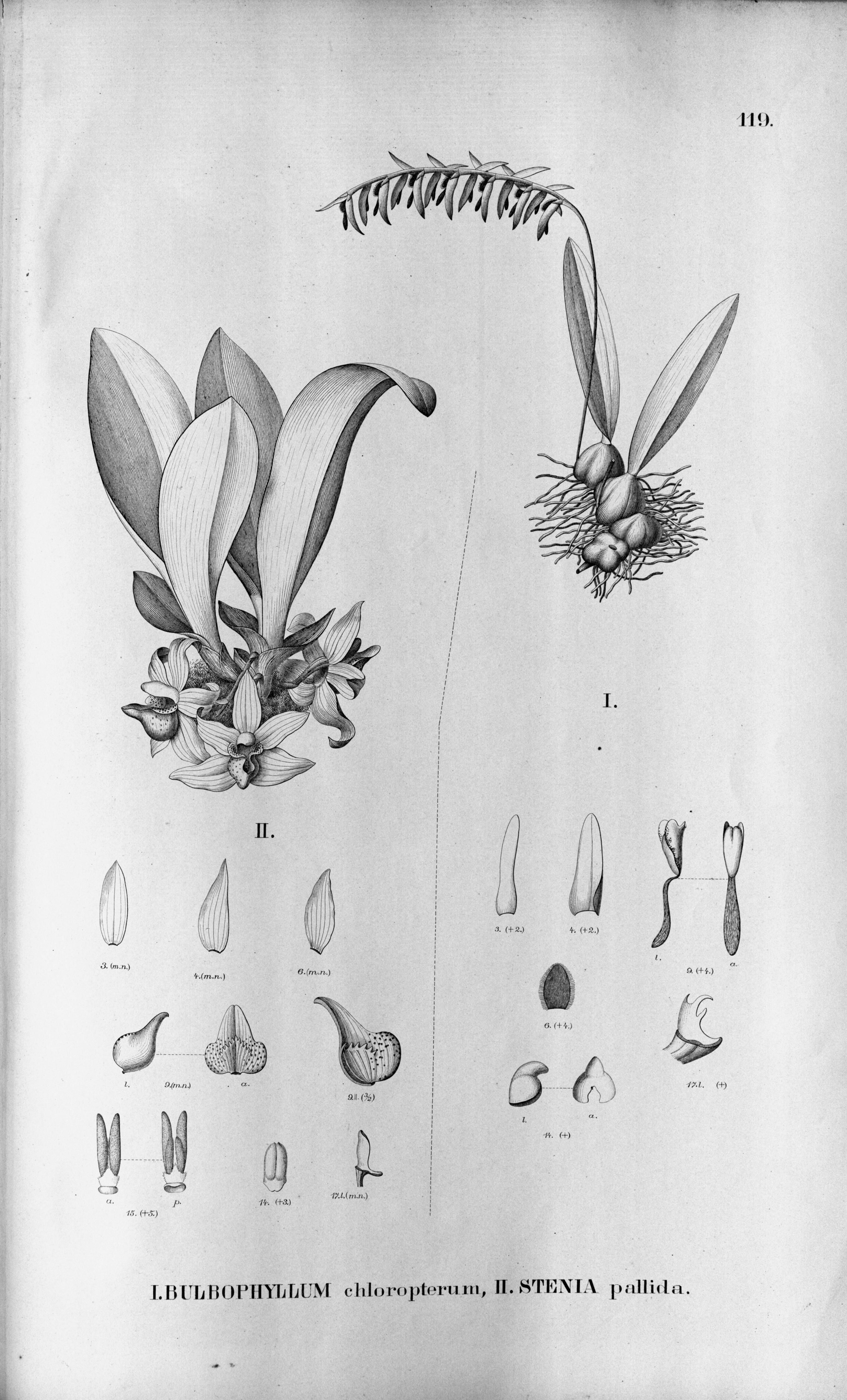

Scientific classification
- Kingdom: Plantae
- Clade: Tracheophytes
- Clade: Angiosperms
- Clade: Monocots
- Order: Asparagales
- Family: Orchidaceae
- Subfamily: Epidendroideae
- Genus: Bulbophyllum
- Species: B. chloropterum

Binomial name
- Bulbophyllum chloropterum Rchb.f. 1850

= Bulbophyllum chloropterum =

Species of orchid

Bulbophyllum chloropterum is a species of orchid in the genus Bulbophyllum found in Rio de Janeiro and Minas Gerais, Brazil.
