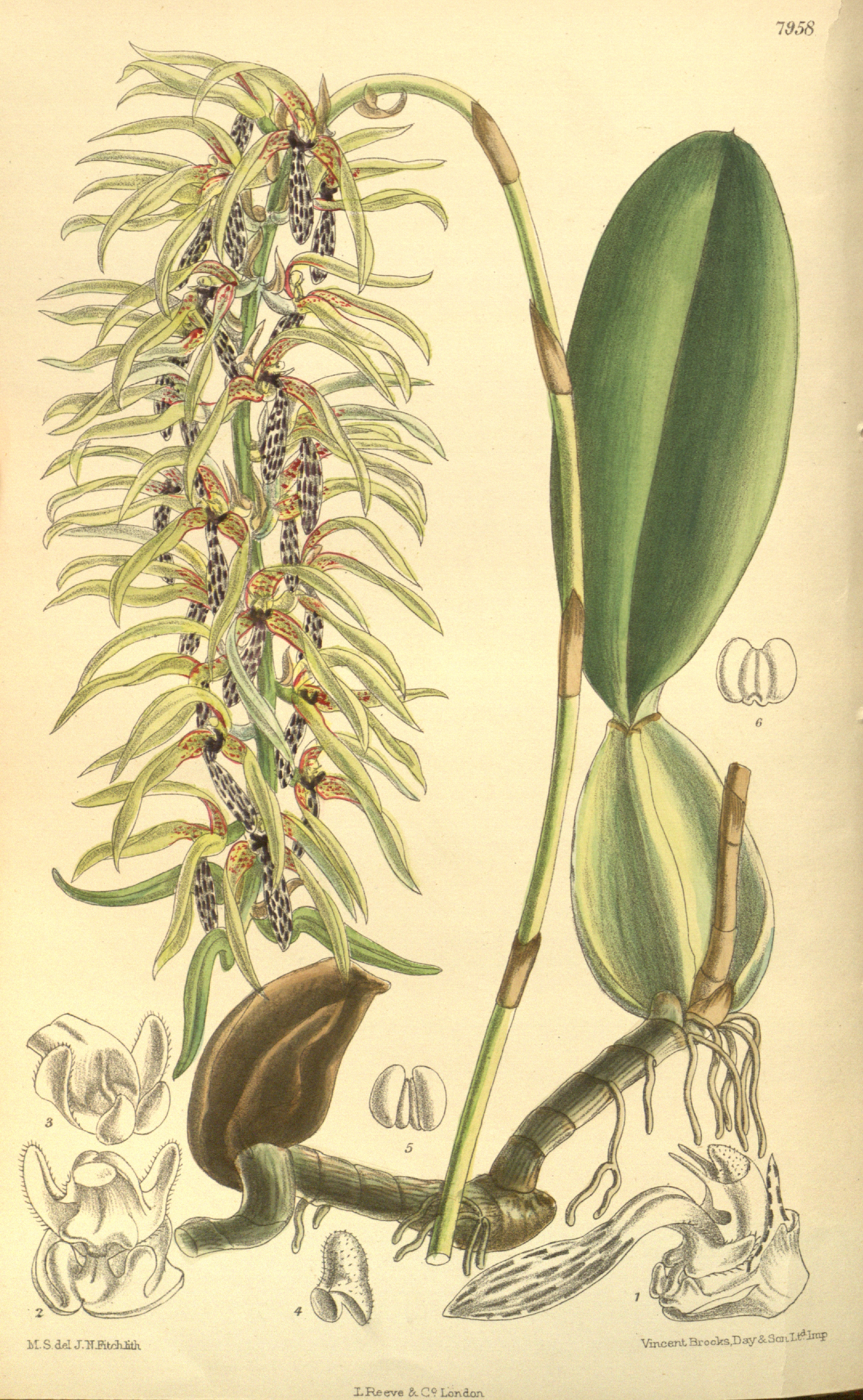

Scientific classification
- Kingdom: Plantae
- Clade: Tracheophytes
- Clade: Angiosperms
- Clade: Monocots
- Order: Asparagales
- Family: Orchidaceae
- Subfamily: Epidendroideae
- Genus: Bulbophyllum
- Section: Bulbophyllum sect. Didactyle
- Species: B. weddelii

Binomial name
- Bulbophyllum weddelii (Lindl.) Rchb.f. (1861)

Synonyms
- Didactyle weddelii Lindl. (1852) (Basionym); Xiphizusa weddelii (Lindl.) Rchb.f. (1852); Phyllorkis weddellii (Lindl.) Kuntze (1891)

= Bulbophyllum weddelii =

Weddel's bulbophyllum

Species of orchid

Bulbophyllum weddelii (Weddel's bulbophyllum) is a species of orchid.
