= Bulbophyllum bidentatum =

Scientific classification
- Kingdom: Plantae
- Clade: Tracheophytes
- Clade: Angiosperms
- Clade: Monocots
- Order: Asparagales
- Family: Orchidaceae
- Subfamily: Epidendroideae
- Genus: Bulbophyllum
- Species: B. bidentatum

Binomial name
- Bulbophyllum bidentatum (Barb.Rodr.) Cogn. 1902

Species of orchid

Bulbophyllum bidentatum is a species of orchid in the genus Bulbophyllum found in Minas Gerais, Brazil.
