= Bulbophyllum manarae =

Scientific classification
- Kingdom: Plantae
- Clade: Tracheophytes
- Clade: Angiosperms
- Clade: Monocots
- Order: Asparagales
- Family: Orchidaceae
- Subfamily: Epidendroideae
- Genus: Bulbophyllum
- Species: B. manarae

Binomial name
- Bulbophyllum manarae Foldats 1968

Species of orchid

Bulbophyllum manarae is a species of orchid in the genus Bulbophyllum found in Minas Gerais, Brazil and Venezuela.
