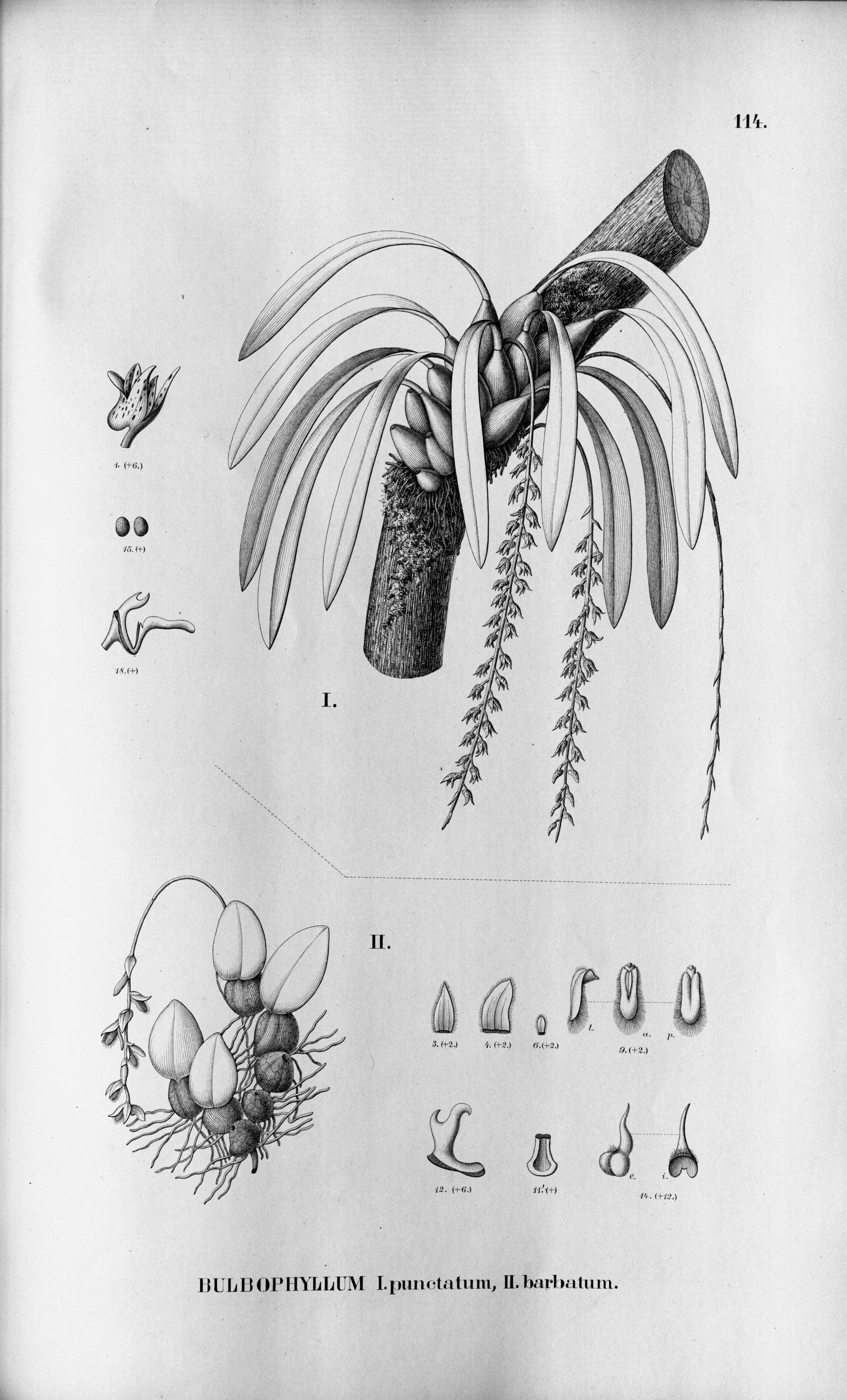

Scientific classification
- Kingdom: Plantae
- Clade: Tracheophytes
- Clade: Angiosperms
- Clade: Monocots
- Order: Asparagales
- Family: Orchidaceae
- Subfamily: Epidendroideae
- Genus: Bulbophyllum
- Species: B. barbatum

Binomial name
- Bulbophyllum barbatum Barb.Rodr. 1881

= Bulbophyllum barbatum =

Species of orchid

Bulbophyllum barbatum is a species of orchid in the genus Bulbophyllum found in Minas Gerais, Brazil.
