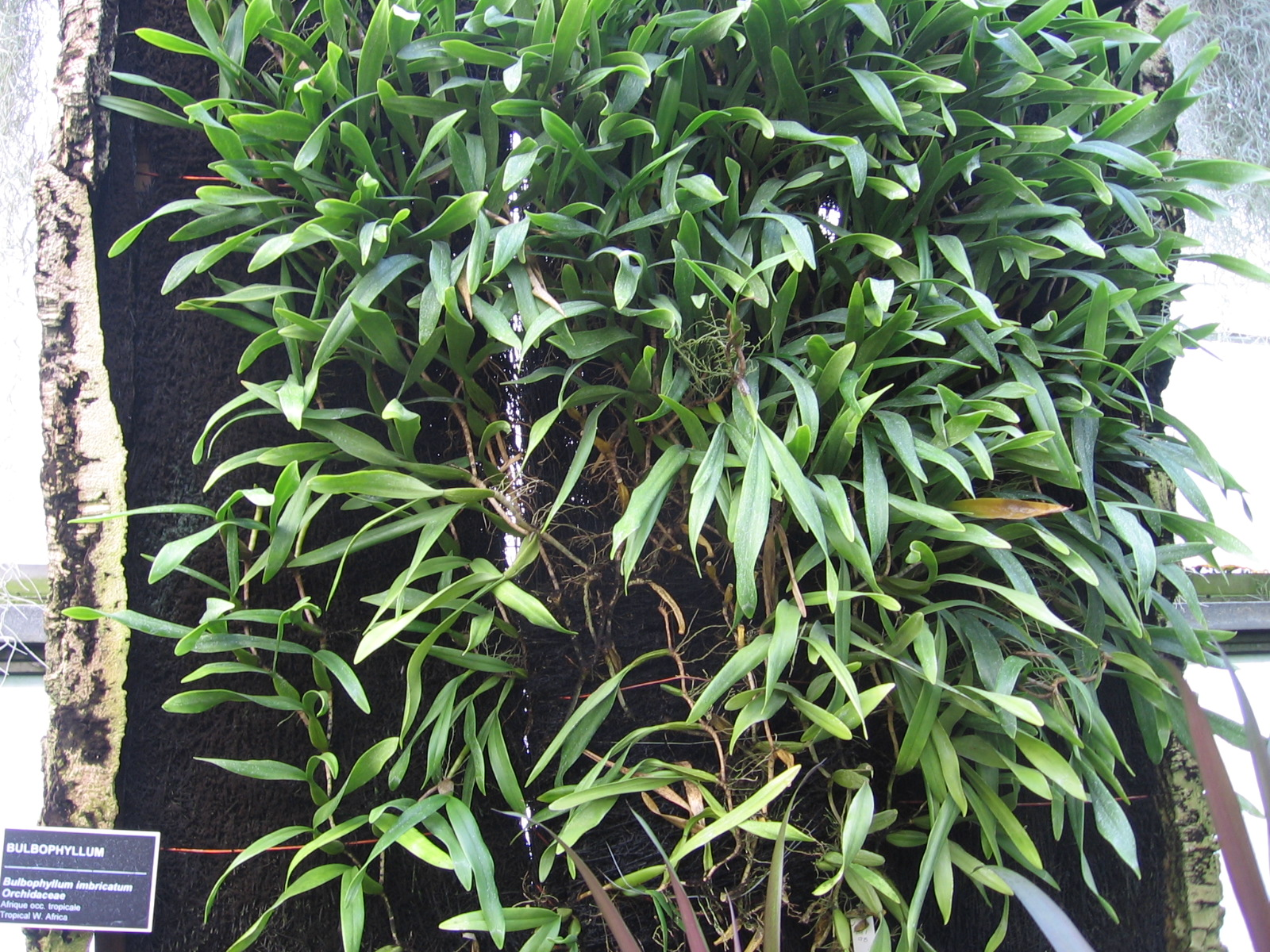

Scientific classification
- Kingdom: Plantae
- Clade: Tracheophytes
- Clade: Angiosperms
- Clade: Monocots
- Order: Asparagales
- Family: Orchidaceae
- Subfamily: Epidendroideae
- Genus: Bulbophyllum
- Species: B. imbricatum

Binomial name
- Bulbophyllum imbricatum Lindl. (1841)

Synonyms
- Bulbophyllum congolense (De Wild.) De Wild. (1921); Bulbophyllum gilletii (De Wild.) De Wild. (1921); Bulbophyllum kamerunense Schltr. (1905); Bulbophyllum laurentianum Kraenzl. ex De Wild. & T. Durand (1899); Bulbophyllum ledermannii (Kraenzl.) De Wild. (1921); Bulbophyllum leucorhachis (Rolfe) Schltr. (1905); Bulbophyllum linderi Summerh. (1935; Bulbophyllum stenorhachis Kraenzl. (1895); Bulbophyllum strobiliferum Kraenzl. (1889); Megaclinium congolense De Wild. (1903); Megaclinium gilletii De Wild. (1903); Megaclinium gillianum De Wild. (1903); Megaclinium hebetatum Kraenzl. (1923); Megaclinium imbricatum (Lindl.) Rolfe (1897; Megaclinium laurentianum (Kraenzl. ex De Wild. & T.Durand) De Wild. (1903); Megaclinium ledermannii Kraenzl., (1912); Megaclinium leucorhachis Rolfe (1891); Megaclinium strobiliferum (Kraenzl.) Rolfe (1897); Phyllorkis imbricata (Lindl.) Kuntze (1891)

= Bulbophyllum imbricatum =

Imbricate bulbophyllum

Species of orchid

Bulbophyllum imbricatum (imbricate bulbophyllum) is a species of orchid.
