= Bulbophyllum arianeae =

Scientific classification
- Kingdom: Plantae
- Clade: Tracheophytes
- Clade: Angiosperms
- Clade: Monocots
- Order: Asparagales
- Family: Orchidaceae
- Subfamily: Epidendroideae
- Genus: Bulbophyllum
- Species: B. arianeae

Binomial name
- Bulbophyllum arianeae Fraga & E.C.Smidt 2004

Species of orchid

Bulbophyllum arianeae is a species of orchid in the genus Bulbophyllum found in Espirito Santo, Brazil.
