= Bulbophyllum luciphilum =

Scientific classification
- Kingdom: Plantae
- Clade: Tracheophytes
- Clade: Angiosperms
- Clade: Monocots
- Order: Asparagales
- Family: Orchidaceae
- Subfamily: Epidendroideae
- Genus: Bulbophyllum
- Species: B. luciphilum

Binomial name
- Bulbophyllum luciphilum Stevart 2000

Species of orchid

Bulbophyllum luciphilum is a species of orchid in the genus Bulbophyllum found in São Tomé at elevations of 1000 meters.
