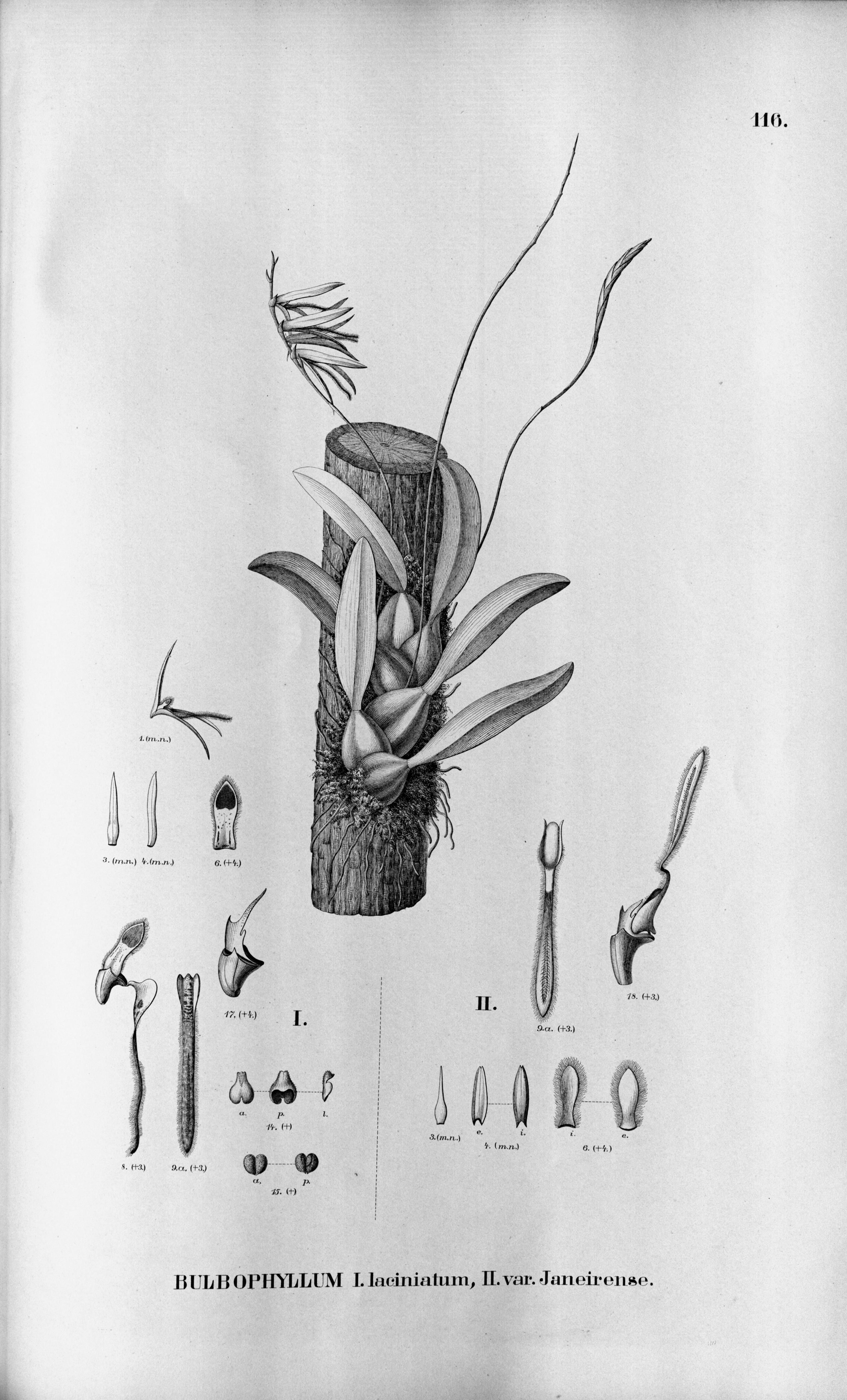

Scientific classification
- Kingdom: Plantae
- Clade: Tracheophytes
- Clade: Angiosperms
- Clade: Monocots
- Order: Asparagales
- Family: Orchidaceae
- Subfamily: Epidendroideae
- Genus: Bulbophyllum
- Species: B. laciniatum

Binomial name
- Bulbophyllum laciniatum (Barb. Rodr.) Cogn.

= Bulbophyllum laciniatum =

Species of orchid

Bulbophyllum laciniatum is a species of orchid in the genus Bulbophyllum.
