= Bulbophyllum filifolium =

Scientific classification
- Kingdom: Plantae
- Clade: Tracheophytes
- Clade: Angiosperms
- Clade: Monocots
- Order: Asparagales
- Family: Orchidaceae
- Subfamily: Epidendroideae
- Genus: Bulbophyllum
- Species: B. filifolium

Binomial name
- Bulbophyllum filifolium Borba & E. C. Smidt 2004

Species of orchid

Bulbophyllum filifolium is a species of orchid in the genus Bulbophyllum found in Minas Gerais, Brazil.
