= Friedrich Wilhelm Ludwig Kraenzlin =

German botanist

Friedrich Wilhelm Ludwig Kraenzlin (aka Kränzlin; 25 July 1847 – 9 March 1934) was a botanist associated with the Natural History Museum (BM).

In the history of the European study of South African orchids, Friedrich "Fritz" Kraenzlin (Kränzlin) appears after Heinrich Gustav Reichenbach describing many new orchids in the region, and revising some of the genera. His book Orchidacearum Genera et Species was never finished, but the volume containing the Habenaria, Disa, and Disperis genera was completed in 1901.

== Publications ==
- Reichenbach, H. G. & Kraenzlin, W. L.: Xenia Orchidacea. Beiträge zur Kenntniss der Orchideen
- Pfitzer, Ernst Hugo Heinrich; Kraenzlin, Friedrich Wilhelm Ludwig (1907). Orchidaceae Monandrae - Coelogyninae. Archived from the original (PDF) on 9 May 2008. "Courtesy of the Botanical Garden Real, Spain - Digital Library"
- Pfitzer, Ernst Hugo Heinrich; Kraenzlin, Friedrich Wilhelm Ludwig (1907). Orchidaceae Monandrae - Thelasinae. Archived from the original (PDF) on 9 May 2008. "Courtesy of the Botanical Garden Real, Spain - Digital Library"
- Kraenzlin, Friedrich Wilhelm Ludwig. Das Pflanzenreich. Regni vegetabilis conspectus. Im Auftrage der Preuss. Akademie der Wissenschaften / herausgegeben von A. Engler; [Heft 83] IV. 50. Orchidaceae-Monandrae-Pseudomonopodiales mit 101 Einzelbildern in 5 Figuren / von Fr. Kränzlin. Leipzig : Verlag von Wilhelm Engelmann (Druck von Breitkopf & Härtel in Leipzig).

== See also ==
- Taxa named by Friedrich Ludwig Kraenzlin
