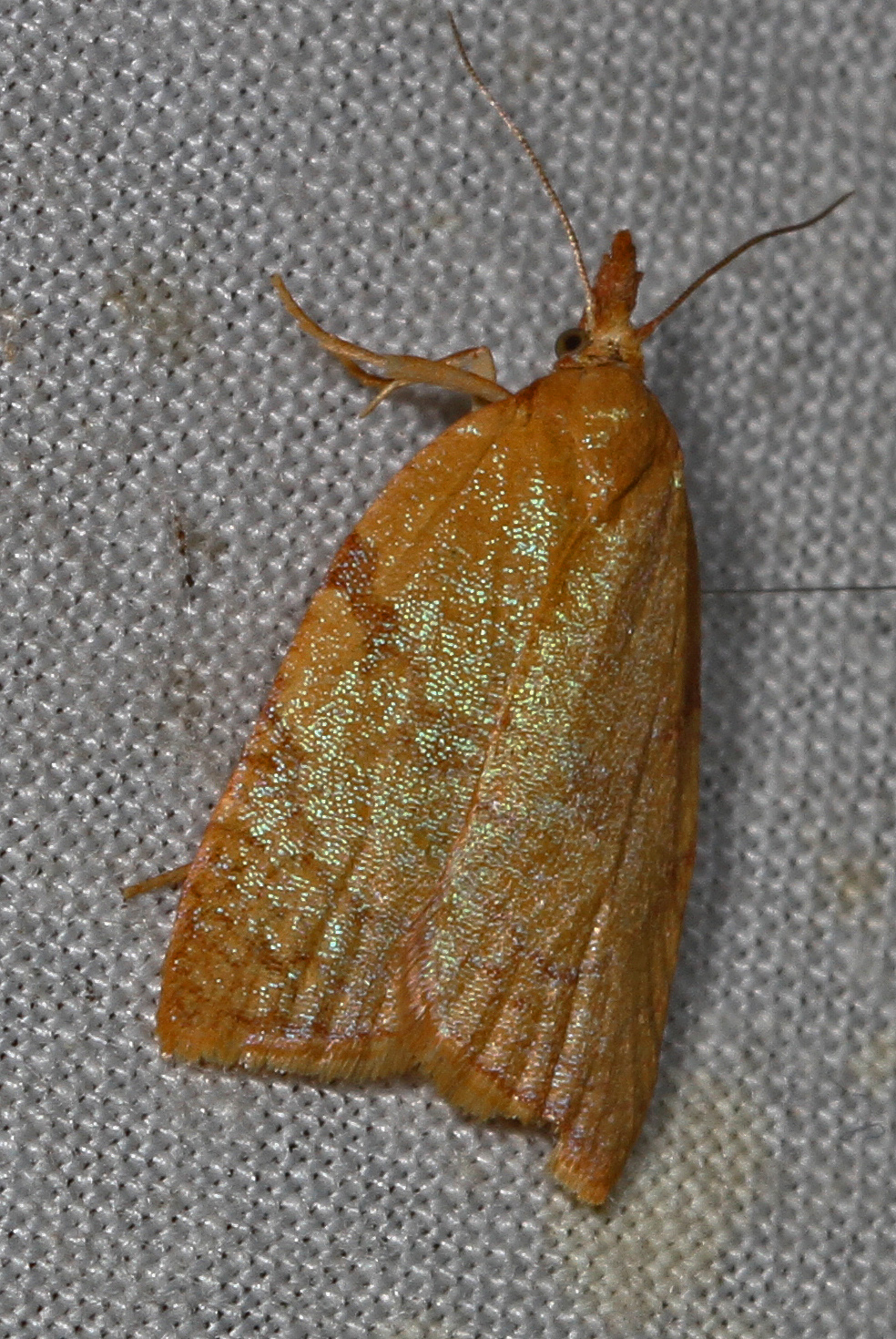

Scientific classification
- Kingdom: Animalia
- Phylum: Arthropoda
- Class: Insecta
- Order: Lepidoptera
- Family: Tortricidae
- Genus: Sparganothis
- Species: S. senecionana

Binomial name
- Sparganothis senecionana (Walsingham, 1879)

Synonyms
- Oenectra senecionana Walsingham, 1879; Oenectra rudana Walsingham, 1879

= Sparganothis senecionana =

Species of moth

Sparganothis senecionana is a moth species in the family Tortricidae. It is found in western North America, ranging from British Columbia to Mexico and eastward to Colorado.

The forewings measure 7.5-12.5 mm in length and are pale yellow with brown to purplish-brown markings. Adults are active from April to August with one generation per year.

The larvae feed on a wide range of plants. They have been recorded feeding on Brodiaea species, Lomatium californicum, Achillea species (including Achillea milleflorum), Anaphalis margaritacea, Artemisia douglasiana, Balsamorhiza sagittata, Gnaphalium species, Hieracium scouleri, Senecio species (including Senecio integerrimus), Wyethia species, Cynoglossum grande, Horkelia species (including Horkelia californica and Horkelia fusca), Barbarea orthoceras, Hypericum perforatum, Cornus species, Lupinus albifrons, Thermopsis macrophylla, Eriodictyon californicum, Phacelia californica, Phacelia hastata, Iris species, Stachys rigida, Chlorogalum pomeridianum, Zigadenus paniculatus, Chlorogalum species, Clarkia species, Abies species (including Abies magnifica and Abies concolor), Pseudotsuga menziesii, Dodecatheon hendersonii, Ceanothus papillosus, Cercocarpus montanus, Prunus species (including Prunus virginiana), Castilleja applegatei and Penstemon species (including Penstemon deustus, Penstemon newberryi and Penstemon speciosus). They generally feed on the flowers of their host plant.
