= Domestication of Ficus carica =

One of the earliest plants to be domesticated

Ficus carica, known as the common fig, is one of the earliest plants to have ever undergone domestication. Ficus carica played many important roles in history and has become a symbol in many cultures and religions.

== Origins of cultivation and domestication ==
The origin of the common fig is debated. Some believe it to be indigenous to Western Asia and then spread by human activity throughout the Mediterranean. Despite uncertainty about its geographic origins, most archaeobotanists agree that the domestication of the fig tree occurred around 6500 years ago in the Near East. Scholars agree that the domestication of the fig tree came long before the domestication of other fruit crops like grapes, olives, and dates.

Researchers have found significant evidence of fig cultivation at many late Neolithic and Neolithic sites along with Bronze Age, Assyrian, and Egyptian sites. But evidence for the first cultivation of figs has been found in the Lower Jordan Valley in an early Neolithic village known as Gilgal 1. This evidence dates back to approximately 10,000 BCE and suggests that the widespread cultivation of figs pre-dated the domestication of cereal crops by almost one thousand years.

Ficus carica specimens made ideal candidates for domestication because they are one of the most easily proliferated of all fruit trees. By simply planting a seed, or by cutting off either a limb of the fig tree or a part the fruit itself may result in an entirely new individual tree. The ability to produce many more plants in such a straightforward manner may have appealed to the early consumers of figs, as would the fruit's ability to withstand harsh, varying temperatures. Along with their rigidity, Ficus carica trees produce 3 crops throughout the year, so the yield from these plants would be significantly worth the effort put into growing them. Figs also contain a large amount of sugar. Perhaps the sweetness of these fruits also played a role in their domestication, as it would have made them more desirable to the human palate.

During the domestication of fig trees, humans compromised the characteristics of the fruit and promoted evolutionary divergence from the wild ancestor of the plant. Intuitively, those growing the figs chose to let the plants with the most desirable characteristics reproduce. In this case, plants were selected towards an increase in the size of the overall fruit. Figs with various flesh colors were also chosen so that there are now white-, amber-, red-, and purple-colored figs. The plants that produced the sweetest fruit were also selected, increasing the sugar content of the domesticated fig versus the wild fig. Those plants that produced fruits that did not split during maturation and harvest were considered ideal because they produced a higher, usable, crop yield with more diverse uses, being less fragile and easier to handle.

== Smyrna figs ==
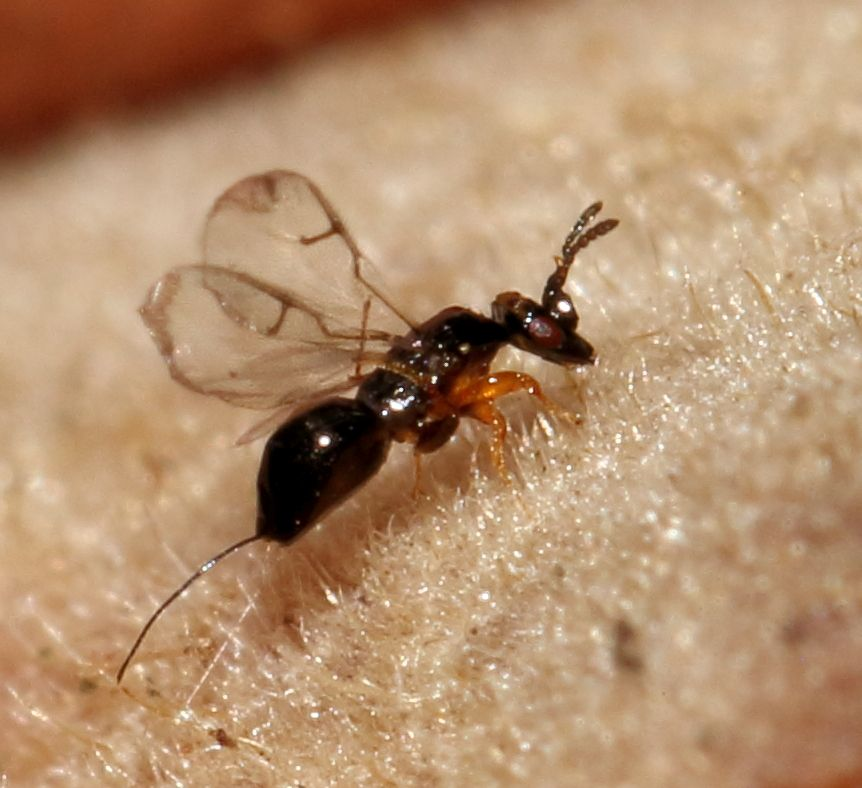
Fig wasp

Smyrna figs need to be pollinated by a fig wasp, in contrast to more domesticated forms of Ficus carica such as 'Brown Turkey', which can form figs without pollination (parthenogenetically).

Figs and fig wasps have had a symbiotic relationship throughout history. The fig wasps need the figs in order to reproduce, while the figs rely on the wasps to aid them in their pollination. In wilder forms of the plant, without pollination the young developing fig will fall off of the tree without ripening. To secure their crop, fig farmers around the Mediterranean help in the caprification (the process of fig pollination). This process is done by buying male figs from different regions that are already filled with fig wasps. They then string these figs together and hang them in their trees. When the fig wasps emerge, they pollinate the figs and allow them to mature. In this way, figs are reliant on human activities, which is representative of their domestication. Without human interference, they would not likely reach maturity.

In the years prior to the 1900s, a problem arose for those who grew Smyrna figs outside of the Mediterranean. Fig wasps were only found in a very small portion of the world and there was no other known way to pollinate figs. In artificial caprification, the maturation of the figs is completely reliant on humans; fig wasps are entirely absent. Male figs are broken open, releasing their pollen. Toothpicks dusted with this pollen is then poked them into female figs, thus artificially pollinating them and allowing them to reach maturity. This process of artificial caprification was vital to the culture of figs in California until fig wasps were eventually imported into the state from Turkey. In this case, without the close interaction with humans, these figs would have never succeeded in this part of the world.

== Historical significance ==
Fig trees and fig fruits have many historical and cultural references. In art, fig leaves have been used to cover the sexual characteristics of muse, forming a representation of modesty and vulnerability. There are also many references to figs within the Bible. One example being, when Adam and Eve dress themselves with fig leaves after eating the forbidden fruit. Perhaps this suggesting that the leaves serve as some form of protection. In another section of the Bible Jesus curses a fig tree. They are also present in different aspects of Greek mythology. They are, for example, known as the sacred tree to the god Dionysus, god of wine and fertility. They appear within a portion of the Qur'an that is titled "The Fig" in Arabic. It can also be found in another section of the Qur'an, in which the fig is referred to as "a fruit that descended from paradise". In Rome, figs were thought to represent femininity, due to the appearance of the fleshy inside of the fruit. In this society, figs were meant as a way of presenting weakness. In the sense, they appeared in a much more negative light than in other cultural contexts.

== Dispersal ==
As time went on, figs were spread from their indigenous region of Western Asia, and their comfortable home in the Mediterranean, throughout many other places around the world (of course, despite their increasing ability to grow in many regions, the Mediterranean still remains the ideal location for the raising of figs). They migrated into Afghanistan and expanded to southern Germany and the Canary Islands. They made their way to England and then China, and eventually to Japan, South Africa, India, Australia, the United States (California to be more specific), and of course many other places around the globe. Figs soon found themselves woven into the economy of many countries. The production, import, and export of figs is vital in some regions. For example, in 2010, Turkey was the number one exporter and producer of figs in the world, producing around 24% of the world's supply and exporting around 254, 838 metric tons. Egypt was the second largest producer, producing around 184,972 metric tons. Austria trailed Turkey as the second largest exporter, exporting somewhere near 6,131 metric tons. In 2009, France, Austria, and Germany were the top 3 importers of figs, with Canada trailing as number 4. The demand for figs has remained steady for many years and it looks as though it will stay that way for a while, or perhaps even increase, which would of course be good news for the countries that lead in the fig trade.

== Modern uses ==
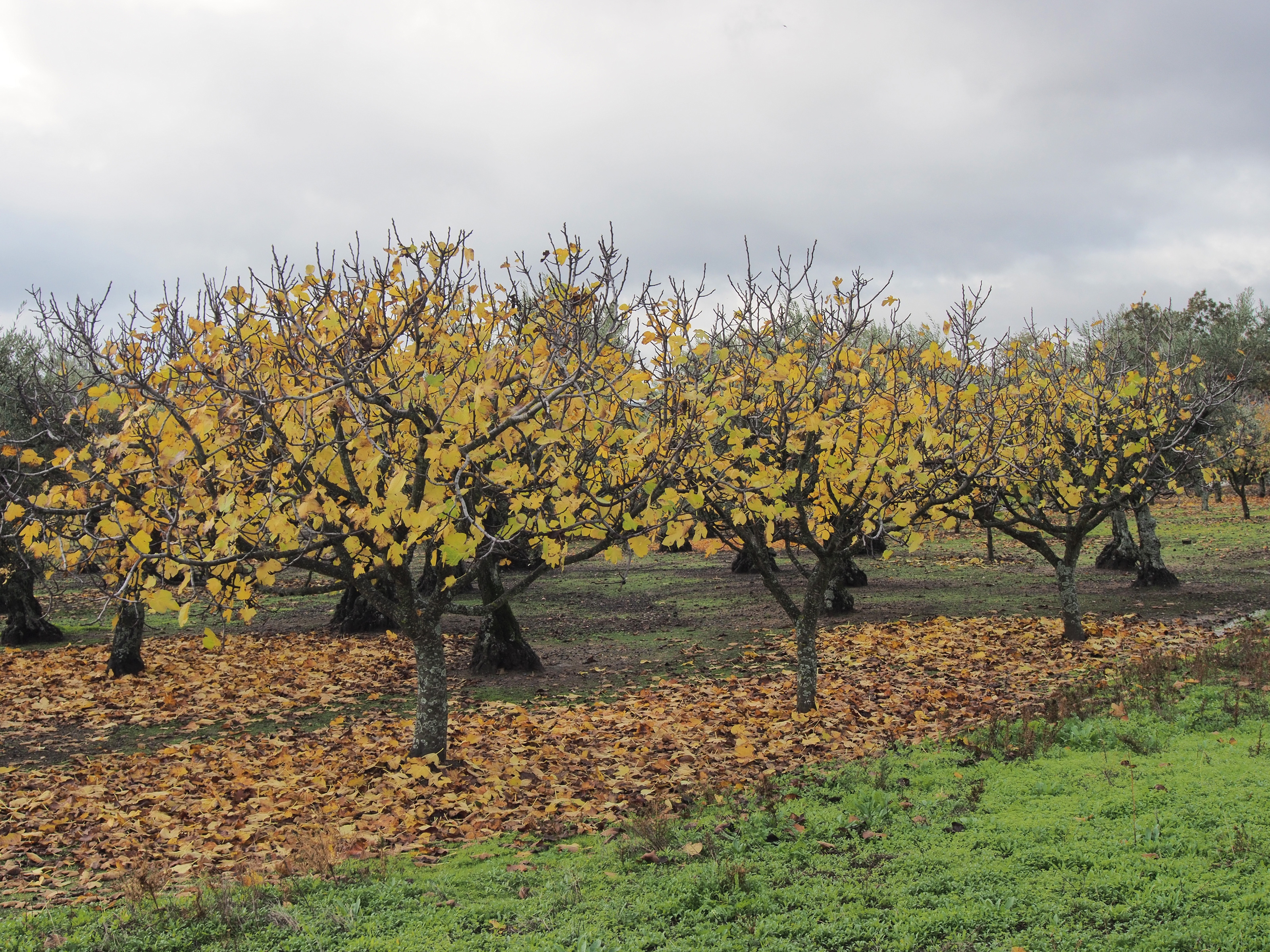
Spanish fig orchard in 2019

There are many ways that people continue to consume fig fruits today. The most common forms of consumption are either dried, sliced, and then eaten, or dried and then made into a sticky paste which can then be used in a variety of products. This is mostly because it is extremely hard to keep fresh figs, as they spoil within a very short amount of time. So, more often than not, if figs are to be consumed fresh then they must be eaten in the place which they are grown because they are unable to make the journey of exportation. It is for this reason that, for most of their history, around 95% of all the figs produced in the world were destined to be dried. However, despite the difficulties that they pose, the demand for fresh figs has recently greatly increased. From 2002 to 2006, the demand for fresh figs increased four-fold. Besides dried or fresh, figs are also sometimes canned and used in pastries and, although it is not commonly known, they can even be fermented and distilled into alcohol. It many places in the world, it is common to grind up the figs that either do not meet standards, or rot before they can be consumed, in order to make a sort of animal feed.

== See also ==
- Reproductive coevolution in Ficus
