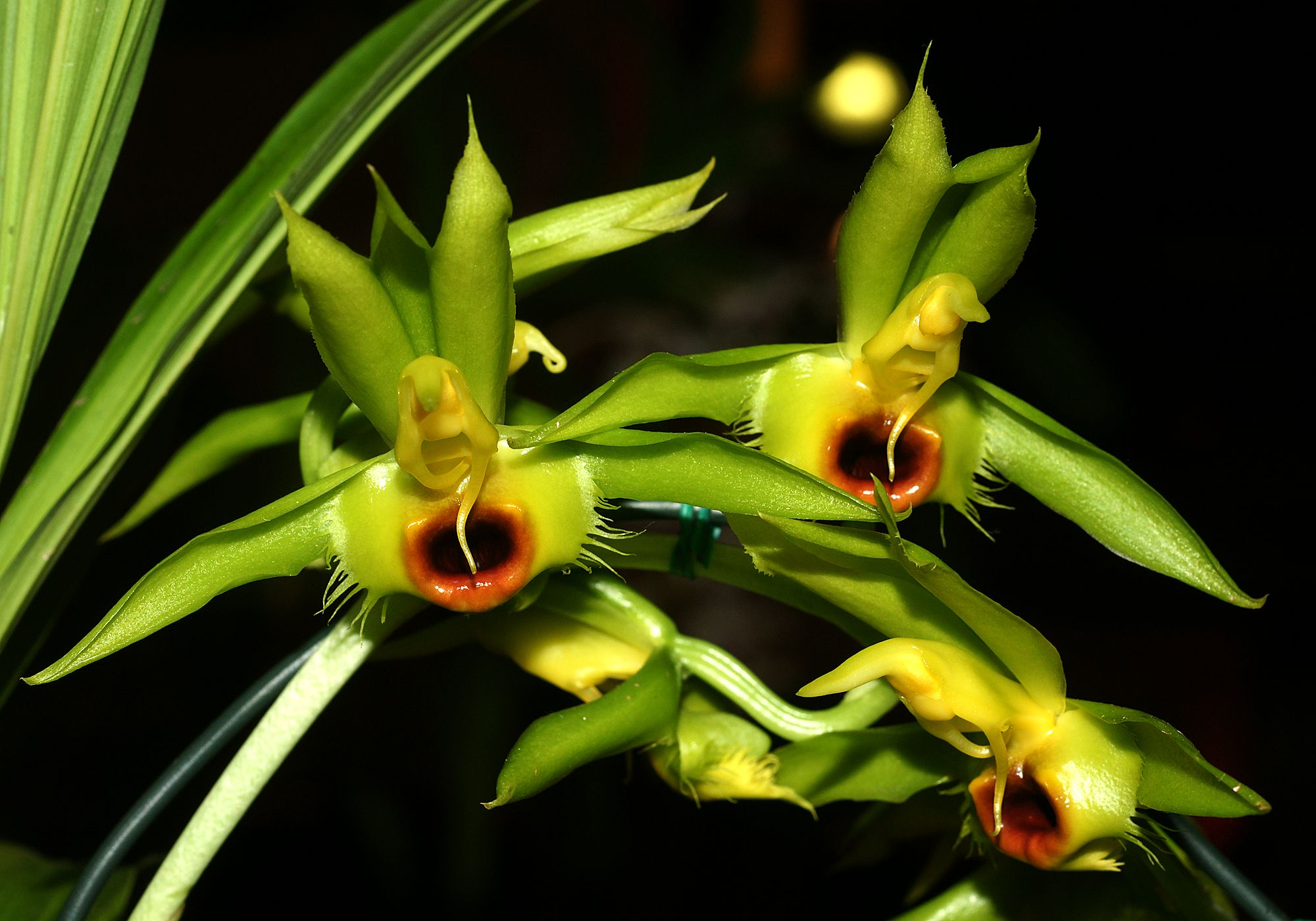

Scientific classification
- Kingdom: Plantae
- Clade: Tracheophytes
- Clade: Angiosperms
- Clade: Monocots
- Order: Asparagales
- Family: Orchidaceae
- Subfamily: Epidendroideae
- Genus: Catasetum
- Species: C. osculatum

Binomial name
- Catasetum osculatum K.G.Lacerda & V.P.Castro (1995)
- The distribution of the Catasetum osculatum

Synonyms
- Catasetum saccatum var. christyanum

= Catasetum osculatum =

Species of orchid

Catasetum osculatum, the kissing lips catasetum, is a species of orchid native to Brazil.

Catasetum osculatum used to be considered a variety of Catasetum saccatum, being formerly called Catasetum saccatum var. christyanum.

== Description ==
Its male flowers range from light green to a reddish-brown with darker spots in the sepals, light green to bright yellow with some purple or brown speckles in the petals, lime, yellow, or golden yellow in the main structure while the edge of the hole is a deep burgundy in the labellum (lip), light green to greenish-brown in the column, and light green to brown in the flower stalks (pedicels). While the female flowers are almost entirely green or yellowish-green. Like all the other members of the genus Catasetum, Catasetum osculatum has a catapult trigger mechanism that launches pollinium onto a pollinator once the sensitive antennae are triggered.

== Care ==
Catasetum osculatum is a sun-loving plant that needs around 45000 lux and 50% shade. This species tolerates around 50% humidity but grows best at 70%. It also goes into a leaf-drop state during winter like other Catasetum species.

== Distribution ==
Catasetum osculatum is endemic to Brazil, specifically the states of Rondônia, Mato Grosso, and Mato Grosso do Sul. It grows mainly in gallery forest, usually on palm trees or dead trees between 200 and 500 meters above sea level. Their climate is tropical to subtropical with temperatures ranging from 10 °C (50 °F) to 40 °C (104 °F). Their dry season is long and there is low humidity throughout majority of the year but it still frequently has precipitation.

== Taxonomy and etymology ==
Catasetum osculatum was formally described in Bradea Volume 6, Issue 44, page 381 by K.G.Lacerda & V.P.Castro in 1995 shortly after discovery.
