= Wavyleaf =

Wavyleaf may refer to:

- Wavyleaf basketgrass, an extremely invasive grass
- Wavyleaf Indian paintbrush, a parasitic plant
- Wavyleaf sea-lavender, a herbaceous perennial plant
- Wavyleaf silktassel, a common evergreen shrub
