= Nonecological speciation =

Speciation not driven by divergent natural selection

Distinguishing between ecological and non-ecological speciation involves the identification of specific species traits. Environmental interactions, for example, could consist of adaptations specific to foraging or a unique environment, whereas compatibility in reproduction involves mate-recognition morphology, communication systems, or other behaviors. Ecological speciation necessitates changes in both, whereas non-ecological speciation only changes compatibility in reproduction.

When speciation is not driven by (or strongly correlated with) divergent natural selection, it can be said to be nonecological, to distinguish it from the typical definition of ecological speciation: "It is useful to consider ecological speciation as its own form of species formation because it focuses on an explicit mechanism of speciation: namely divergent natural selection. There are numerous ways other than via divergent natural selection in which populations might become genetically differentiated and reproductively isolated." Many instances of non-ecological speciation are likely allopatric, especially when the organisms in question are poor dispersers (e.g., land snails, salamanders); however, sympatric non-ecological speciation may also be possible, especially when accompanied by an "instant" (at least in evolutionary time) loss of reproductive compatibility, as when polyploidization happens. Other potential mechanisms for non-ecological speciation include mutation-order speciation and changes in chirality in gastropods.

Non-ecological speciation might not be accompanied by strong morphological differentiation, so it might give rise to cryptic species; however, some species are difficult for humans to differentiate that are strongly differentiated concerning their resource use and so are likely a result of ecological speciation (e.g., host shifts in parasites or phytophagous insects). When species recognition/sexual selection plays a strong role in maintaining species boundaries, the species generated by non-ecological speciation might be straightforward for humans to differentiate, as in some odonates.

== See also ==
- Nonadaptive radiation
