= Reproductive coevolution in Ficus =

The genus Ficus is composed of 800 species of vines, shrubs, and trees, defined by their syconiums, the fruit-like vessels that either hold female flowers or pollen on the inside. In addition to being cultivated by humans for thousands of years, Ficus is also known for its reproductive mutualism with the fig wasp.

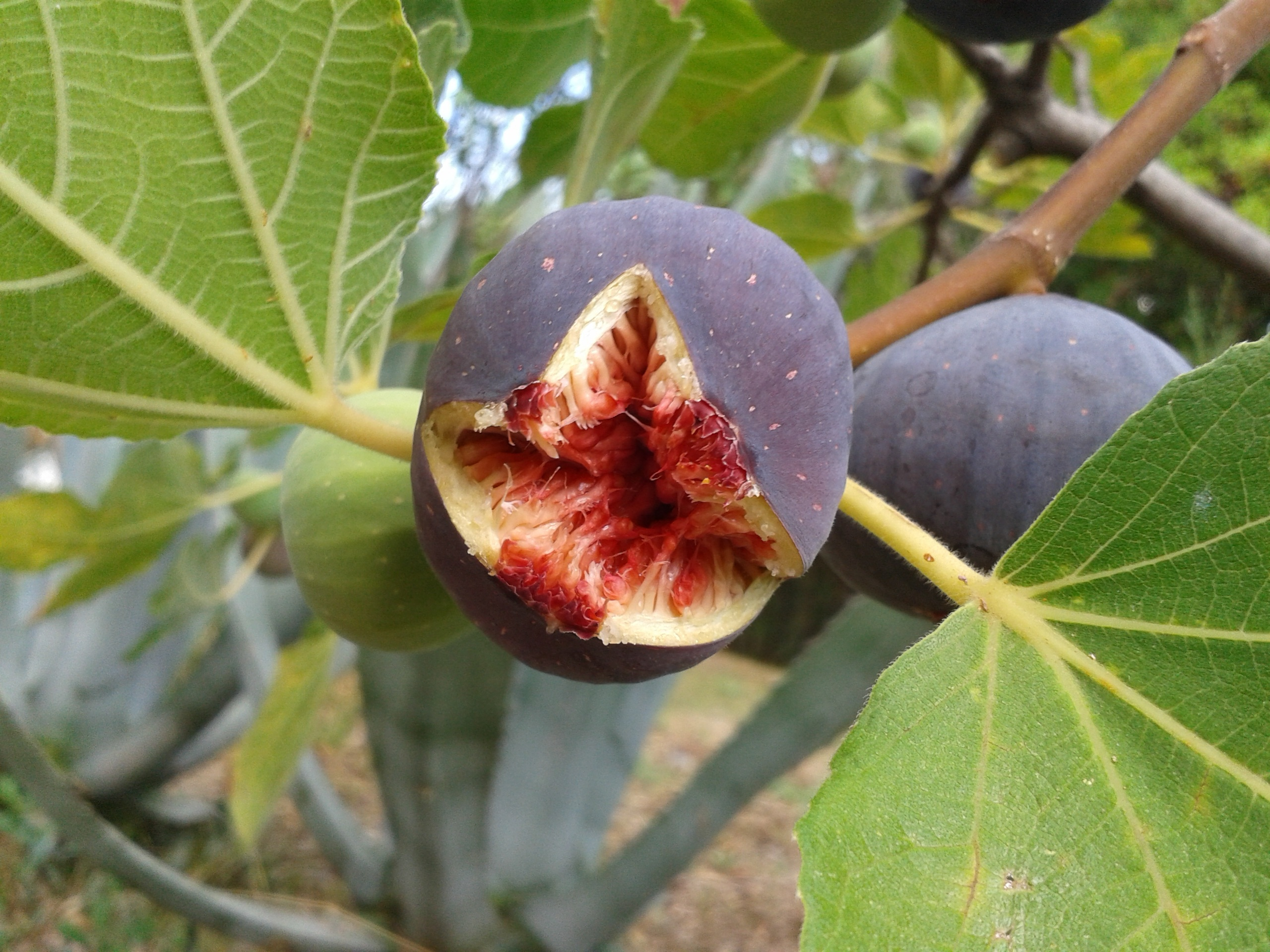
The many tiny matured, seed-bearing gynoecia, seen in an overripe common fig; these are not visible at the time of pollination by the fig wasp, Blastophaga psenes.

Fig trees either produce hermaphrodite fruit (caprifigs) or female figs; only the female figs are palatable to humans. In exchange for a safe place for their eggs and larvae, fig wasps help pollinate the ficus by crawling inside the tiny hole in the apex of the fig, called the ostiole, without knowing whether they crawled into a caprifig or a fig.

If the female wasp crawls into the caprifig, she can successfully lay her eggs and die. The males hatch first, mate with the females, dig tunnels out of the caprifig, and die. The females, now covered in fig pollen from the caprifig, fly out to begin the cycle again. If the female wasp crawls into a female fig, she cannot successfully lay her eggs, despite pollinating the fig with pollen from the caprifig she hatched in. The fig absorbs her body and her eggs as the fruit develops.

== History ==
Aristotle noted in Historia animalium that wild figs contain psenes that begin as grubs, but whose skin splits allowing the psen to fly out. The psen flies into a cultivated fig, and stops it from falling. He noted further that Greek farmers planted wild figs next to cultivated figs, and tied wild fig fruits on to the cultivated trees.

== Mechanisms and outcomes ==
Overall, the coevolution of Ficus and wasps features Ficus being very specific as a host, combined with the tendency of the wasp species to frequent plant species different from that of their specific Ficus host.

=== Ficus domination in mutualism ===
Ficus typically control the reproductive mutualism with fig wasps by being highly selective in their choice of pollinator. This high host specificity is proven by the low pollinator sharing ratios found in fig pollinators, especially in the wasp genera Ceratosolen and Kradibia. Contributing to the evolution of Ficus, pollinator specificity in Ficus is a pre-zygotic mechanism of reproductive isolation, in other words, the fig can control which pollen it gets by physically controlling which wasps pollinate it. Morphologically, one way the fig can specify the pollinator it wants includes the diameters of ostioles compared to the head widths of the respective wasp species. While the fig species F. wassa have a diameter of 1.0-1.5 mm, its pollinator K. wassae had an average head width of 0.58 mm.

=== Pollinator sharing ===
Mutualism between figs and their wasps is not always strictly one on one: in Neotropical monoecious Ficus (among a few examples with the genus Ficus alone), different plant species may share the same species of pollinator wasp, and in a number of Ficus species, a few species of wasps are able to pollinate the figs (to various degrees) of a single fig species.

Clearly, sharing of pollinators could allow interspecific hybrids to occur more easily, which would threaten the integrity of specific species of both plant or wasp, or allow new species to develop from the hybrids. Hybridization does not appear to have played a major role in the evolution of fig and pollinator lineages, based on a maximum likelihood test on 1991 data. In Panama, pollinator and host sharing have led to hybridization in figs, but not in their wasps.

Sharing of pollinators has implications for the evolutionary history of the fig-wasp mutualism, because this means specific wasps may have switched hosts, perhaps to new fig species rather unrelated to the original host species -this, along with possible hybridization, can thus mean that the phylogenies of the figs and their wasp pollinators do not strictly correspond one to one. Due to this shifting of hosts, wasp species which share the same fig species as hosts may not be sister species, but quite unrelated. The process whereby pollinating wasps switch fig host species, known as a host switch, has been identified as an important process in leading to coevolutionary patterns in a community of strangler figs and pollinating wasps in Panama.

Another possibility is the evolution of cheating. Where a single fig species is able to use multiple wasp species to pollinate itself, and some wasp species may be better at this than others, a certain wasp species may not need to end up evolving to become a better pollinator, as opposed to simply using the fig as a brood chamber. Wasp species which share the same fig species compete for resources. Where wasp species may visit numerous hosts, if one fig species evolves to be a better host, the wasp may shift hosts, rendering its other shared fig hosts incidentally visited, and thus improperly pollinated, and the wasp a 'cheat' when it visits them.

=== Cospeciation ===
Cospeciation, where the evolution of one of a pair (or more) of species is influenced by the evolution of the other of the pair, appears to have occurred in the history of the Ficus-wasp mutualism, despite some significant differences in the fig and pollinator phylogenies.

=== Cryptic wasp species ===
Complicating the identification of fig-wasp relationships is the existence of cryptic species: some groups of wasps are morphologically similar, but genetic markers show that they have been functioning as independent species that have not interbred for millions of years.
