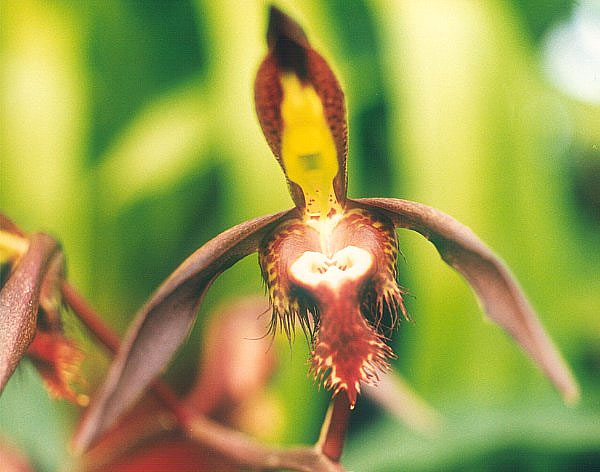

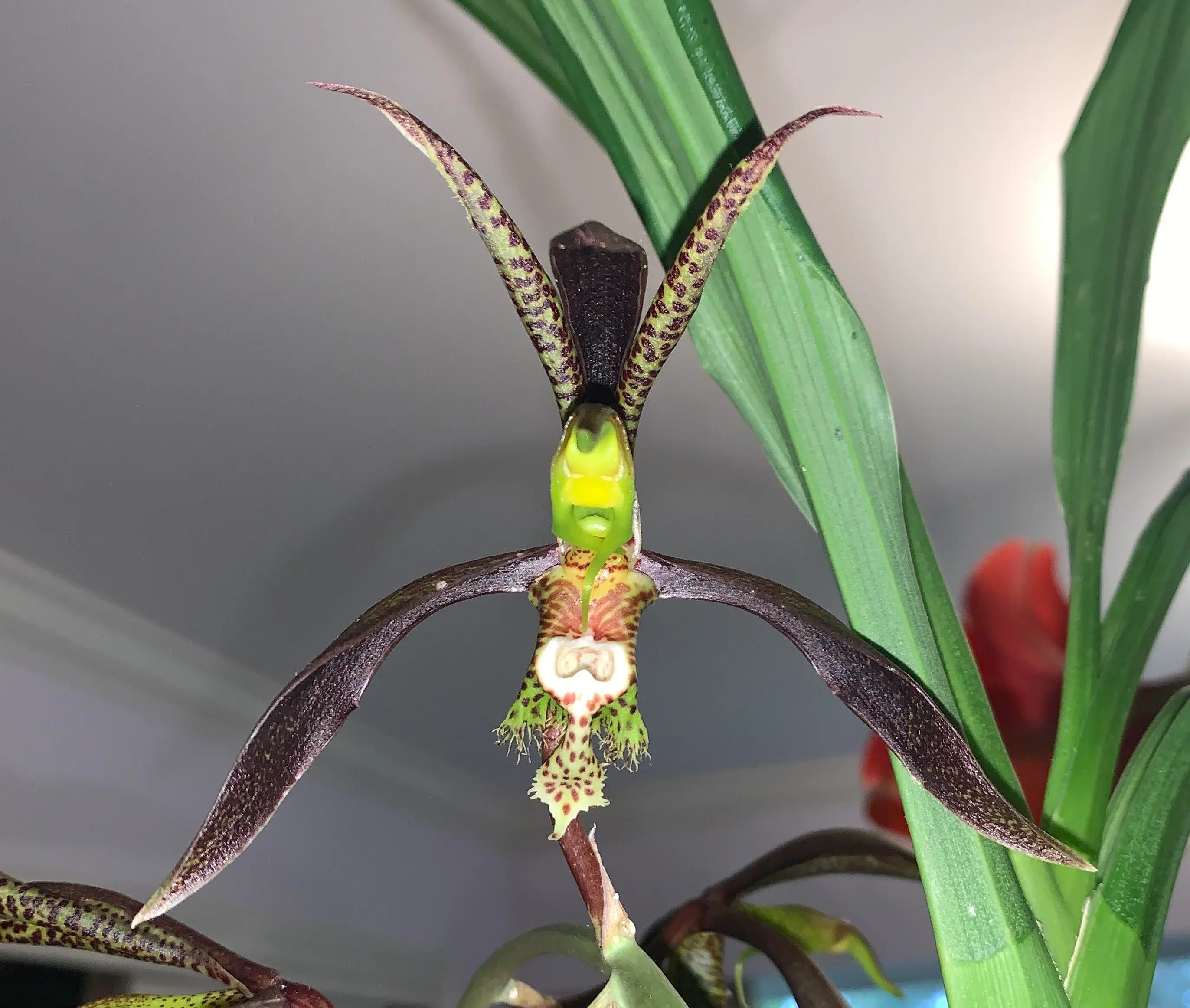
- Petals detached from the dorsal sepals

Scientific classification
- Kingdom: Plantae
- Clade: Tracheophytes
- Clade: Angiosperms
- Clade: Monocots
- Order: Asparagales
- Family: Orchidaceae
- Subfamily: Epidendroideae
- Genus: Catasetum
- Species: C. saccatum

Binomial name
- Catasetum saccatum Lindl.

Synonyms
- Catasetum saccatum var. eusaccatum Mansf.; Catasetum saccatum var. typum Hoehne; Catasetum christyanum var. obscurum Rchb.f.; Catasetum secundum Klotzsch; Catasetum baraquinianum Lem.; Catasetum saccatum var. pliciferum Rchb.f.; Catasetum christyanum Rchb.f.; Catasetum christyanum var. chlorops Rchb.f.; Catasetum cruciatum Schltr.; Catasetum saccatum var. christyanum (Rchb.f.) Mansf.

= Catasetum saccatum =

Species of orchid

Catasetum saccatum, the sack-shaped catasetum, is a species of orchid.

Charles Darwin remarked on the ability of the species to launch its viscid pollen sacs with explosive force, when an insect touches a seta. He was ridiculed for reporting this by the naturalist Thomas Huxley.

== Gallery ==
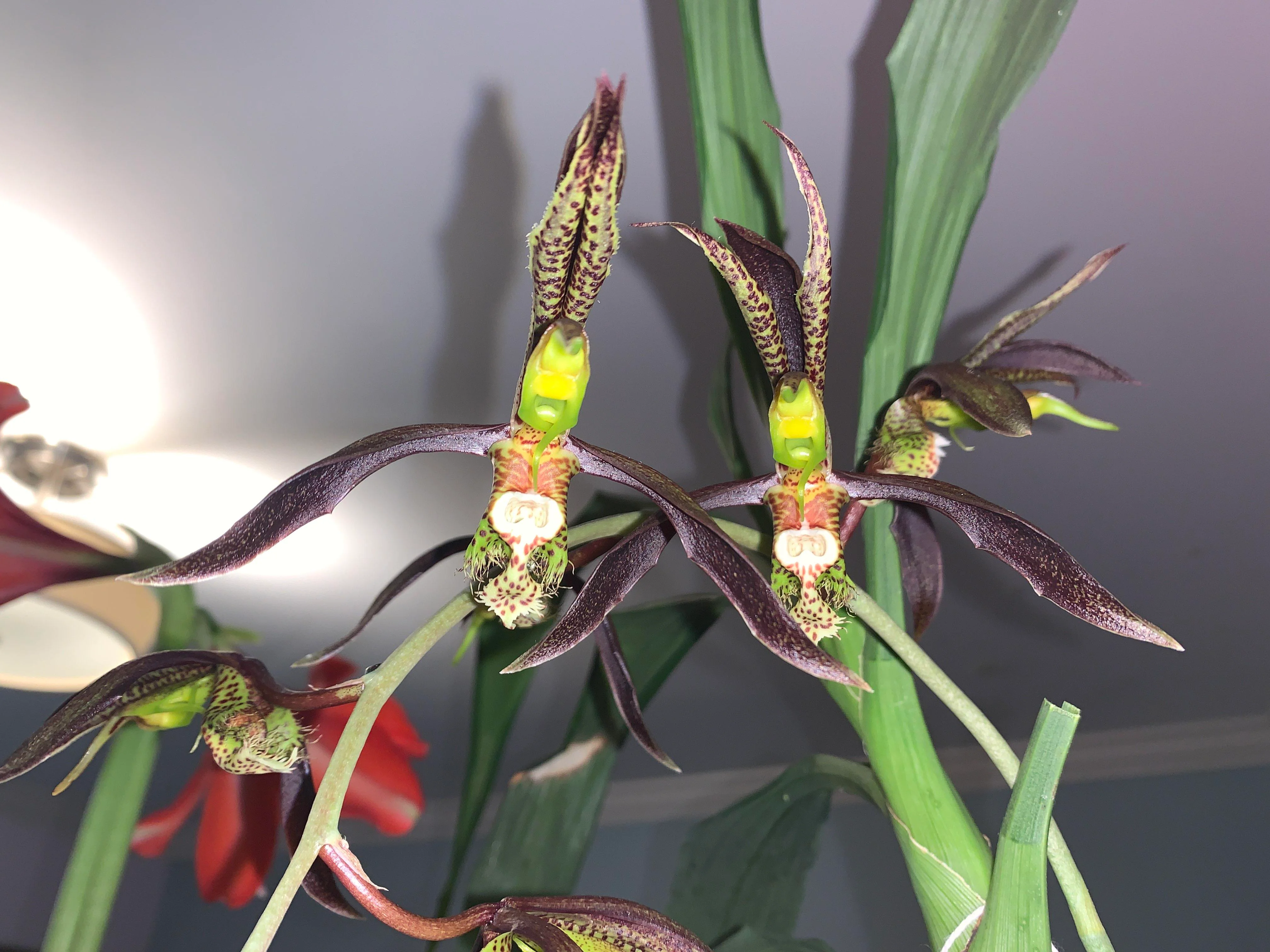

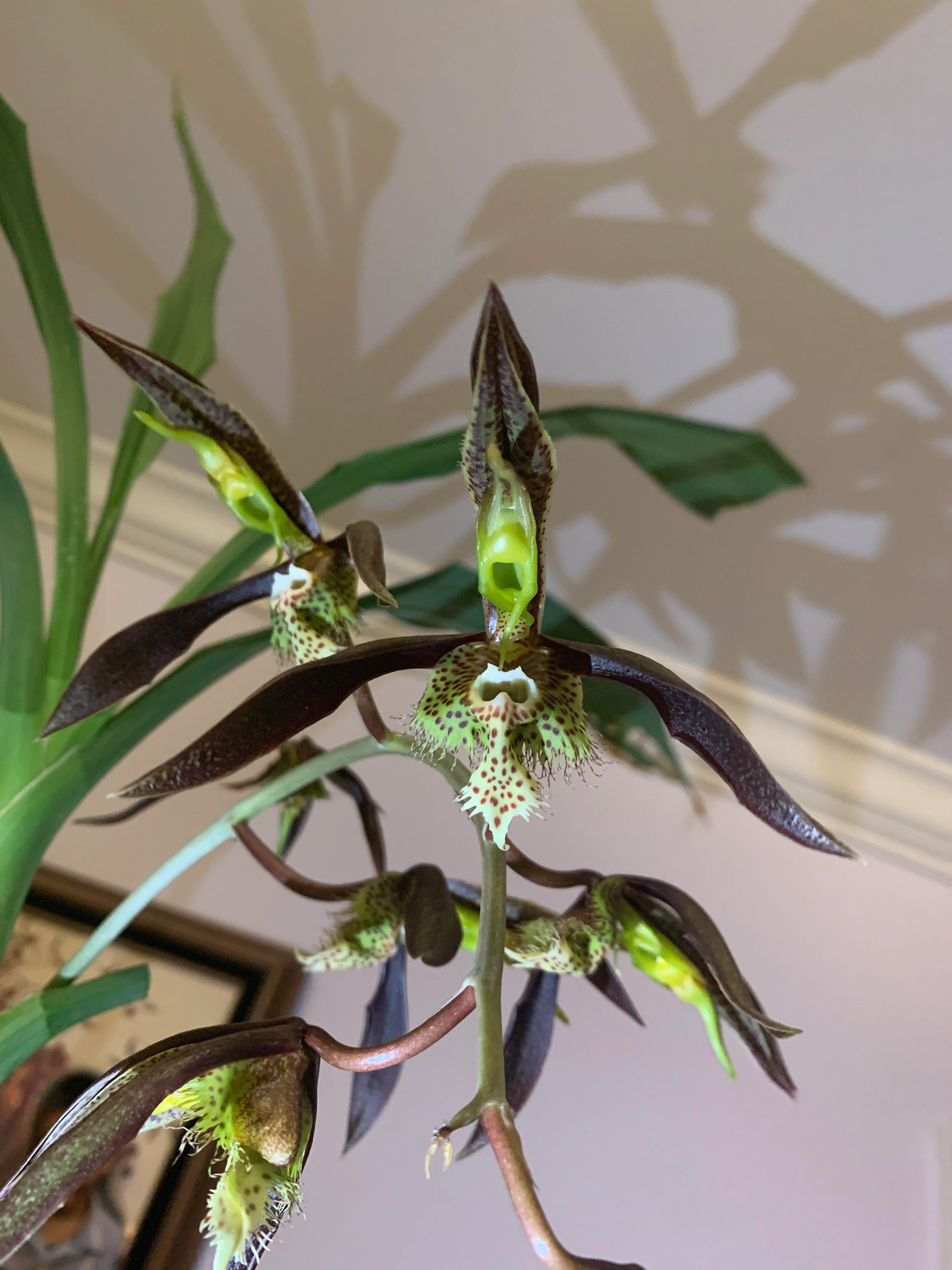

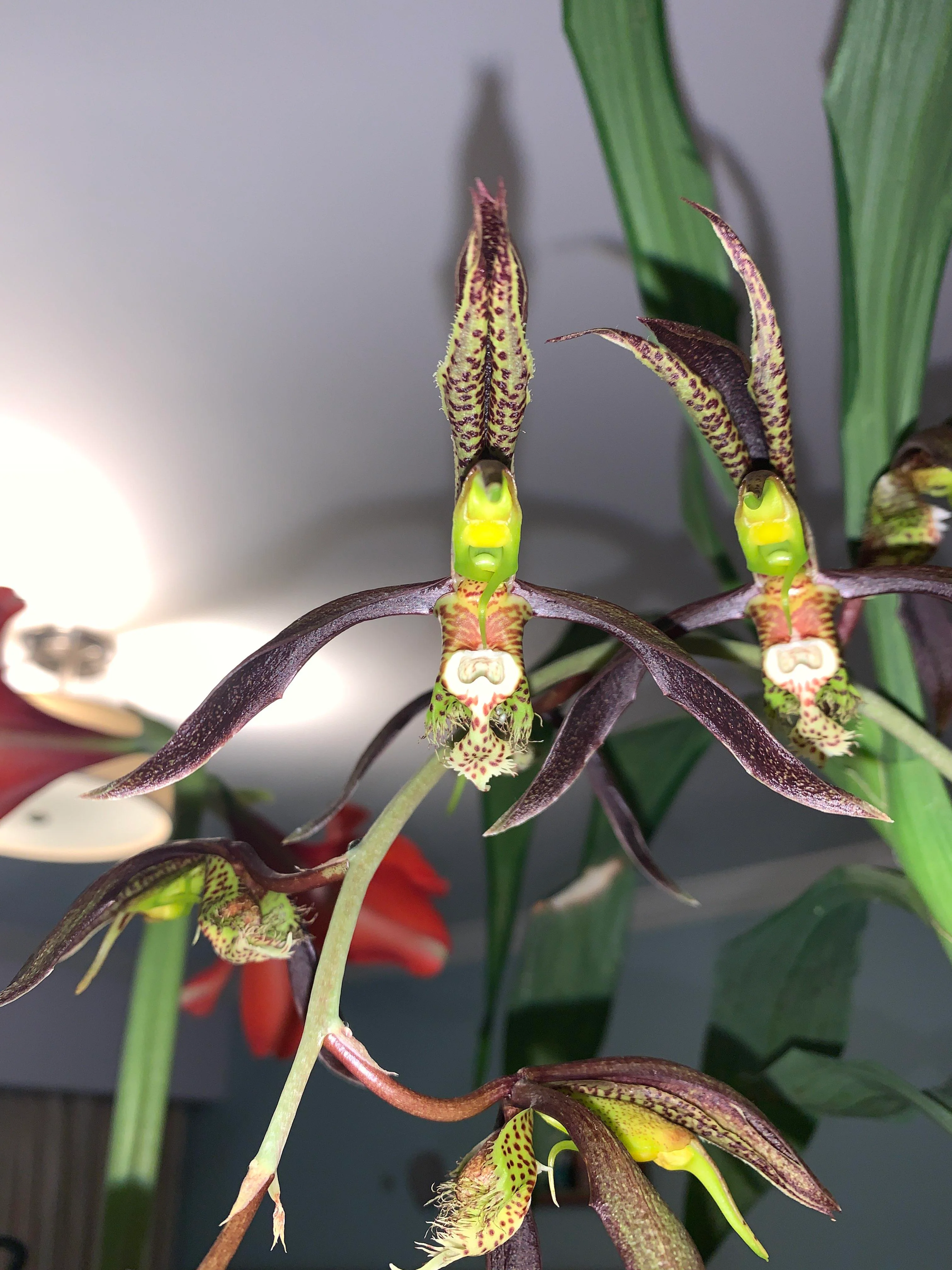

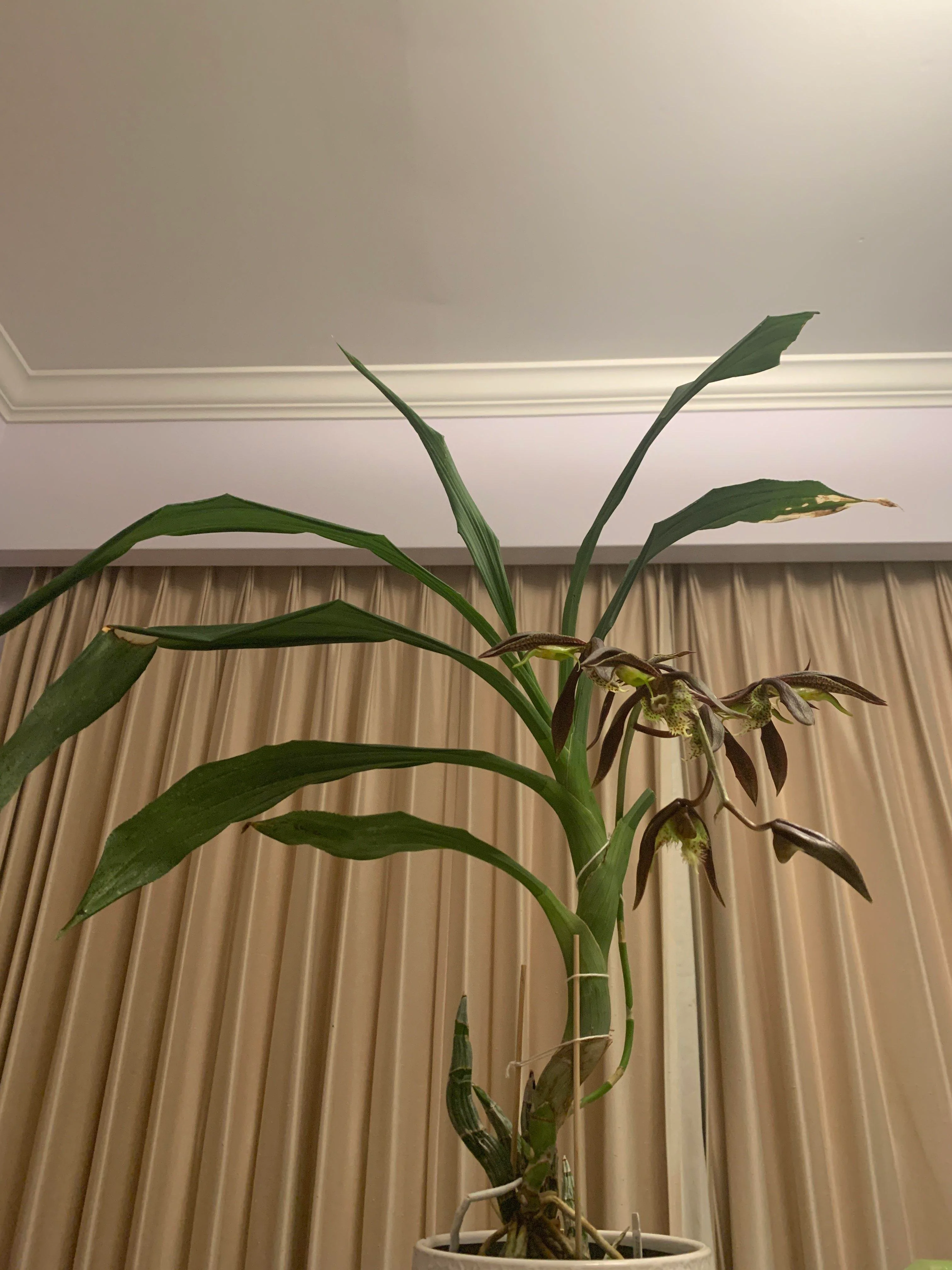
Pseudobulbs

Eulaema cingulata orchid bee showing pollinia attachment points of C. saccatum and C. discolor.

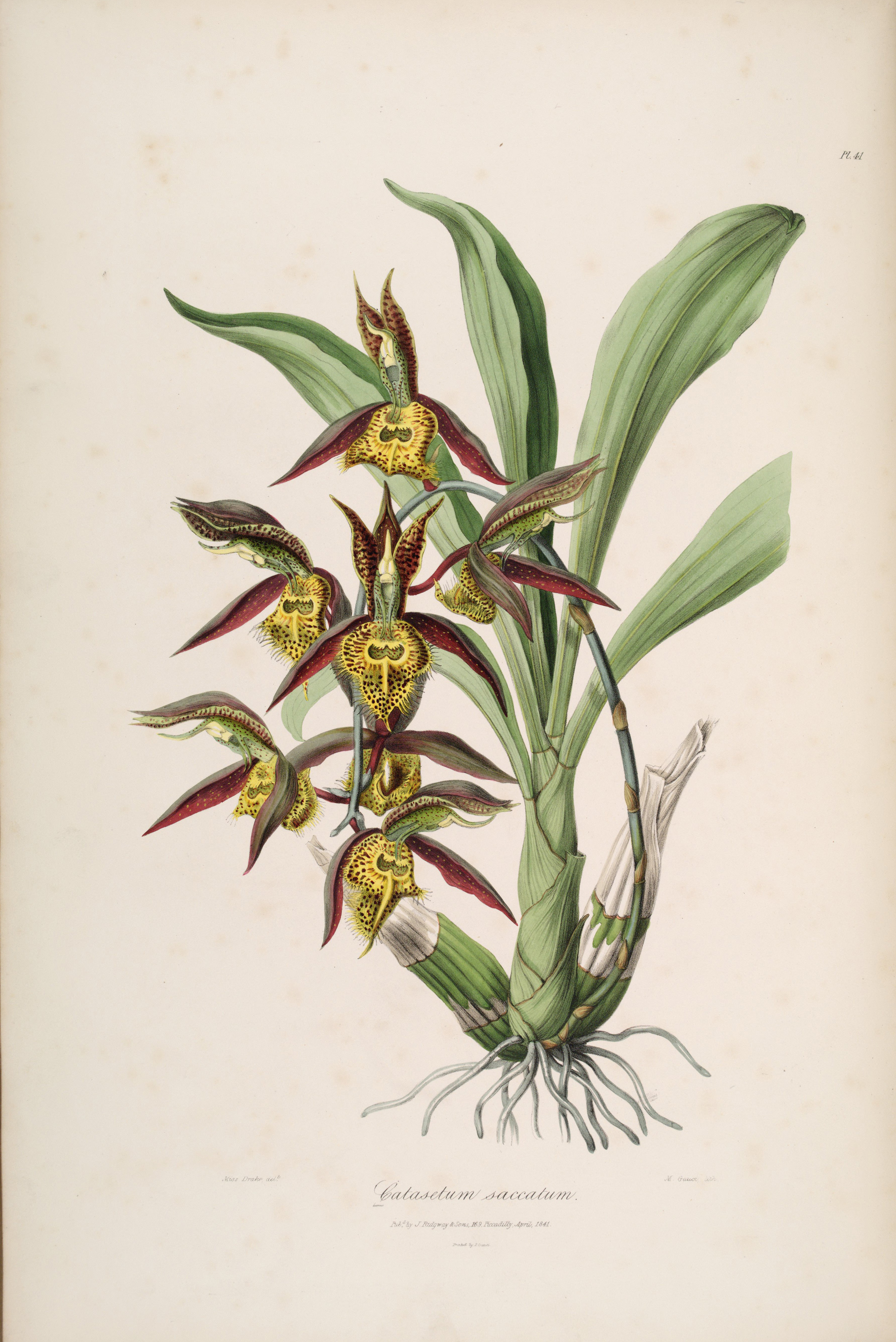
1838 illustration

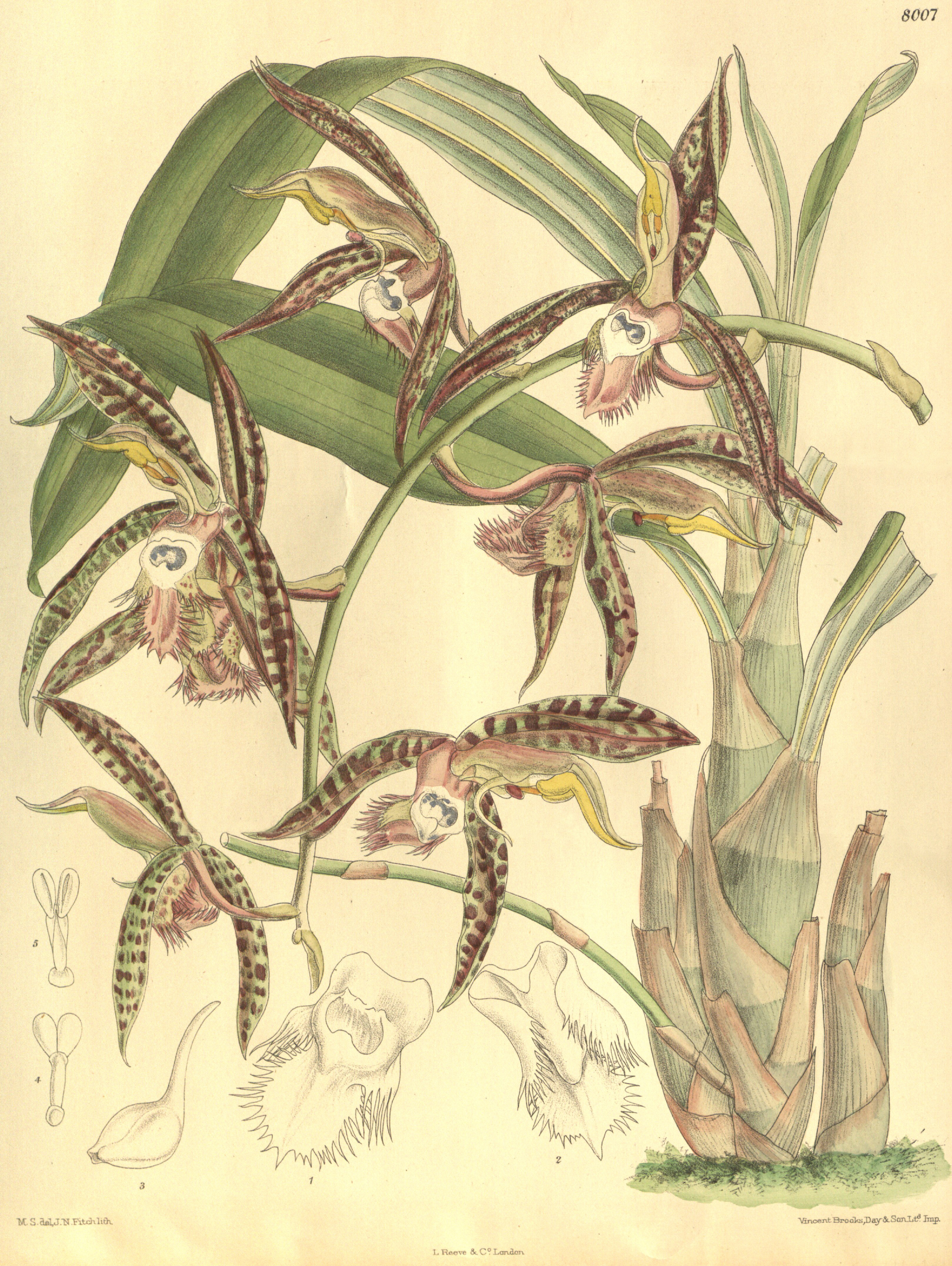
1905 illustration

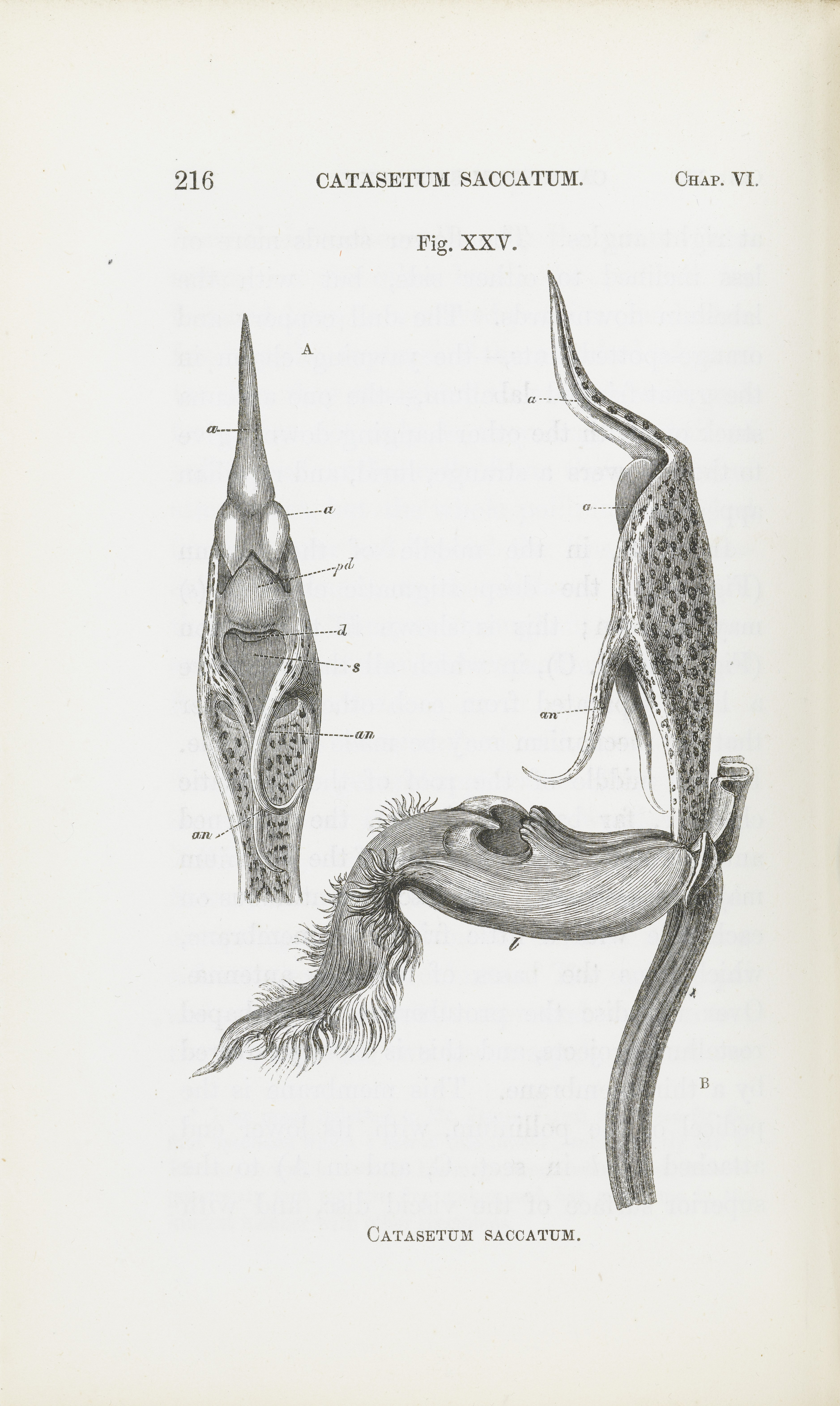
Illustration of the column

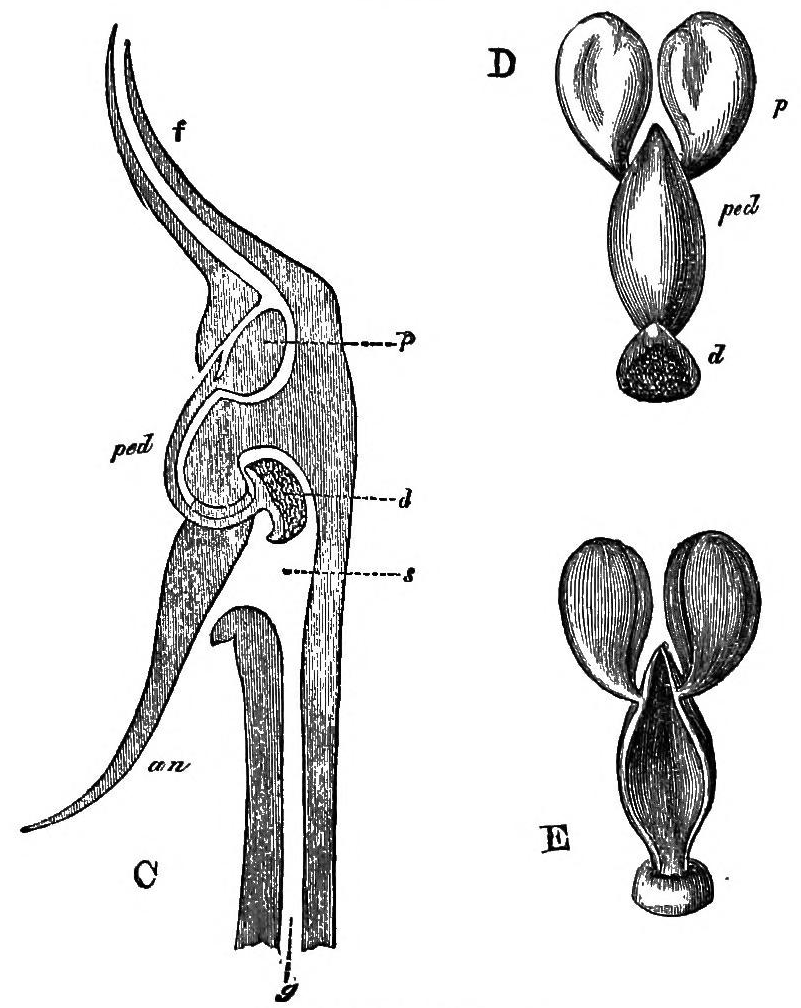
Illustration: (C) cross section of the column and (D-E) pollinia
