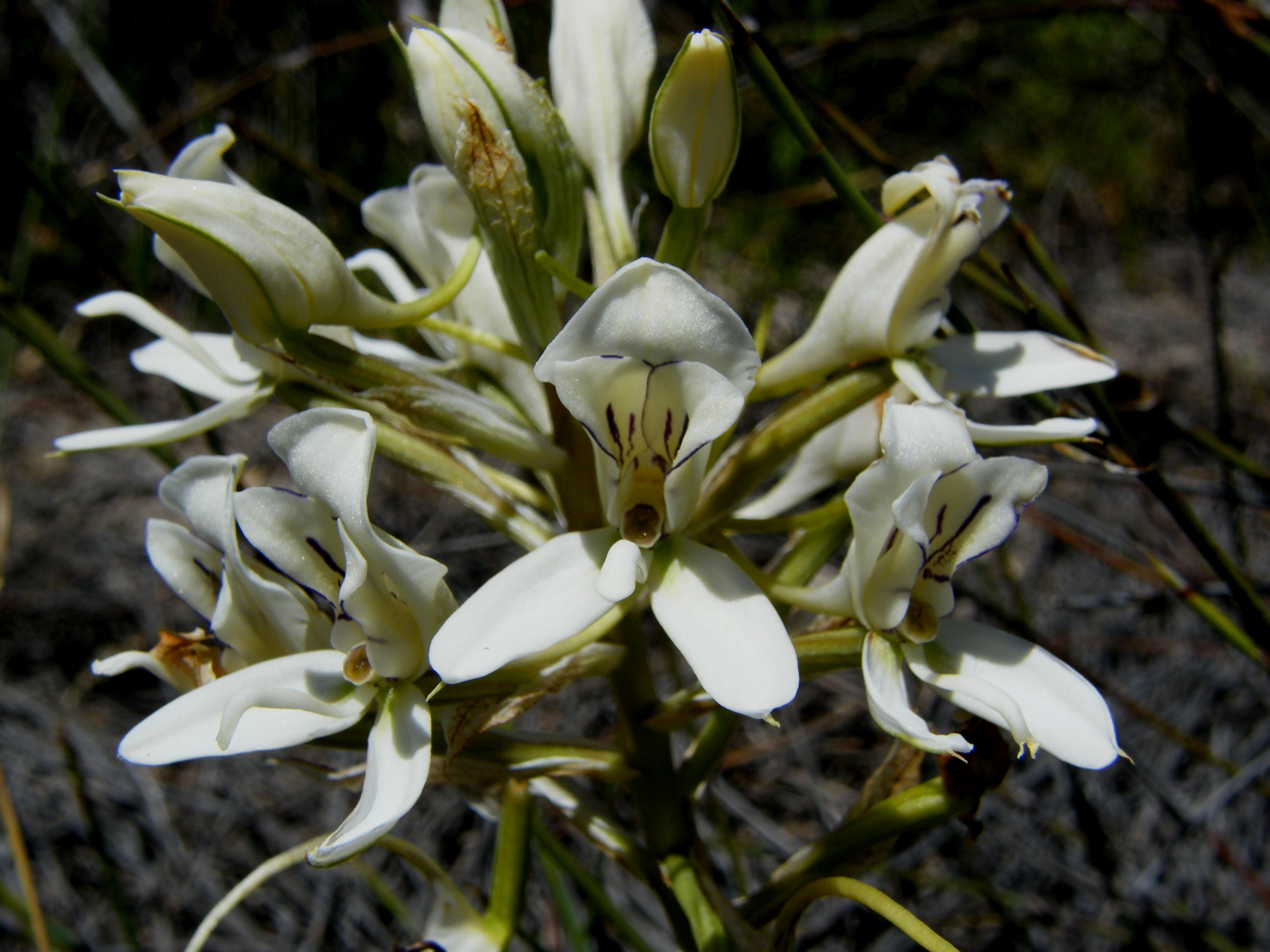

Scientific classification
- Kingdom: Plantae
- Clade: Tracheophytes
- Clade: Angiosperms
- Clade: Monocots
- Order: Asparagales
- Family: Orchidaceae
- Subfamily: Orchidoideae
- Genus: Disa
- Species: D. draconis

Binomial name
- Disa draconis Sw.

= Disa draconis =

Species of orchid

Disa draconis is a species of orchid found in South Africa (SW Cape Province).
