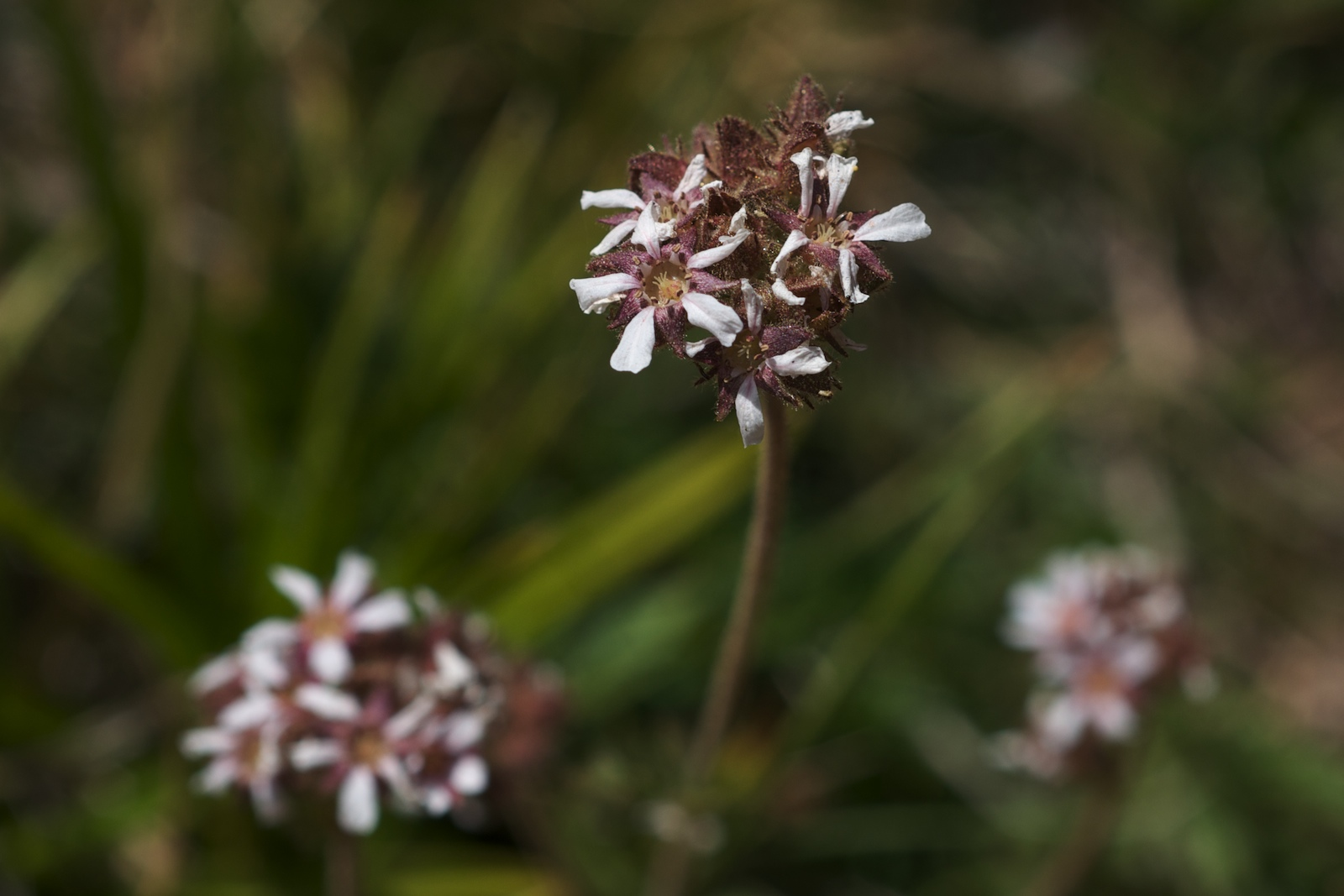

Conservation status
- Secure (NatureServe)

Scientific classification
- Kingdom: Plantae
- Clade: Tracheophytes
- Clade: Angiosperms
- Clade: Eudicots
- Clade: Rosids
- Order: Rosales
- Family: Rosaceae
- Genus: Potentilla
- Species: P. douglasii

Binomial name
- Potentilla douglasii Greene

Synonyms
- Horkelia fusca Lindl.; Horkelia fusca var. typica D.D.Keck

= Potentilla douglasii =

Species of flowering plant

Potentilla douglasii is a species of flowering plant in the rose family known by several common names, including pinewoods horkelia and dusky horkelia. It is native to the western United States from California to Wyoming, where it is generally found in mountain forests and meadows.

== Description ==
Potentilla douglasii grows as a perennial herb and forms a thick tuft of leaves, each growing erect up to 15 centimeters tall. Each leaf is made up of wedge-shaped or rounded leaflets with toothed or lobed edges. These are often gray-green and somewhat hairy. The brown or reddish hairy stem reaches a maximum height near 60 centimeters and holds an inflorescence of several clusters of flowers. Each flower has small, pointed bractlets beneath larger green, red, or magenta sepals and five white to pinkish petals. The center of the flower has a ring of ten stamens around a bunch of 10 to 20 small pistils.

== Taxonomy ==
The following varieties are recognised:

- P. f. var. brownii
- P. f. var. capitata (bighead horkelia) — native to the Pacific Northwest
- P. f. var. douglasii
- P. f. var. filicoides — endemic to Oregon
- P. f. var. parviflora (smallflower horkelia) — throughout the range of the species
- P. f. var. pseudocapitata
- P. f. var. tenella — occurs only in California
