= Cospeciation =

Form of coevolution

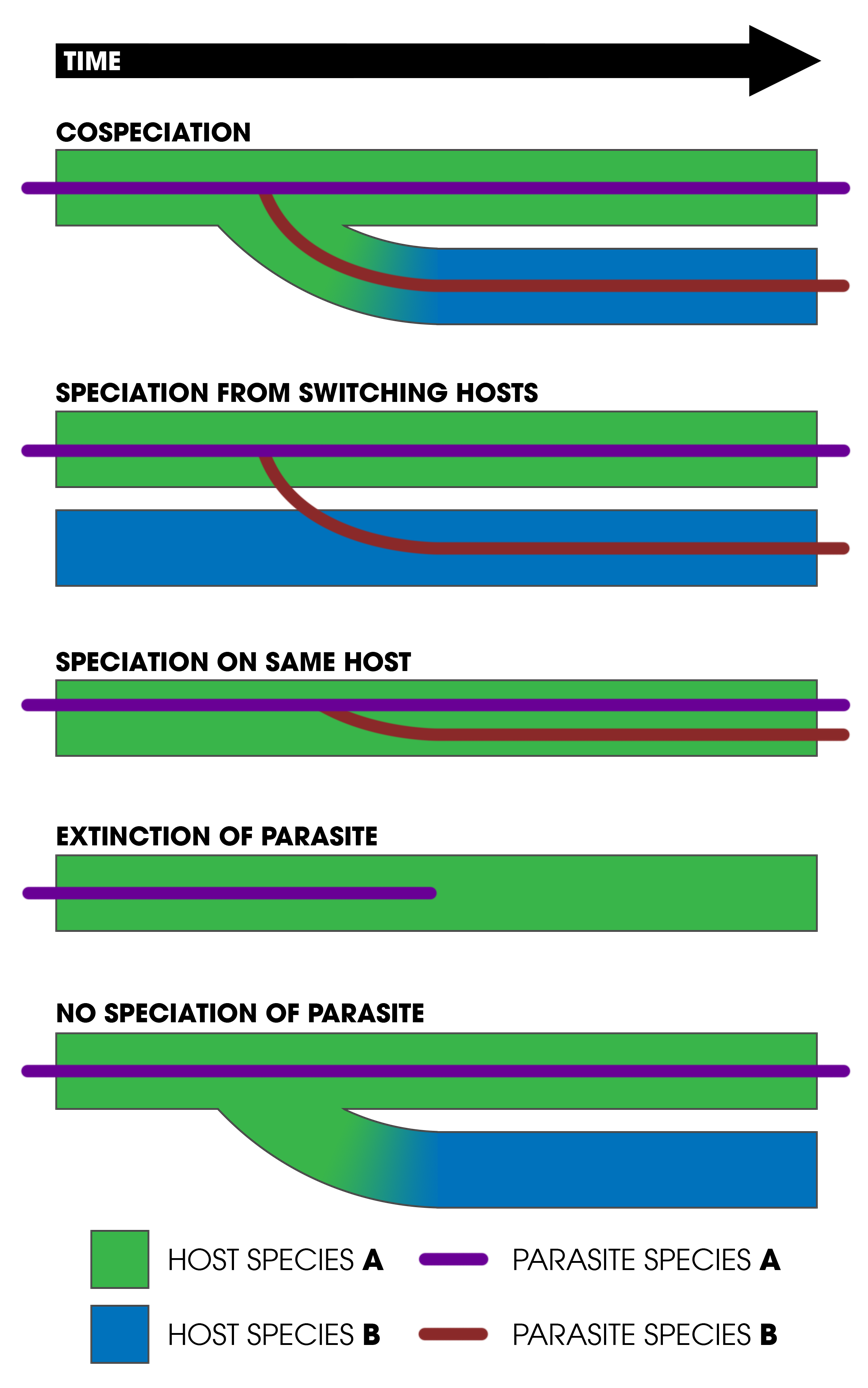
Cospeciation and host-parasite associations. From top to bottom: Cospeciation: host and parasite speciate concurrently Host switching: speciation as parasite switches hosts and evolves in reproductive isolation Independent speciation: parasite speciates on same host, reasons unrelated to host Extinction: parasite goes extinct on host Missing the boat: host speciates but parasite does not end up reproductively isolated

Cospeciation is a form of coevolution in which the speciation of one species dictates speciation of another species and is most commonly studied in host-parasite relationships. In the case of a host-parasite relationship, if two hosts of the same species get within close proximity of each other, parasites of the same species from each host are able to move between individuals and mate with the parasites on the other host. However, if a speciation event occurs in the host species, the parasites will no longer be able to "cross over" because the two new host species no longer mate and, if the speciation event is due to a geographic separation, it is very unlikely the two hosts will interact at all with each other. The lack of proximity between the hosts ultimately prevents the populations of parasites from interacting and mating. This can ultimately lead to speciation within the parasite.

According to Fahrenholz's rule, first proposed by Heinrich Fahrenholz in 1913, when host-parasite cospeciation has occurred, the phylogenies of the host and parasite come to mirror each other. In host-parasite phylogenies, and all species phylogenies for that matter, perfect mirroring is rare. Host-parasite phylogenies can be altered by host switching, extinction, independent speciation, and other ecological events, making cospeciation harder to detect. However, cospeciation is not limited to parasitism, but has been documented in symbiotic relationships like those of gut microbes in primates.

== Fahrenholz's rule ==
In 1913, Heinrich Fahrenholz proposed that the phylogenies of both the host and parasite will eventually become congruent, or mirror each other when cospeciation occurs. More specifically, more closely related parasite species will be found on closely related species of host. Thus, to determine if cospeciation has occurred within a host-parasite relationship, scientists have used comparative analyses on the host and parasite phylogenies.

In 1968, Daniel Janzen proposed an opposing theory to Fahrenholz's rule. Studying cospeciation within plant-insect relationships, he proposed that species have a physiological range of conditions and environments. Over time, conserved traits within a parasitic species allows for survival in a range of conditions or environments. "Ecological fitting", as it is known, means more closely related parasites will share similar traits that pertain to surviving on a particular host. This provides explanation for the congruence of the host-parasite phylogenies.

== Parasitic cospeciation ==
Fahrenholz's rule appears to be observed in the parasitic cospeciation of pocket gophers and chewing lice.

It is seen, too, between Poaceae grasses and Anguininae nematodes, and between some plants and Phyllonorycter leaf-mining moths.

== Symbiotic cospeciation ==
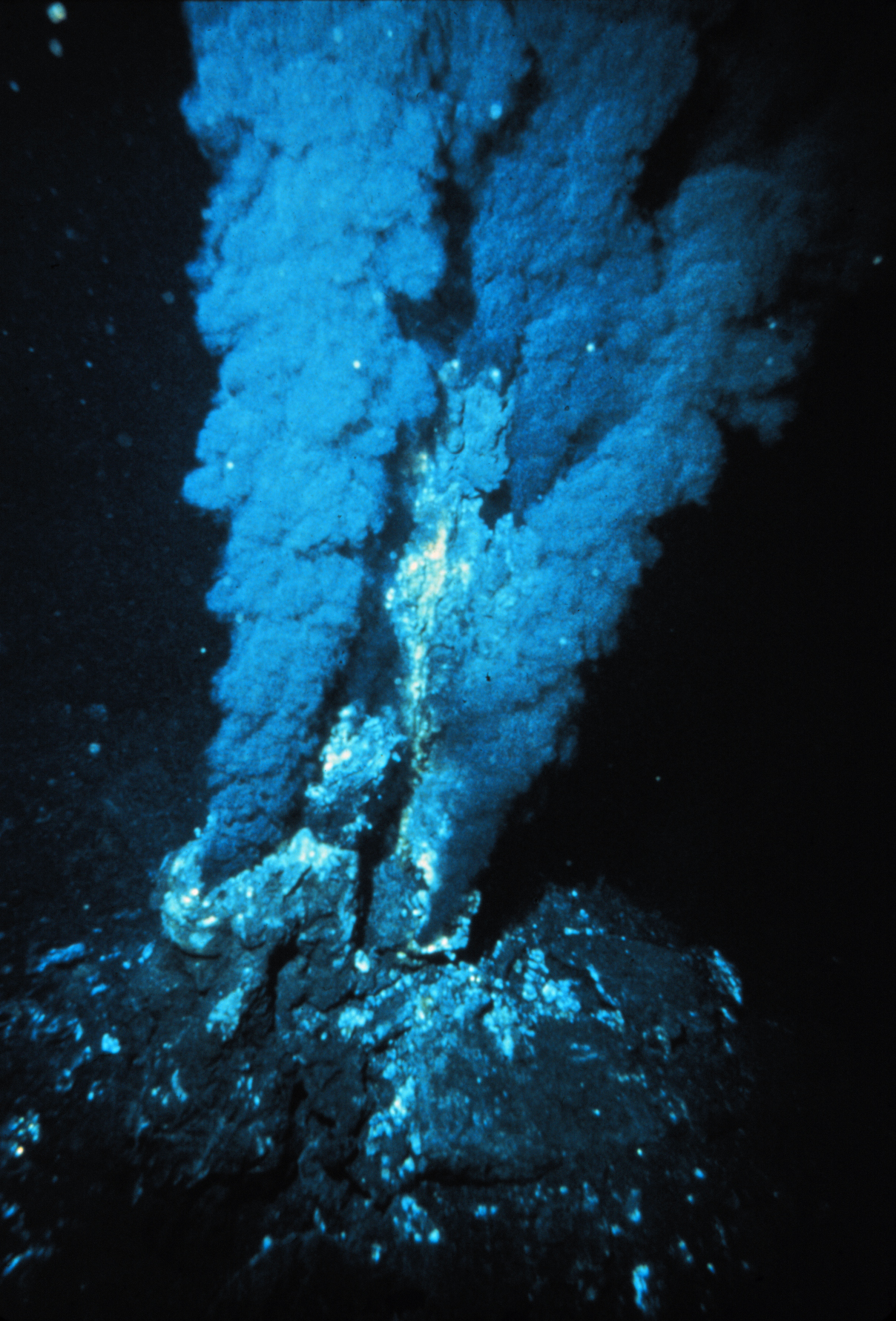
Black smokers provide energy and nutrients to chemoautotrophic bacteria, which in turn have symbiotically cospeciated with deep sea clams.

Among animals, symbiotic cospeciation is seen between Uroleucon (aphids) and Buchnera (plants in the Orobanchaceae), between deep sea clams and chemoautotrophic bacteria, and between Dendroctonus bark beetles and certain fungi.

Symbiotic cospeciation is found between Crematogaster ants and Macaranga plants, between Ficus fig trees and fig wasps, and between the Poaceae grasses and Epichloe fungi.

== False incongruence ==
The two main hurdles to determining cospeciation using Fahrenholz's rule are instances of false congruence and false incongruence. False congruence occurs when parasite and host phylogenies mirror each other but not due to cospeciation, for instance, if the parasites were to colonize the hosts after the host species had diverged and congruent phylogenies resulted by chance, but this is unlikely. False incongruence, when cospeciation has occurred, but the phylogenies do not mirror each other, is more common, and can be caused by a number of factors; it might also appear to be present if parasites that are present on a host are not detected by the experimenter.

=== Host switching ===
Though parasites have been thought to be specialized to a certain host species, it is common for a parasite to colonize a different host that was not previous colonized by the parasite species. If a "host switch" occurs after a cospeciation event, the presence of the parasite on other host species will disrupt any potential congruence in the two phylogenies. Coupled with extinction or independent speciation, phylogenetic comparisons can become complicated and entirely mask the cospeciation event.

=== Independent speciation ===
Typically independent speciation does not significantly alter the phylogenetic analysis used to measure cospeciation. However, in combination with extinction, independent speciation can become very problematic when trying to sort out host and parasite phylogenies. Independent speciation occurs when a single population on a single host undergoes speciation resulting in two sister lineages of parasite on a particular host. In other words, the parasite lineage speciates while the host lineage does not. This becomes complicated when the two lineages of parasites then undergo cospeciation with the host. If one of the two parasite lineages goes extinct from the new host lineage, the phylogenies of the host and parasite will begin to break apart. Even though the parasite and host cospeciated together, the phylogenies will not be congruent.

=== Extinction ===
After cospeciation, it is possible for a parasite (or symbiont) to become extinct while its host survives. This can happen if, for example, the host species adapts to a new habitat.

=== "Missing the boat" ===
Prior to speciation of the hosts, if the distribution of the parasite population among the host population is sporadic, it is possible that when host speciation occurs, it will occur with hosts that do not have the parasite population. This phenomenon is known as "missing the boat". The parasites could potentially cospeciate with their host down the line, however, the parasites could potentially be absent from some host lineages. Like extinction and independent speciation, "missing the boat" alone will probably have a minimal effect on mapping phylogenies, however, in conjunction with independent speciation, parasite and host phylogenies can begin to break apart.
