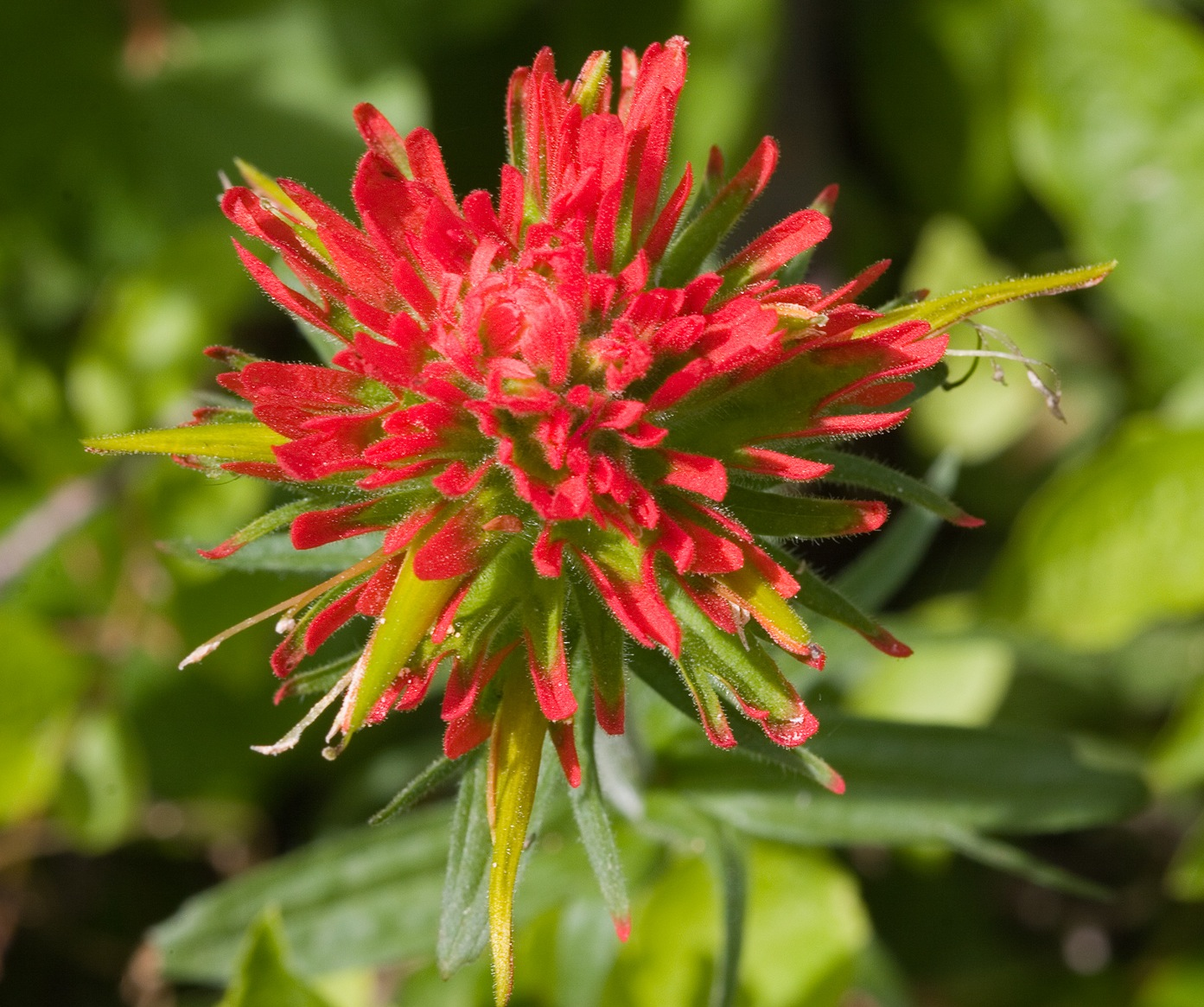

Scientific classification
- Kingdom: Plantae
- Clade: Tracheophytes
- Clade: Angiosperms
- Clade: Eudicots
- Clade: Asterids
- Order: Lamiales
- Family: Orobanchaceae
- Genus: Castilleja
- Species: C. applegatei

Binomial name
- Castilleja applegatei Fern.

= Castilleja applegatei =

Species of flowering plant

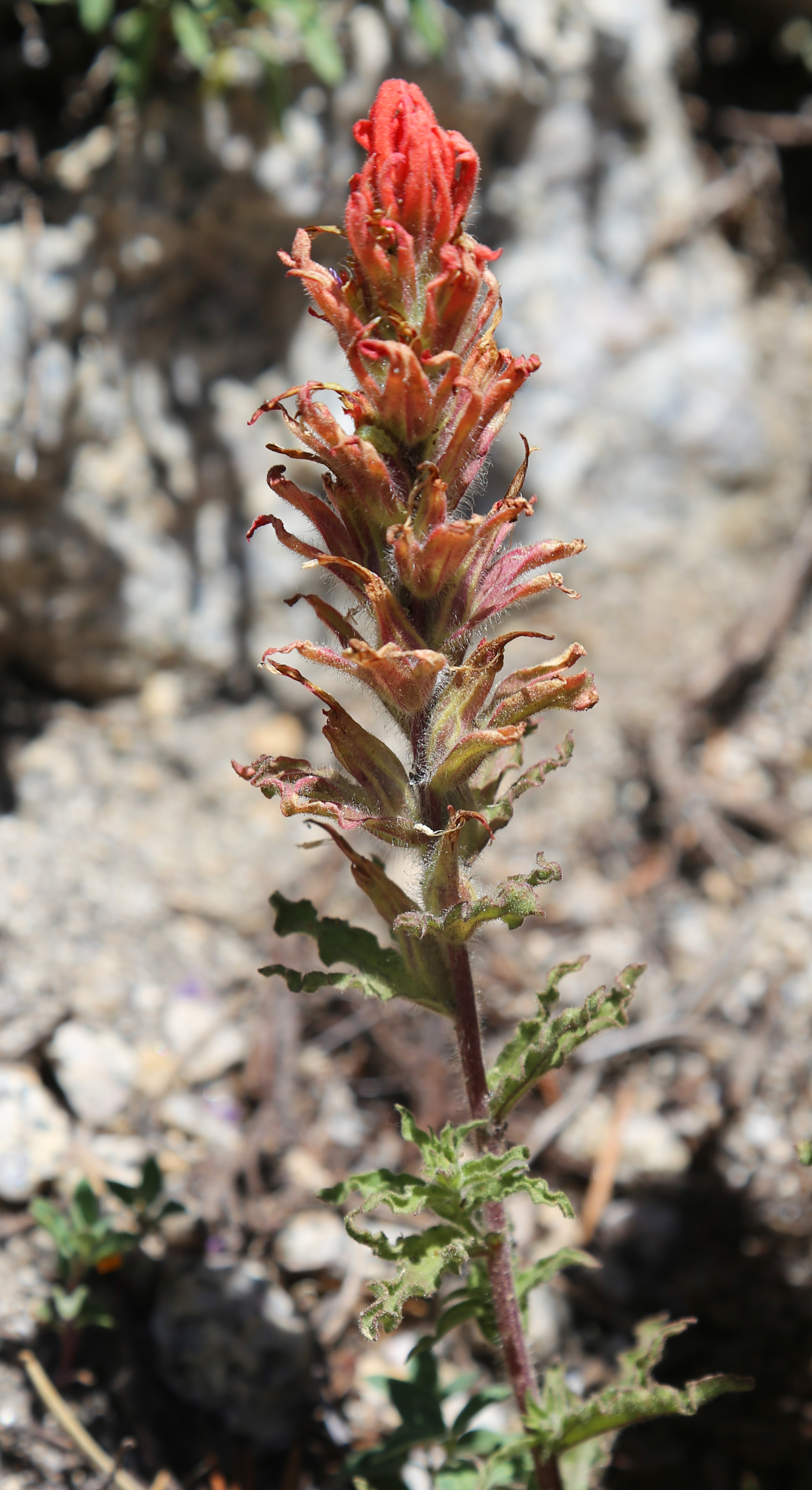
Castilleja applegatei flowerspike and characteristic wavy leaves

Castilleja applegatei is a species of Castilleja known by the common names Applegate's Indian paintbrush and wavyleaf Indian paintbrush.

It is native to the western United States. It is a short perennial with sticky, wavy-edged leaves, which are divided closer to the top of the plant. It bears bright, showy paintbrush-shaped inflorescences of small red to yellowish-red tubular flowers.

Like other species of Indian paintbrush, it is a root parasite, feeding off plants such as sagebrush. Although it can survive without parasitizing other plants, individuals that take a host grow faster and larger.

There are five subspecies. They are variable in appearance but distinguishable from other Castilleja species by the wavy margins and stickiness of the leaves.
