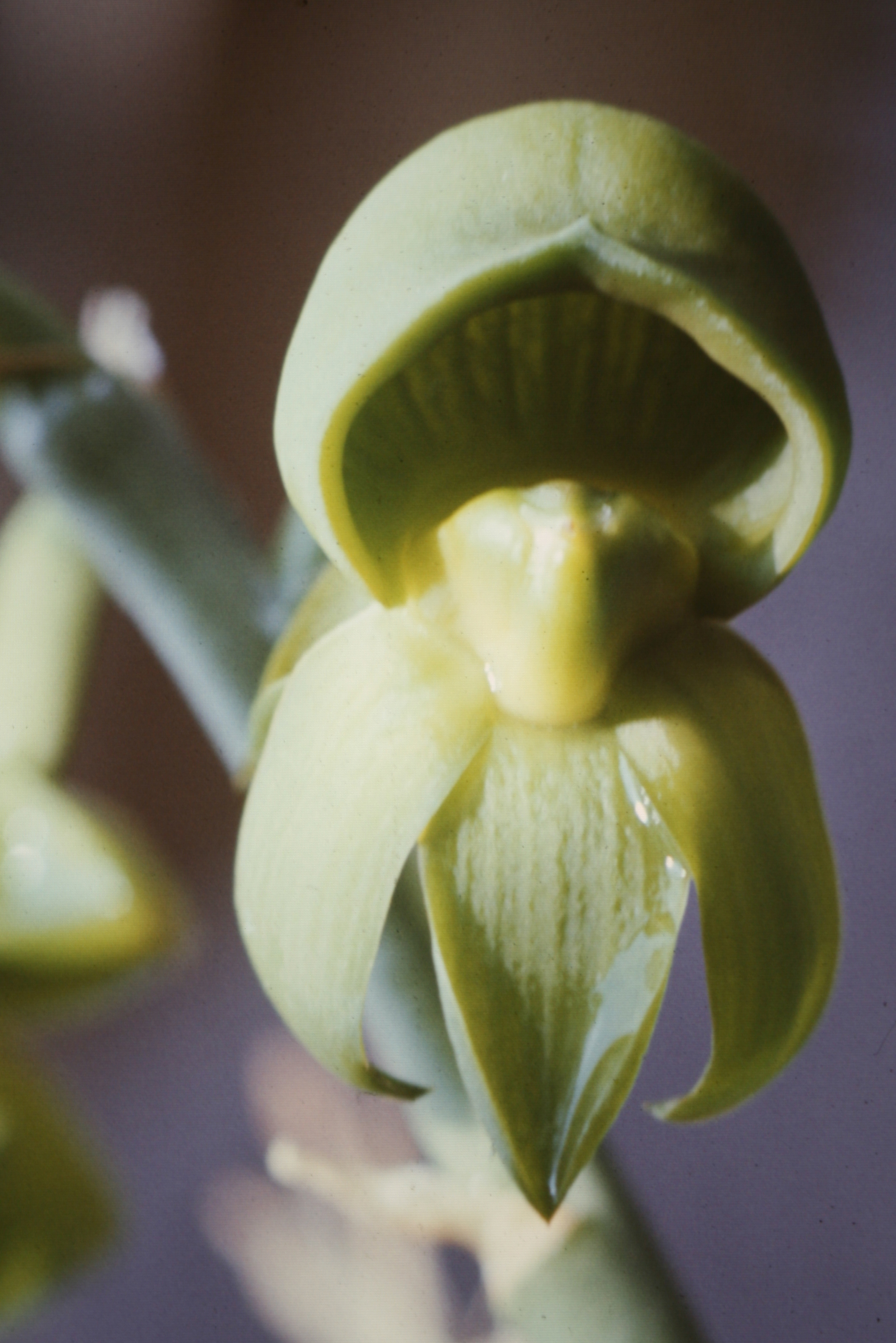

Scientific classification
- Kingdom: Plantae
- Clade: Tracheophytes
- Clade: Angiosperms
- Clade: Monocots
- Order: Asparagales
- Family: Orchidaceae
- Subfamily: Epidendroideae
- Genus: Catasetum
- Species: C. discolor

Binomial name
- Catasetum discolor (Lindl.) Lindl. (1844)

Synonyms
- Monachanthus discolor Lindl. (1835) (Basionym); Monachanthus discolor var. bushnanii Hook. (1837); Monachanthus discolor var. viridiflorus Hook. (1837); Monachanthus bushnanii Hook. (1840); Catasetum ciliatum Barb.Rodr. (1877); Catasetum claesianum L. Linden & Cogn. (1893); Catasetum discolor var. vinosum Cogn. (1894); Catasetum discolor var. bushnanii Cogn. (1902); Catasetum discolor var. viridiflorum Cogn. (1902); Catasetum discolor var. claesianum (L. Linden & Cogn.) Mansf. (1932); Catasetum discolor f. genuinum Hoehne (1942)

= Catasetum discolor =

Species of orchid

Catasetum discolor, the differently colored catasetum, is a species of orchid.
