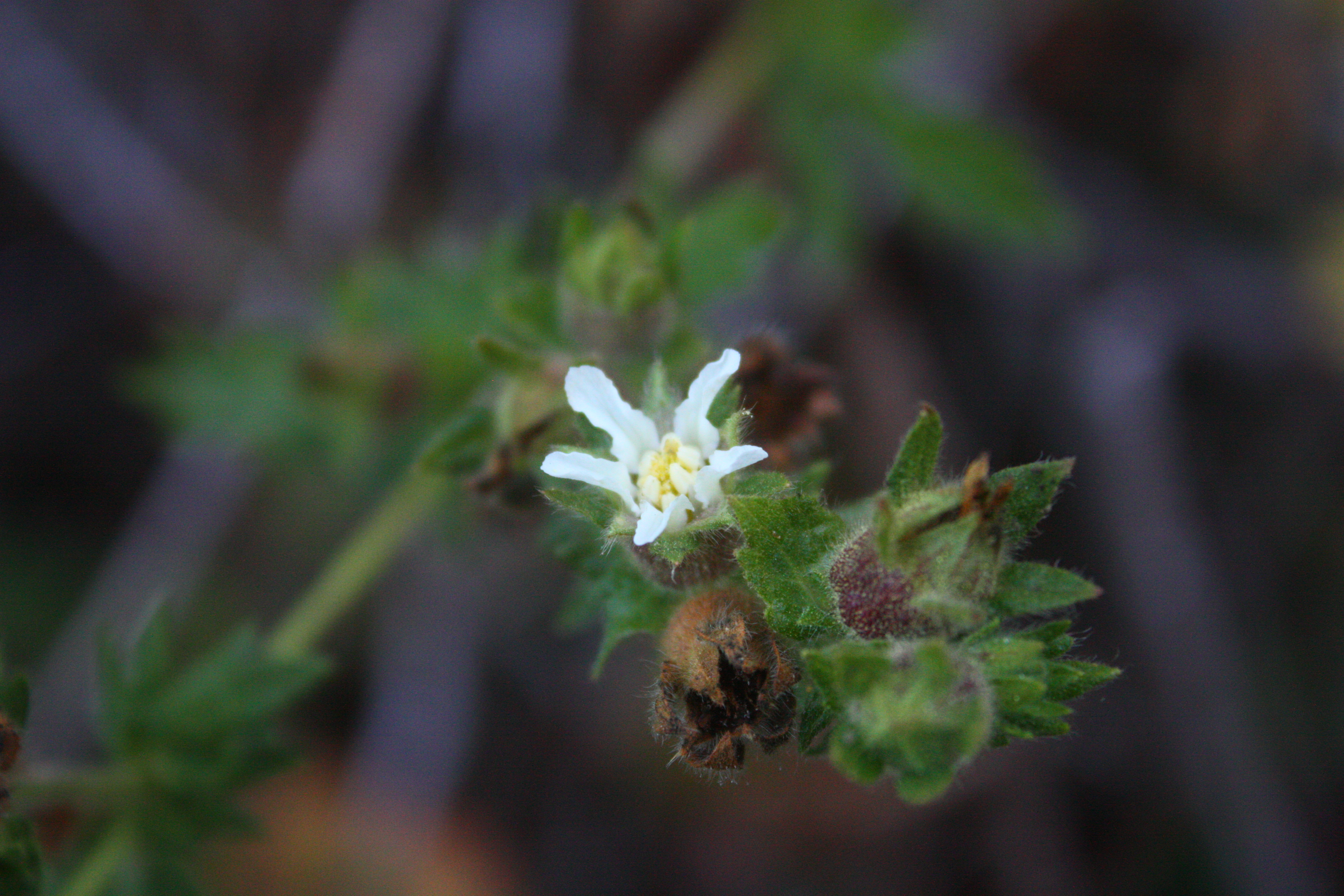

Scientific classification
- Kingdom: Plantae
- Clade: Tracheophytes
- Clade: Angiosperms
- Clade: Eudicots
- Clade: Rosids
- Order: Rosales
- Family: Rosaceae
- Genus: Potentilla
- Species: P. californica

Binomial name
- Potentilla californica (Cham. & Schltdl.) Greene

Synonyms
- Horkelia californica Cham. & Schltdl.; Sibbaldia californica (Cham. & Schltdl.) Spreng.

= Potentilla californica =

Species of flowering plant

Potentilla californica, also known as California horkelia, is a species of flowering plant in the rose family.

It is endemic to California, where it grows on scrubby coastal and inland mountain slopes, primarily in the California Coast Ranges and western Sierra Nevada foothills.

== Description ==
Potentilla californica is a clumping perennial herb producing erect green stems variable in height from 10 centimeters to over a meter. The green leaves are up to 40 centimeters long and are made up of hairy, rounded, toothed leaflets each up to 6 centimeters in length.

The inflorescence holds solitary and clustered flowers, each with toothed bractlets and thick, pointed sepals. There are five small white petals. Flowers bloom April to July.
