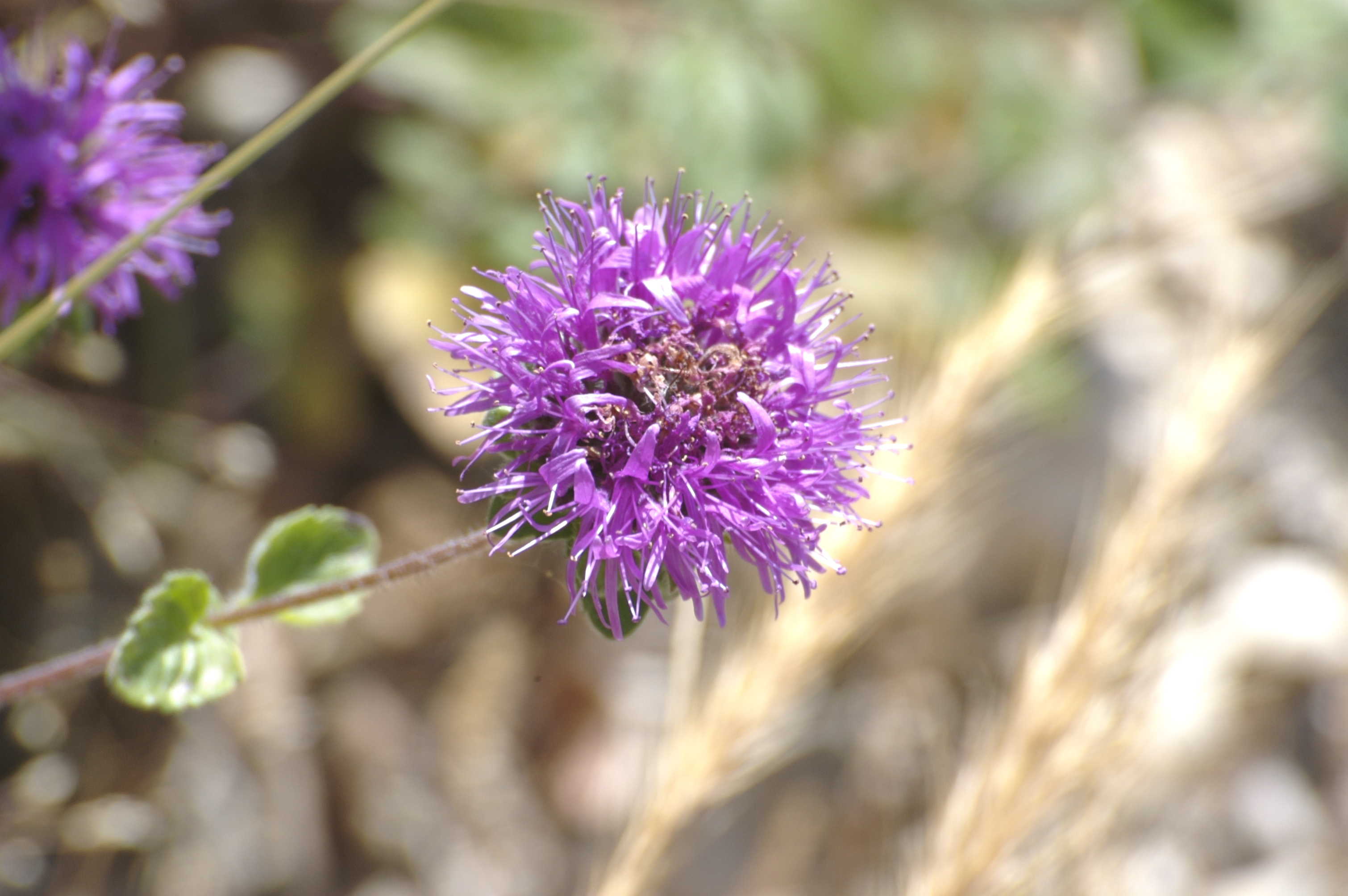
- Flowers

Conservation status
- Imperiled (NatureServe)

Scientific classification
- Kingdom: Plantae
- Clade: Tracheophytes
- Clade: Angiosperms
- Clade: Eudicots
- Clade: Asterids
- Order: Lamiales
- Family: Lamiaceae
- Genus: Monardella
- Species: M. undulata
- Subspecies: M. u. subsp. undulata

Trinomial name
- Monardella undulata subsp. undulata

Synonyms
- Monardella frutescens (Hoover) Jokerst; Monardella undulata var. frutescens Hoover; Monardella undulata var. glandulosa Regel

= Monardella undulata subsp. undulata =

Species of flowering plant

Monardella undulata subsp. undulata, synonym Monardella frutescens, is a rare subspecies of flowering plant in the mint family known by the common name San Luis Obispo monardella.

== Description ==
Monardella undulata subsp. undulata is a perennial herb producing several purple stems. The thin, narrow, wavy-edged leaves are 1 to 5 centimeters long and borne in clusters along the stem. The inflorescence is a head of several flowers blooming in a cup of papery purplish to straw-colored bracts. The flowers are rose-purple to purple in color. This subspecies may hybridize and so intergrade with its relative, Monardella undulata subsp. crispa, where their distribution overlaps.

== Habitat and Distribution ==
Monardella undulata subsp. undulata Habitat includes dunes and coastal areas. It is endemic to California, where it is known only from the sand dunes and coastal sage and chaparral scrub on the coastline of San Luis Obispo County.

== Conservation ==
Monardella undulata subsp. undulata is threatened by coastal development.
