= M. viridis =

M. viridis may refer to:

- Macrozamia viridis, a burrawang, a plant species found in Australia
- Mantella viridis, the green mantella, a frog species found in Madagascar
- Marenzelleria viridis, a species of marine worm found in European coastal waters
- Megalaima viridis, the small green barbet (or white-cheeked barbet), a bird species found in southern India
- Melibe viridis, a species of sea slug found in the tropical Indo-West Pacific
- Mentha viridis, a synonym of M. spicata, spearmint, a species of aromatic perennial herbs cultivated around the world
- Merops viridis, the blue-throated bee-eater, a bird species found in South-East Asia
- Microcystis viridis, a species of freshwater cyanobacteria observed in Europe and Australia
- Monachanthus viridis, an obsolete synonym for three species of orchid: Catasetum barbatum (the bearded catasetum), Catasetum macrocarpum (the monkey goblet or monk's head orchid) and Catasetum cernuum (the nodding catasetum)
- Monardella viridis, the green monardella, a perennial herb species found in California
- Morelia viridis, the green tree python, a snake species found in New Guinea, Indonesia and parts of Australia
- Musa viridis, a plant species in the banana and plantain family, found in Vietnam
- Myxodes viridis, a blenny, a fish species found along the coast of Chile and Peru

== See also ==
- Viridis (disambiguation)
