= Siskiyou monardella =

Siskiyou monardella is a common name for several plants and may refer to:

- Monardella purpurea
- Monardella siskiyouensis
