= M. nana =

M. nana may refer to:

- Mazama nana, the pygmy brocket, a deer species from South America
- Microstrophia nana, a gastropod species endemic to Mauritius
- Monardella nana, the yellow monardella, a flowering plant species
- Myristica nana, a plant species endemic to Papua New Guinea

== Synonyms ==
- Maxillaria nana, a synonym for Maxillaria uncata, the hook-shaped maxillaria, an orchid species found from southern Mexico to southern Brazil

== See also ==
- Nana (disambiguation)
