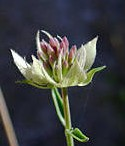

Scientific classification
- Kingdom: Plantae
- Clade: Tracheophytes
- Clade: Angiosperms
- Clade: Eudicots
- Clade: Asterids
- Order: Lamiales
- Family: Lamiaceae
- Genus: Monardella
- Species: M. robisonii

Binomial name
- Monardella robisonii Epling ex Munz

Synonyms
- Monardella robinsonii auct.

= Monardella robisonii =

Species of tree

Monardella robisonii is a species of flowering plant in the mint family, known by the common name Robison's monardella.

== Distribution ==
It is endemic to California, where it is known only from sky island habitats in the Mojave Desert mountains, primarily within areas of Joshua Tree National Park and of lower elevations in Sand to Snow National Monument. It is found among granite boulders in the Desert chaparral and Pinyon-juniper woodland plant communities.

Where ranges overlap, it can intergrade with Monardella linoides or Monardella mojavensis.

== Description ==
Monardella robisonii is a perennial herb producing an erect, hairy, grayish stem 5–50 cm (2.0–19.7 in) tall, lined with pairs of widely lance-shaped leaves.

The inflorescence is a head of several pale pink flowers blooming in a cup of pinkish or brownish bracts. Its bloom period is June to September.
