= Monardella arizonica =

Scientific classification
- Kingdom: Plantae
- Clade: Tracheophytes
- Clade: Angiosperms
- Clade: Eudicots
- Clade: Asterids
- Order: Lamiales
- Family: Lamiaceae
- Genus: Monardella
- Species: M. arizonica

Binomial name
- Monardella arizonica Epling

Species of flowering plant

Monardella arizonica is a plant species endemic to Arizona in the United States, known by the common name Arizona monardella.

== Ancient history ==
The species has been confirmed to have been native to northern Arizona since at least the Late Wisconsin late glacial period based upon pollen core analysis at the Waterman Mountains (Coconino County) - (not the Waterman Mountains of Pima County); dominant trees of Juniperus osteosperma and Pinus monophylla remain extant species to the present time in this predominantly Pinyon-juniper woodland.

== Description ==
The two-lipped, tubular flowers are formed in terminal clusters.

== Horticulture and ecology ==
The species has reasonable frost resistance, but resents dampness in winter. The plant can be propagated from seed or summer cuttings of perennial species, or by division of clumps.

== See also ==
- Monardella viridis
