= Monardella stoneana =

Conservation status
- Critically Imperiled (NatureServe)

Scientific classification
- Kingdom: Plantae
- Clade: Embryophytes
- Clade: Tracheophytes
- Clade: Spermatophytes
- Clade: Angiosperms
- Clade: Eudicots
- Clade: Asterids
- Order: Lamiales
- Family: Lamiaceae
- Genus: Monardella
- Species: M. stoneana

Binomial name
- Monardella stoneana Elvin & A.C. Sanders

Species of flowering plant

Monardella stoneana is a rare species of flowering plant in the mint family known by the common name Jennifer's monardella.

This species was named for the plant ecologist Jennifer Stone. This critically endangered species was separated from Monardella viminea, a federally listed endangered species from the same area.

== Distribution ==
It is known from a small range straddling the US-Mexico border between San Diego County, California, and Baja California. In California it is known only from the San Ysidro Mountains, where it grows in coastal sage scrub, chaparral, and other local habitat. It grows in rock cracks and crevices, sometimes in intermittent streams that may flood with winter rains.

== Description ==
Monardella stoneana, a rare plant, is a low, compact subshrub with strongly aromatic foliage. The hairless or sparsely hairy stems spread to 50 or 60 centimeters in length. They are lined with lance-shaped leaves with green or purple-tinged blades up to 3.5 centimeters long by 1 wide. The inflorescence is a terminal cluster of flowers or a raceme of two or more clusters of flowers with lance-shaped bracts at the bases. The flowers have tubular corollas tinged pale pink or bluish with long stamens emerging from the centers.
