= Monardella australis subsp. cinerea =

Scientific classification
- Kingdom: Plantae
- Clade: Tracheophytes
- Clade: Angiosperms
- Clade: Eudicots
- Clade: Asterids
- Order: Lamiales
- Family: Lamiaceae
- Genus: Monardella
- Species: M. australis
- Subspecies: M. a. subsp. cinerea

Trinomial name
- Monardella australis subsp. cinerea (Abrams) A.C.Sanders & Elvin

Synonyms
- Monardella cinerea Abrams

Subspecies of flowering plant

Monardella australis subsp. cinerea, synonym Monardella cinerea, is a rare subspecies of flowering plant in the mint family, known by the common name gray monardella. It is endemic to California, where it is known from the San Gabriel Mountains and San Jacinto Mountains in the Los Angeles area, and the central coast Santa Lucia Mountains in the Los Padres National Forest. It grows in rocky forested areas.

== Description ==
Monardella australis subsp. cinerea is a small, hairy perennial herb growing in a low mat, its stems no more than 15 centimeters long. The triangular leaves are very hairy, gland-dotted, and under a centimeter in length. The inflorescence is a head of several flowers blooming in a cup of reddish or purplish rough-hairy bracts. The flowers are purplish pink in color.
