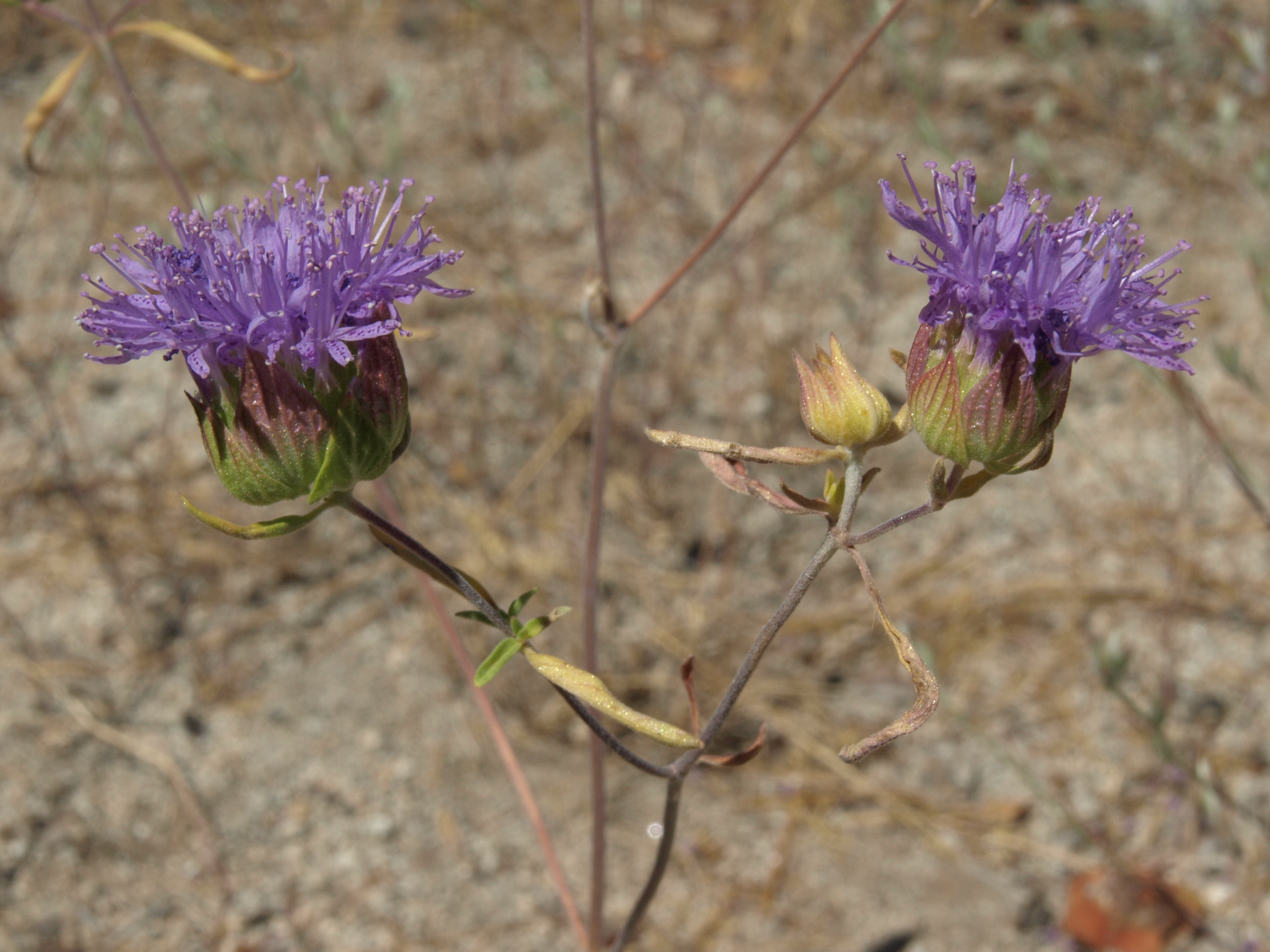

Scientific classification
- Kingdom: Plantae
- Clade: Tracheophytes
- Clade: Angiosperms
- Clade: Eudicots
- Clade: Asterids
- Order: Lamiales
- Family: Lamiaceae
- Genus: Monardella
- Species: M. breweri

Binomial name
- Monardella breweri A.Gray

Synonyms
- Madronella breweri (A.Gray) Greene

= Monardella breweri =

Species of flowering plant

Monardella breweri, commonly known as Brewer's monardella, is a species of flowering plant in the mint family.

== Description ==
Monardella breweri is a hairy annual herb producing a branching erect stem up to about 65 centimeters in maximum height. The oppositely arranged oval leaves are up to 4.5 centimeters long. The inflorescence is a head of several flowers blooming in a cup of stiff, pointed, veined, purplish bracts up to 3 centimeters wide. Each hairy pinkish five-lobed flower is just over a centimeter long.

== Subspecies ==
As of February 2024, Plants of the World Online accepted four subspecies:

- Monardella breweri subsp. breweri
- Monardella breweri subsp. glandulifera (I.M.Johnst.) Elvin
- Monardella breweri subsp. lanceolata (A.Gray) A.C.Sanders & Elvin
- Monardella breweri subsp. microcephala (A.Gray) Elvin & A.C.Sanders

== Distribution ==
Monardella breweri is endemic to California, where its range extends from the San Francisco Bay Area through the Central Coast Ranges to the Transverse Ranges, including the Santa Monica Mountains, in the Greater Los Angeles Area. Its habitat includes chaparral and oak woodland.
