= Monardella exilis =

Scientific classification
- Kingdom: Plantae
- Clade: Tracheophytes
- Clade: Angiosperms
- Clade: Eudicots
- Clade: Asterids
- Order: Lamiales
- Family: Lamiaceae
- Genus: Monardella
- Species: M. exilis

Binomial name
- Monardella exilis (A.Gray) Greene

Species of flowering plant

Monardella exilis, with the common names Mojave monardella and desert monardella, is an annual plant in the genus Monardella of the mint family (Lamiaceae).

== Distribution ==
The plant is endemic to California, in the Mojave Desert and southern Sierra Nevada. It grows at 600–2,100 metres (2,000–6,900 ft) in elevation. In the Antelope Valley it is found in Desert scrub and Joshua tree woodland habitats. In the Sierra it is also found in pinyon pine (Pinus monophylla) woodlands.

== Description ==
Monardella exilis is an annual herb, growing 6–30 centimetres (2.4–11.8 in) in height.

It has white flowers with green with purple tinges, during a bloom period from April to September.
