= Monardella sheltonii =

Scientific classification
- Kingdom: Plantae
- Clade: Tracheophytes
- Clade: Angiosperms
- Clade: Eudicots
- Clade: Asterids
- Order: Lamiales
- Family: Lamiaceae
- Genus: Monardella
- Species: M. sheltonii

Binomial name
- Monardella sheltonii (Torr.) Howell

Species of flowering plant

Monardella sheltonii is a species of flowering plant in the mint family known by the common name Shelton's monardella.

It is native to the mountains of northern California and southern Oregon, including the Klamath Mountains and Sierra Nevada, where it grows in chaparral, forest, and other habitat, often on serpentine soils.

== Description ==
Monardella sheltonii is a rhizomatous perennial herb producing an erect stem lined with pairs of oppositely arranged lance-shaped leaves. The inflorescence is a head of several flowers blooming in a cup of leaflike bracts 1 to 3 centimeters wide. The five-lobed purple flowers are 1 to 2 centimeters long.

The Concow tribe called the plant bul-luk’-tō (Konkow language).
