= Monardella stebbinsii =

Conservation status
- Critically Imperiled (NatureServe)

Scientific classification
- Kingdom: Plantae
- Clade: Tracheophytes
- Clade: Angiosperms
- Clade: Eudicots
- Clade: Asterids
- Order: Lamiales
- Family: Lamiaceae
- Genus: Monardella
- Species: M. stebbinsii

Binomial name
- Monardella stebbinsii Hardham & Bartel

Species of flowering plant

Monardella stebbinsii is a rare species of flowering plant in the mint family known by the common names Feather River monardella and Stebbins' monardella. It is endemic to Plumas County, California, where it is known from only about ten occurrences along the North Fork of the Feather River in the High Sierra. It is a member of the serpentine soils flora in rocky mountain habitat.

== Description ==
Monardella stebbinsii is a perennial herb forming a mat or clump of densely hairy stems. The purple-gray hairy leaves are oval in shape and arranged oppositely on the stems. The inflorescence is a head of several flowers blooming in a small cup of leathery purplish bracts. The pink flowers are between 1 and 2 centimeters long.
