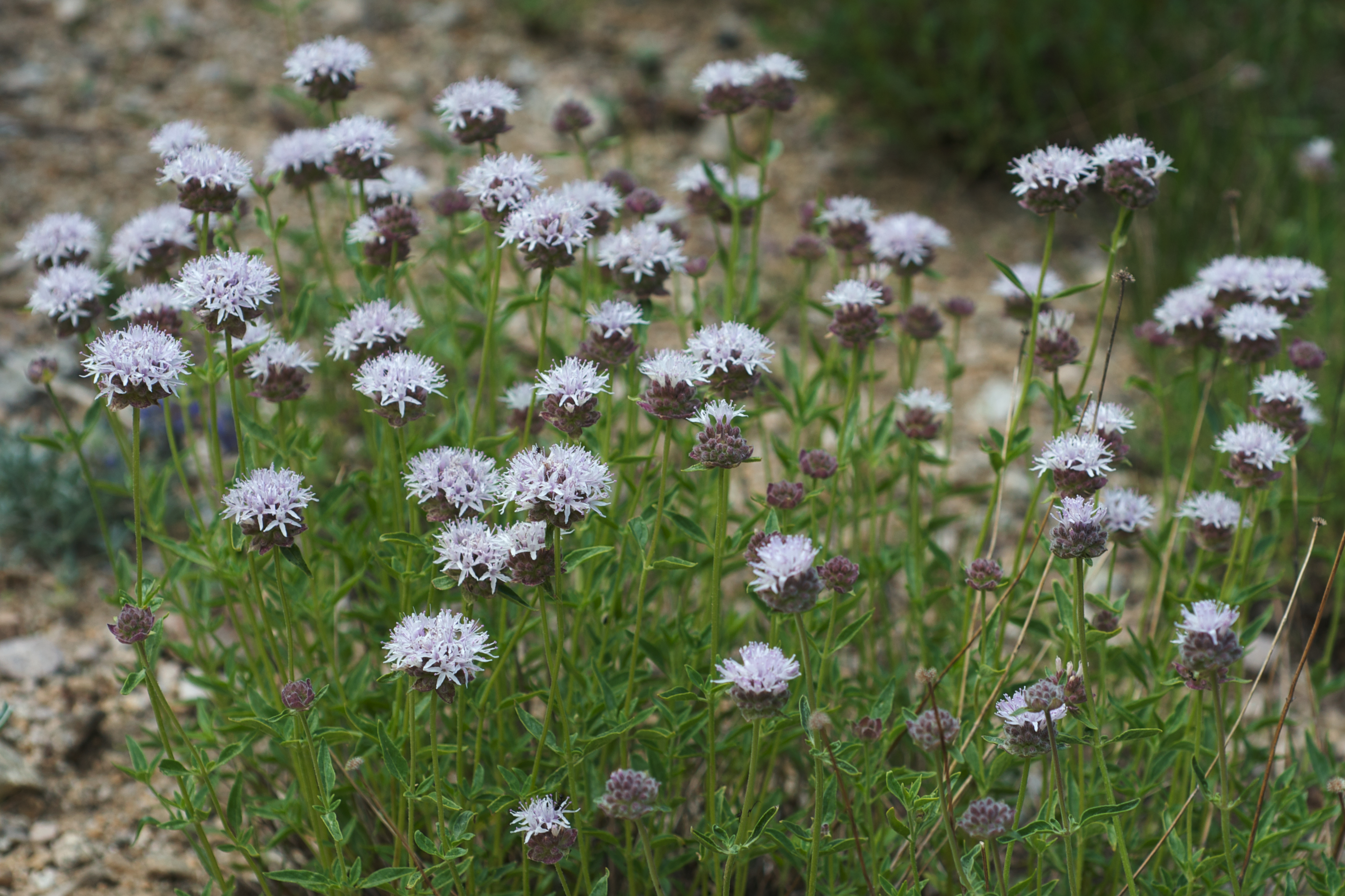

Conservation status
- Apparently Secure (NatureServe)

Scientific classification
- Kingdom: Plantae
- Clade: Tracheophytes
- Clade: Angiosperms
- Clade: Eudicots
- Clade: Asterids
- Order: Lamiales
- Family: Lamiaceae
- Genus: Monardella
- Species: M. odoratissima

Binomial name
- Monardella odoratissima Benth.

Subspecies
- See text.

Synonyms
- Madronella odoratissima (Benth.) Greene

= Monardella odoratissima =

Species of flowering plant

Monardella odoratissima (mountain coyote mint, mountain beebalm, mountain monardella or mountain pennyroyal) is a perennial flowering plant. It is a member of the mint family Lamiaceae. It has the minty odor characteristic of this family. In 2020, Monardella villosa was included in M. odoratissima. As of April 2024, acceptance of the inclusion varies.

== Description ==
When distinguished from Monardella villosa, Monardella odoratissima is described as a subshrub, growing to 10–45 cm (4 in – 1 ft 6 in). It is generally sparsely hairy, occasionally with sparse stalked cone-shaped glandular hairs. Its untoothed leaves are 15–50 mm (0.6–2.0 in) long and 5–18 mm (0.2–0.7 in) wide, and are green to ashy gray, often tinged with purple. They may be sparsely or densely hairy. The glandular hairs on the underside of the leaf occur in pits. The inflorescence is a cluster of flowers and is usually 12–28 mm (0.5–1.1 in) across, but may be up to 37 mm (1.5 in) across. Each main stem may bear one or several inflorescences. The Inflorescence has erect bracts forming a cup-like structure. The bracts are pale greenish or tinged purple to rose. Each flower has sepals 6–11 mm (0.2–0.4 in) long which are densely hairy or woolly. The petals are white, lavender or purple and are 10–20 mm (0.4–0.8 in) long.

== Taxonomy ==
Monardella odoratissima was first described by George Bentham in 1834. In 1844, Bentham described Monardella villosa as a separate species. Each has been divided into a number of subspecies. A 2009 review of the genus Monardella described Monardella villosa as a "complex species", dividing it into three subspecies, each synonymized with taxa that had been described as separate Monardella species. The 2012 Jepson Manual accepted Monardella villosa.

Studies in preparation for new editions of the Flora of North America and The Jepson Manual showed that there was "continuous variation" between M. odoratissima and M. villosa. Traditional characters that had been used to separate the two species varied with location, elevation and soil type. Plants traditionally placed in M. villosa occurred at lower elevations, those placed in M. odoratissima at higher elevations, but there was a wide zone in which the intermediates were found, particularly at middle elevations. Accordingly, the two species were combined under the older name Monardella odoratissima. Former subspecies of M. villosa were given new names in M. odoratissima. As of April 2024, Plants of the World Online accepted the placement of M. villosa within M. odoratissima.

=== Subspecies ===
As of April 2024, Plants of the World Online accepted six subspecies of Monardella odoratissima.

Subspecies	Synonym in Monardella villosa	Some other synonyms in Monardella
Monardella odoratissima subsp. discolor (Greene) Epling		M. discolor Greene, M. nervosa Greene
Monardella odoratissima subsp. franciscana (Elmer) Brunell	M. villosa subsp. franciscana	M. franciscana Elmer
Monardella odoratissima subsp. obispoensis (Hoover) Brunell	M. villosa subsp. obispoensis	
Monardella odoratissima subsp. odoratissima		M. glabra Nutt. ex Benth.
Monardella odoratissima subsp. parvifolia (Greene) Epling		M. ingrata Greene, M. muriculata Greene, M. parvifolia Greene
Monardella odoratissima subsp. villosa (Benth.) Brunell	M. villosa	M. antonina Hardham, M. antonina subsp. benitensis (Hardham) Jokerst, M. benitensis Hardham, M. coriacea A.Heller, M. globosa Greene, M. involucrata A.Heller, M. mollis A.Heller, M. tomentosa Eastw., M. villosa subsp. globosa (Greene) Jokerst

== Distribution ==
When defined broadly to include Monardella villosa, the species is found in western Northern America, from British Columbia in the north via Colorado, Idaho, Montana, Oregon, Utah, and Washington to Arizona, California and New Mexico in south. It is found in many Northern California mountain ranges, including the Klamath Mountains and the North California Coast Ranges, the Cascade Range, the Sierra Nevada, the Modoc Plateau, White Mountains and Inyo Mountains.

== Cultivation ==
Monardella odoratissima is easy to grow as a garden plant. Although Monardella is in the mint family, most species do not grow from runners. However, they can still be propagated easily from cuttings. They are very attractive to butterflies, which are their main pollinator.

Monardella odoratissima will grow in full sun to medium shade. It can be pruned lightly in the late fall or early winter to create a bushier plant, as it can otherwise be sprawling. It blooms profusely anytime from April through August. Because plants are floriferous, they look best when spent blooms are deadheaded.
