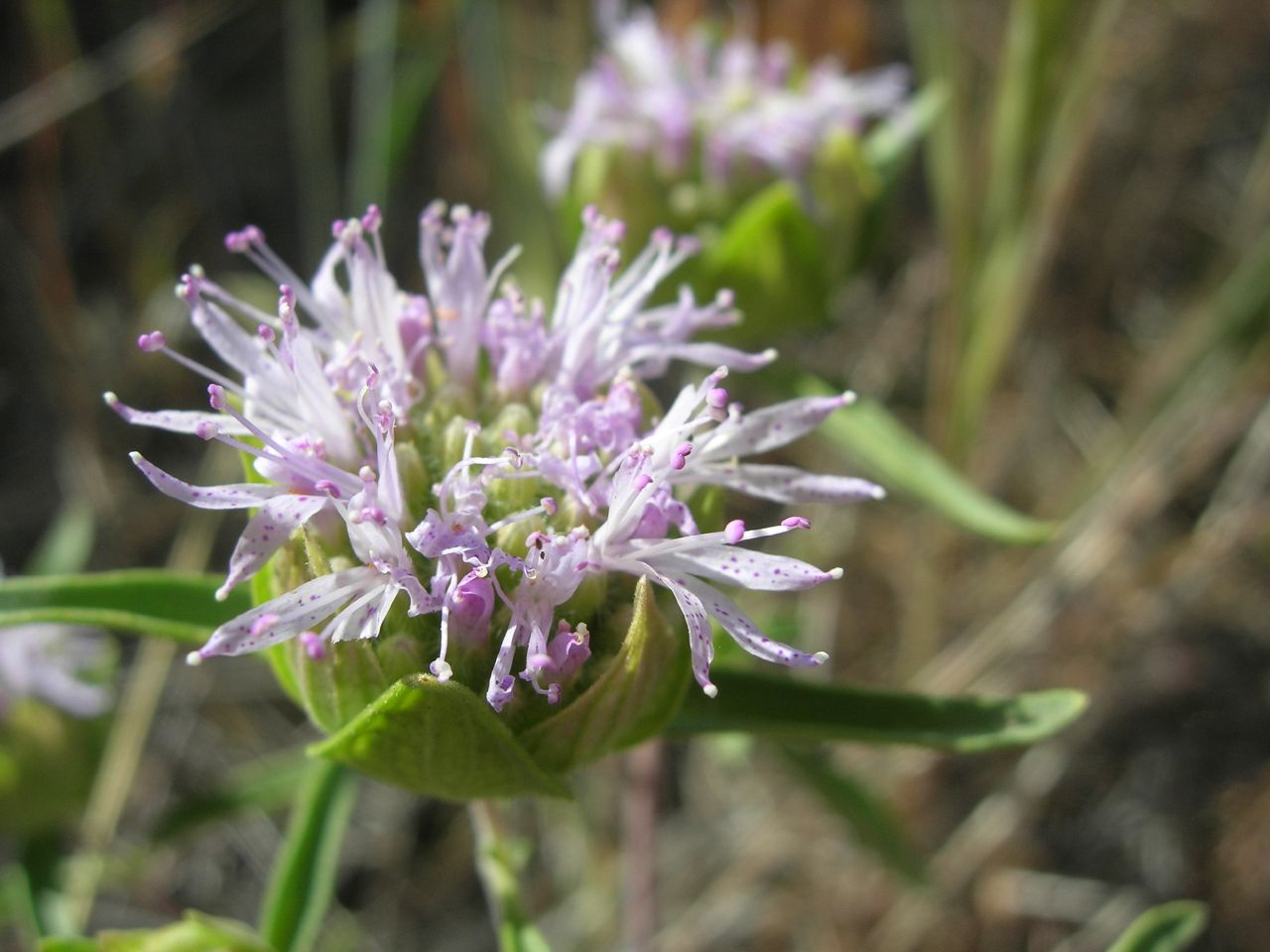

Scientific classification
- Kingdom: Plantae
- Clade: Tracheophytes
- Clade: Angiosperms
- Clade: Eudicots
- Clade: Asterids
- Order: Lamiales
- Family: Lamiaceae
- Genus: Monardella
- Species: M. breweri
- Subspecies: M. b. subsp. lanceolata

Trinomial name
- Monardella breweri subsp. lanceolata (A.Gray) A.C.Sanders & Elvin

Synonymsref name=POWO_77105234-1/>
- Madronella lanceolata (A.Gray) Greene; Madronella sanguinea (Greene) Greene; Monardella lanceolata A.Gray; Monardella lanceolata var. sanguinea Jeps.; Monardella sanguinea Greene

= Monardella breweri subsp. lanceolata =

Species of flowering plant

Monardella breweri subsp. lanceolata, synonym Monardella lanceolata, is a species of flowering plant in the mint family. It is known by the common names mustang mint and mustang monardella. It is native to the mountains of California and Baja California, where it grows in chaparral, woodland, rocky slopes, and often disturbed habitat types.

== Description ==
Monardella breweri subsp. lanceolata is an annual herb producing a branching, purple stem with a coat of glandular hairs. The lance-shaped leaves are 3 or 4 centimeters long and oppositely arranged about the stem. The inflorescence is a head of several flowers blooming in a cup of hairy, pointed, purple-tinged bracts. The flowers are purple in color and roughly 1.5 centimeters long.
