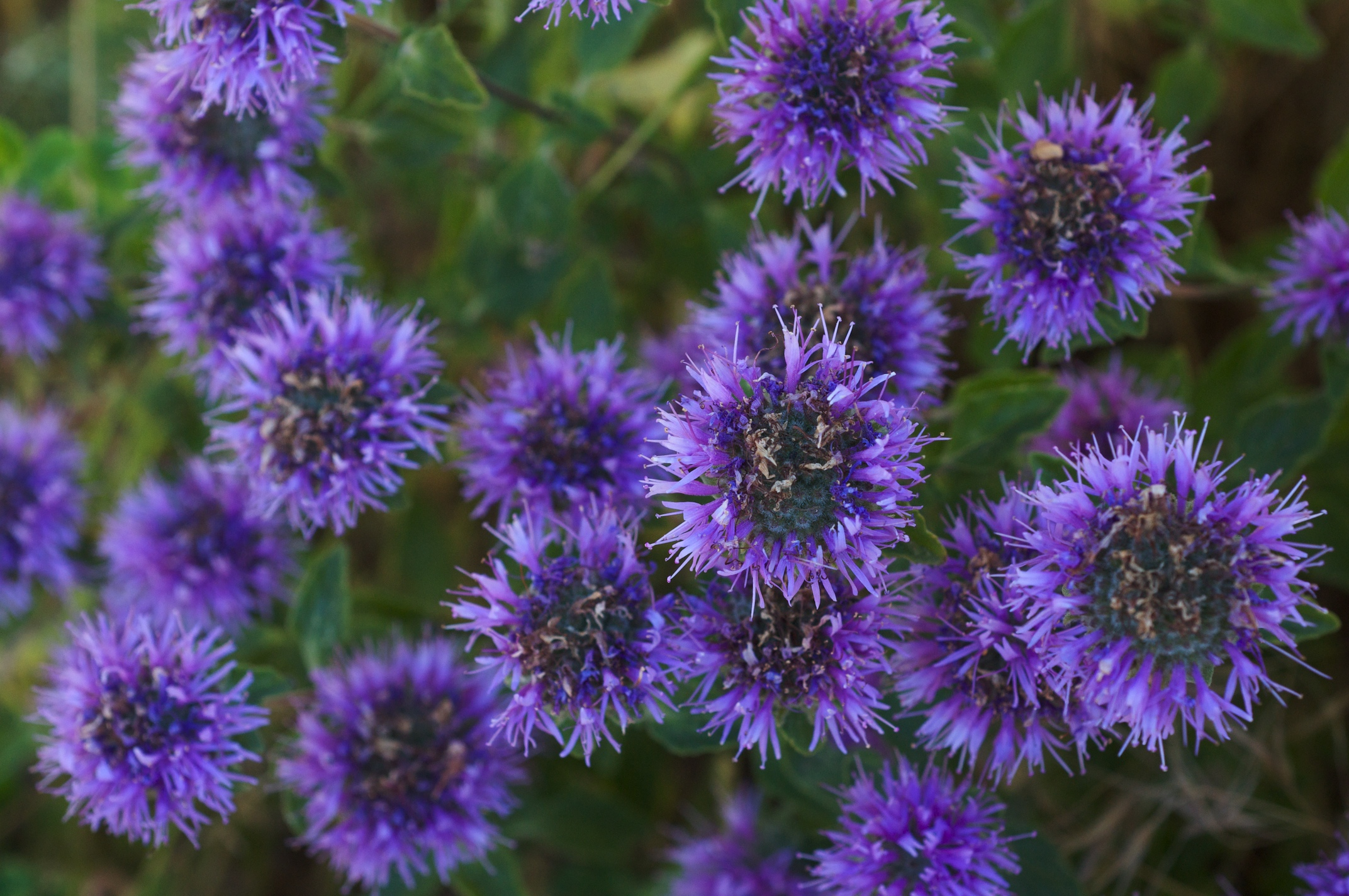

Scientific classification
- Kingdom: Plantae
- Clade: Tracheophytes
- Clade: Angiosperms
- Clade: Eudicots
- Clade: Asterids
- Order: Lamiales
- Family: Lamiaceae
- Genus: Monardella
- Species: M. villosa

Binomial name
- Monardella villosa Benth

= Monardella villosa =

Species of flowering plant

Monardella villosa is a plant in the mint family which is known by the common name coyote mint. In 2020, it was included in Monardella odoratissima. As of April 2024, acceptance of the inclusion varies.

When separated from Monardella odoratissima, it is a perennial wildflower found only in California, except for one subspecies which sometimes occurs in Oregon. It grows in habitats of the California chaparral and woodlands in the California Coast Ranges and Sierra Nevada foothills.

== Description ==
When separated from Monardella odoratissima, Monardella villosa is described as forming a small bush or matted groundcover tangle of hairy mint-scented foliage. It produces rounded inflorescences of small, thready, bright lavender or pink flowers. It is a perennial subshrub and flowers from May to August.

== Taxonomy ==
Monardella villosa was first described by George Bentham in 1844. A 2009 review of the genus Monardella described Monardella villosa as a "complex species", dividing it into three subspecies, each synonymized with taxa that had been described as separate Monardella species.

Studies in preparation for new editions of the Flora of North America and The Jepson Manual showed that there was "continuous variation" between Monardella odoratissima and M. villosa. Characters that had been used to separate the two species varied with location, elevation and soil type. Plants traditionally placed in M. villosa occurred at lower elevations, those placed in M. odoratissima at higher elevations, but there was a wide zone in which the intermediates were found, particularly at middle elevations. Accordingly, the two species were combined under the older name Monardella odoratissima. Former subspecies of M. villosa were given new names in M. odoratissima. As of April 2024, Plants of the World Online accepted the placement of M. villosa within M. odoratissima. Older sources, such as the 2012 Jepson Manual, retain M. villosa as a separate species.

=== Subspecies ===
Three subspecies of Monardella villosa were accepted in 2009 and given names in Monardella odoratissima in 2020:

- Monardella villosa ssp. franciscana, synonym of Monardella odoratissima subsp. franciscana (Elmer) Brunell
- Monardella villosa ssp. obispoensis, synonym of Monardella odoratissima subsp. obispoensis (Hoover) Brunell
- Monardella villosa ssp. villosa, synonym of Monardella odoratissima subsp. villosa (Benth.) Brunell

== Uses ==
The flowers are attractive to butterflies, with the nectar providing a food source for them.

This plant was used by the indigenous peoples of California as a remedy for stomach upset, respiratory conditions, and sore throat. It may also be steeped into a bitter mint tea.

=== Cultivation ===
Monardella villosa is cultivated by specialty plant nurseries and available as an ornamental plant for native plant, drought tolerant, natural landscape, and habitat gardens; and for ecological restoration projects.
