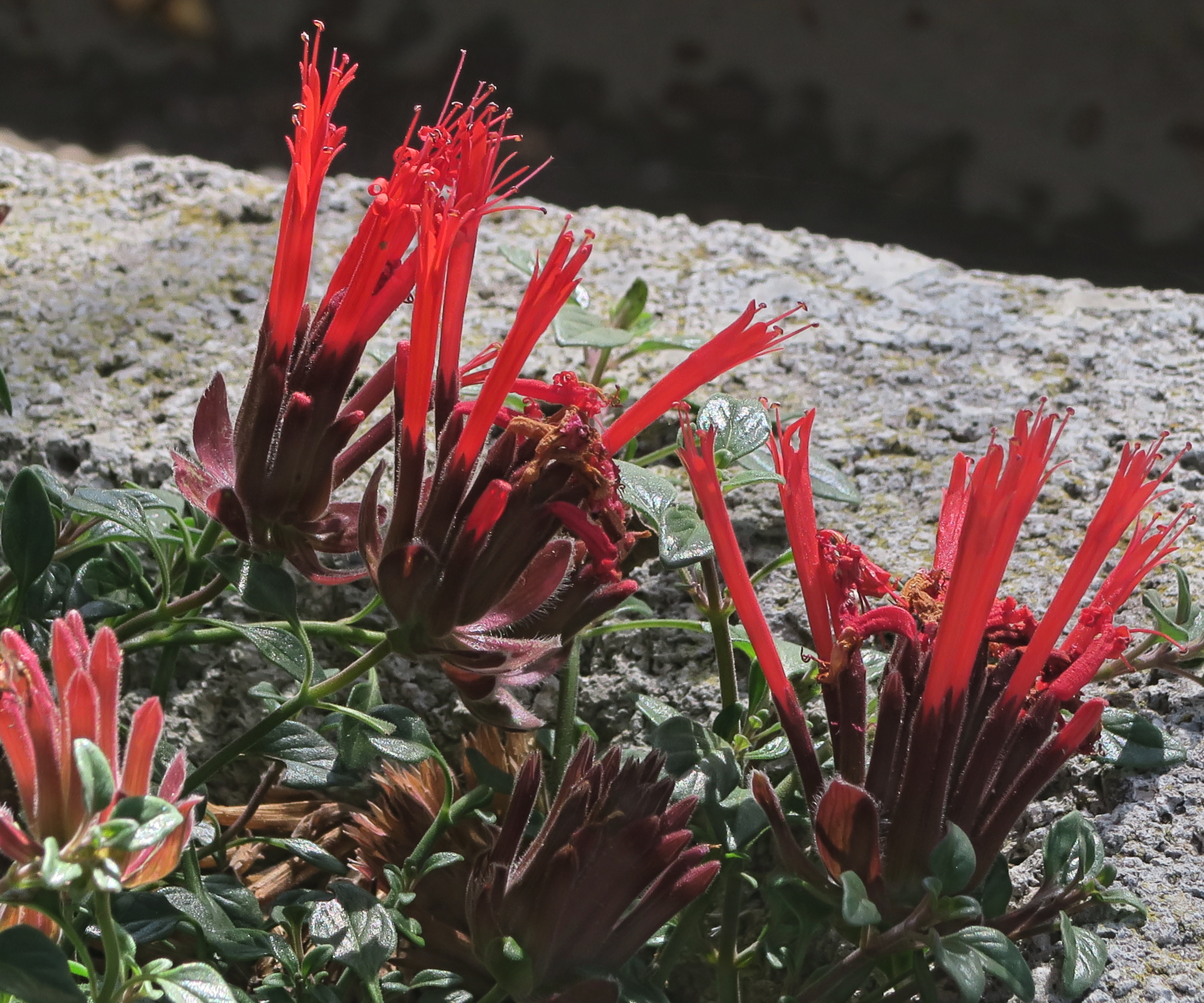

Scientific classification
- Kingdom: Plantae
- Clade: Tracheophytes
- Clade: Angiosperms
- Clade: Eudicots
- Clade: Asterids
- Order: Lamiales
- Family: Lamiaceae
- Genus: Monardella
- Species: M. macrantha

Binomial name
- Monardella macrantha A.Gray

= Monardella macrantha =

Species of flowering plant

Monardella macrantha is a species of flowering plant in the mint family known by the common name red monardella. It is native to coastal mountain ranges of southern California and Baja California, where it grows in several habitat types, including chaparral, woodlands, and forest.

== Description ==
Monardella macrantha is a perennial herb forming a low tuft of slender stems lined with thick, shiny green leaves up to 3 centimeters long. The inflorescence is a head of several tubular flowers blooming in a cup of red-tinged green bracts up to 4 centimeters wide. The clustered flowers are bright red to yellowish in color, sometimes exceeding 4 centimeters in length with narrow lobed mouths.

== Cultivation ==
Monardella macrantha is cultivated in by specialty plant nurseries and available as an ornamental plant for native plant, drought tolerant, natural landscape, and habitat gardens; and for ecological restoration projects.
