= Monardella undulata subsp. crispa =

Conservation status
- Imperiled (NatureServe)

Scientific classification
- Kingdom: Plantae
- Clade: Tracheophytes
- Clade: Angiosperms
- Clade: Eudicots
- Clade: Asterids
- Order: Lamiales
- Family: Lamiaceae
- Genus: Monardella
- Species: M. undulata
- Subspecies: M. u. subsp. crispa

Trinomial name
- Monardella undulata subsp. crispa (Elmer) Elvin & A.C.Sanders

Species of tree

Monardella undulata subsp. crispa, synonym Monardella crispa is a rare subspecies of flowering plant in the mint family known by the common name crisp monardella. It is endemic to California, where it is known only from the sand dunes on the coastline of San Luis Obispo and Santa Barbara Counties.

== Description ==
It is an aromatic perennial herb growing in a spreading woolly mat or mound with one or more stems up to half a meter in length. The fleshy, waxy, sometimes woolly leaves are 1 to 5 centimeters long and borne in clusters along the stem. The inflorescence is a head of several flowers blooming in a cup of papery, hairy purplish to straw-colored bracts. The flowers are purplish pink in color.
