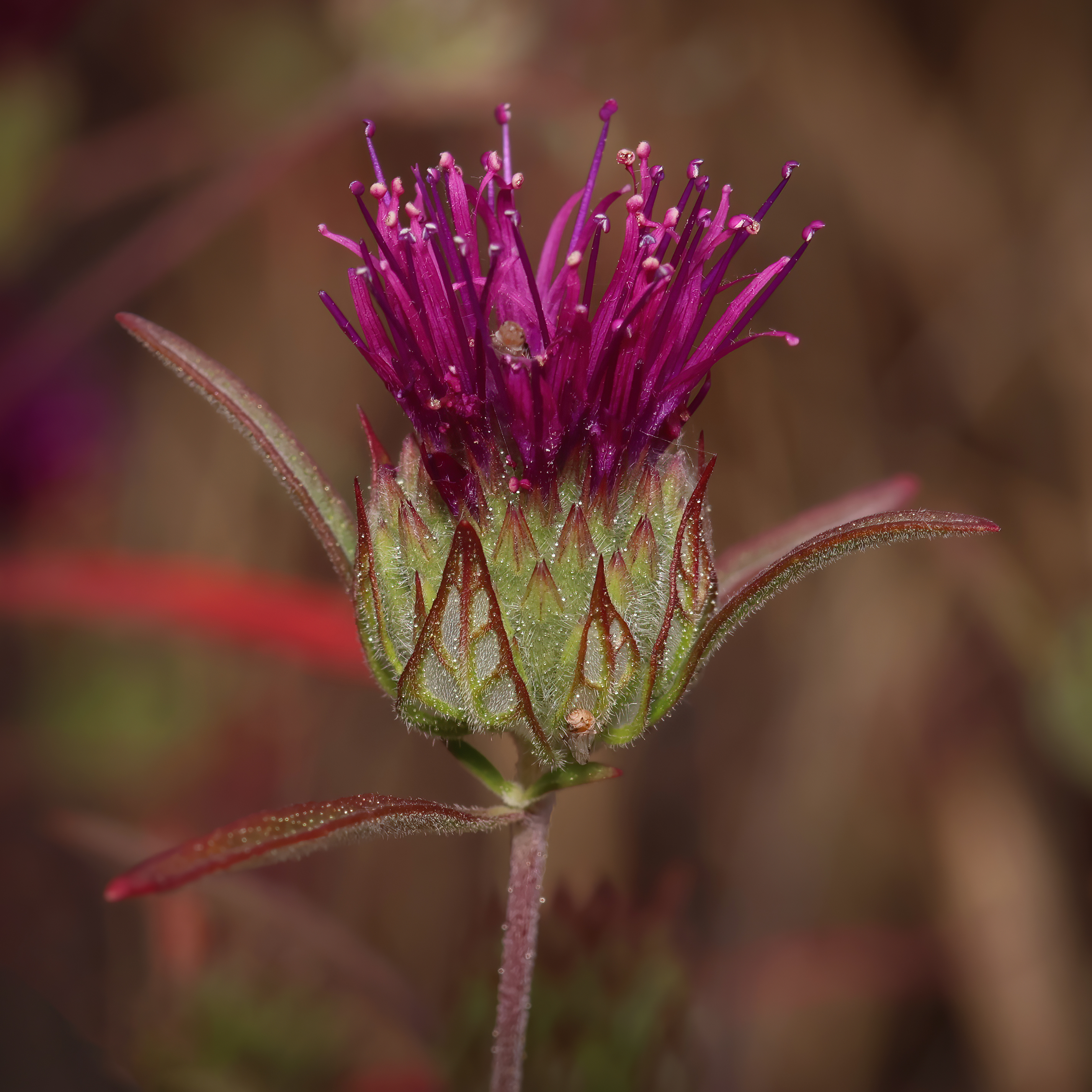

Scientific classification
- Kingdom: Plantae
- Clade: Tracheophytes
- Clade: Angiosperms
- Clade: Eudicots
- Clade: Asterids
- Order: Lamiales
- Family: Lamiaceae
- Genus: Monardella
- Species: M. douglasii

Binomial name
- Monardella douglasii Benth.

= Monardella douglasii =

Species of flowering plant

Monardella douglasii is a species of flowering plant in the mint family known by the common name Douglas' monardella.

== Distribution ==
Monardella douglasii is endemic to northern California, where it is known from several of the Inner Southern California Coast Ranges, including the Diablo Range, and nearby valleys of the southern San Francisco Bay Area.

It can be found in many habitat types, including grassland, chaparral, foothill oak woodland and rocky serpentine slopes.

== Description ==
Monardella douglasii is a hairy annual herb producing a branching purple stem up to about 30 centimeters tall. The oppositely arranged leaves vary in shape.

The inflorescence is a head of several flowers blooming in a cup of green and purple veined, translucent bracts. The purple flowers are just over a centimeter long.

=== Taxonomy ===
A former subspecies, Monardella douglasii ssp. venosa (veiny mondardella), has been reclassified as Monardella venosa.
