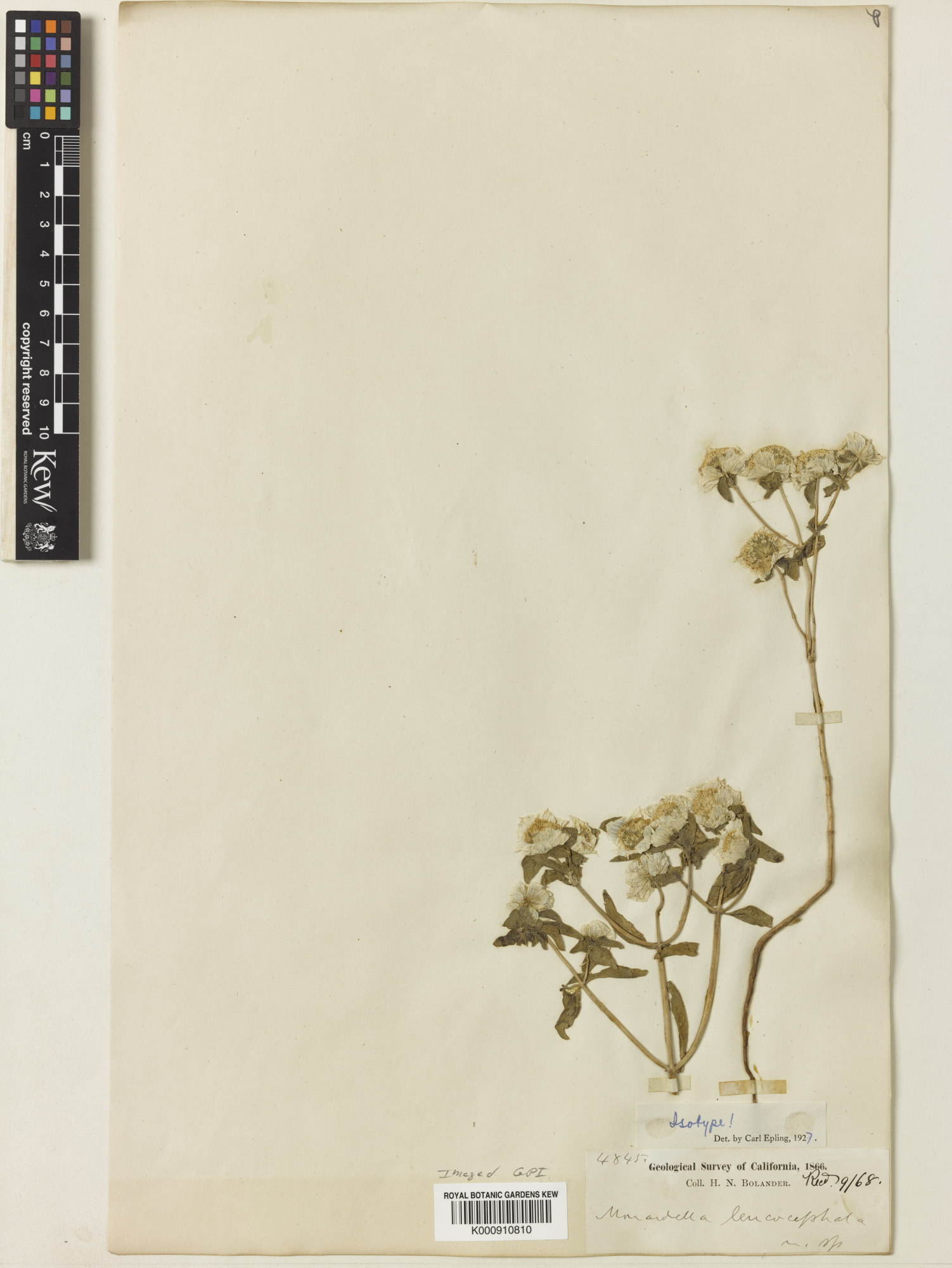

Conservation status
- Presumed Extinct (NatureServe)

Scientific classification
- Kingdom: Plantae
- Clade: Tracheophytes
- Clade: Angiosperms
- Clade: Eudicots
- Clade: Asterids
- Order: Lamiales
- Family: Lamiaceae
- Genus: Monardella
- Species: M. leucocephala

Binomial name
- Monardella leucocephala (A.Gray) Greene

= Monardella leucocephala =

Species of plant

Monardella leucocephala is a believed-to-be-extinct flowering plant in the genus Monardella. The plant has stems 6–8 inches long with small white flowers.
