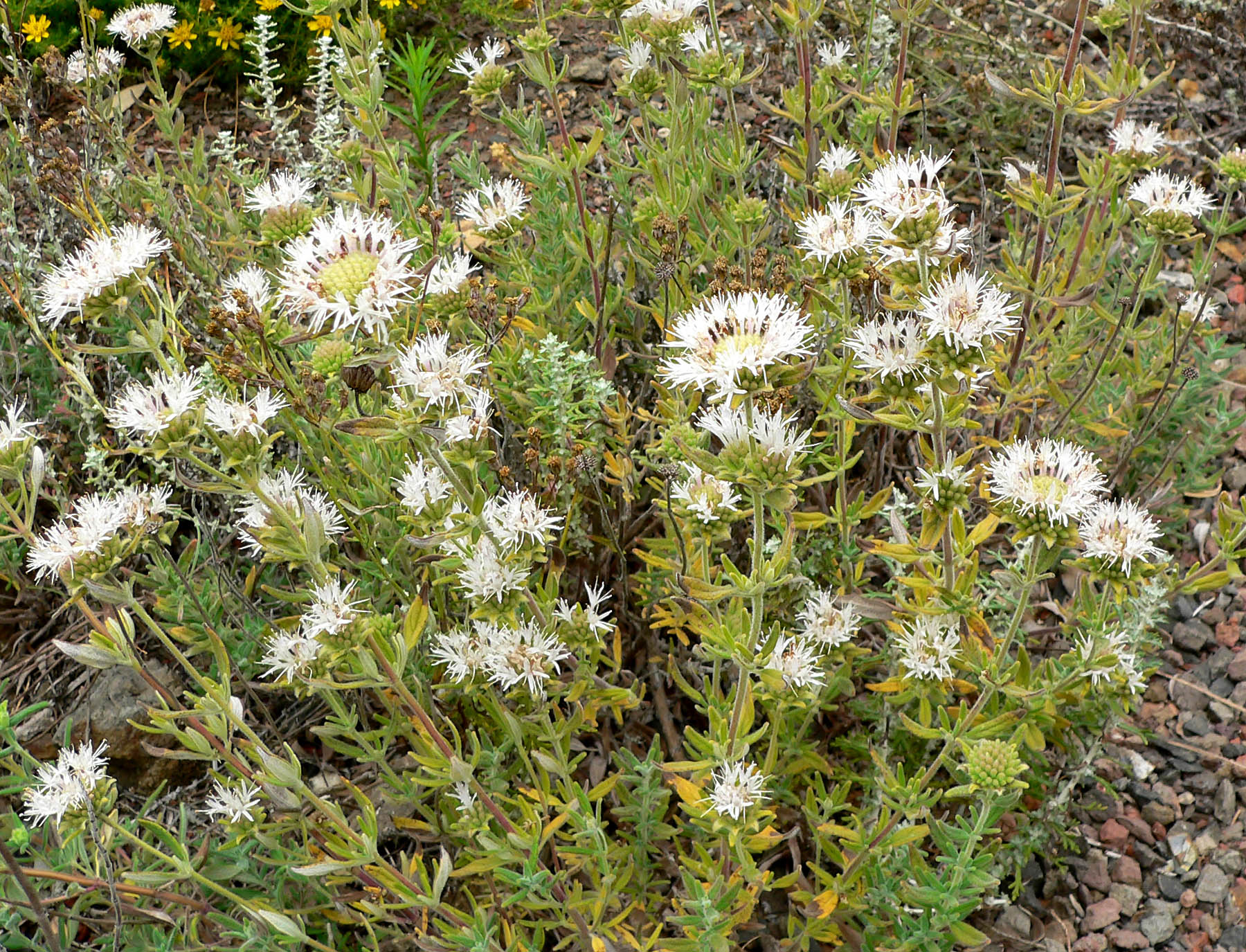
- ssp. lanata

Scientific classification
- Kingdom: Plantae
- Clade: Tracheophytes
- Clade: Angiosperms
- Clade: Eudicots
- Clade: Asterids
- Order: Lamiales
- Family: Lamiaceae
- Genus: Monardella
- Species: M. hypoleuca

Binomial name
- Monardella hypoleuca A.Gray

= Monardella hypoleuca =

Species of flowering plant

Monardella hypoleuca is a species of flowering plant in the mint family, known by the common names thickleaf monardella and white leaf monardella.

It is endemic to Southern California, It grows on the coastal hills and slopes of the Peninsular Ranges and Transverse Ranges, in chaparral and oak woodland habitats of the California chaparral and woodlands ecoregion.

== Description ==
Monardella hypoleuca is a perennial herb producing an erect, purple stem coated in short hairs. The green, lance-shaped to oval leaves are oppositely arranged about the stem and have woolly white undersides.

The inflorescence is a head of several flowers blooming in a cup of woolly-haired purplish bracts 2 to 4 centimeters wide. The flowers are roughly 1.5 centimeters long and white or purple-tinged.

=== Subspecies ===
Subspecies include:

- Monardella hypoleuca subsp. hypoleuca — endemic from Orange County north to Santa Barbara County.
- Monardella hypoleuca ssp. intermedia — endemic to the Santa Ana Mountains.
- Monardella hypoleuca ssp. lanata — feltleaf monardella, endemic to the Peninsular Ranges including the Cuyamaca Mountains, within San Diego County.

== See also ==
- Endemic flora of California
- Natural history of the California chaparral and woodlands
