= Monardella beneolens =

Conservation status
- Critically Imperiled (NatureServe)

Scientific classification
- Kingdom: Plantae
- Clade: Tracheophytes
- Clade: Angiosperms
- Clade: Eudicots
- Clade: Asterids
- Order: Lamiales
- Family: Lamiaceae
- Genus: Monardella
- Species: M. beneolens

Binomial name
- Monardella beneolens Shevock, Ertter & Jokerst

Species of flowering plant

Monardella beneolens is a rare species of flowering plant in the mint family known by the common name sweet-smelling monardella.

== Distribution ==
Monardella beneolens is endemic to California, where it is known from just a few occurrences in the high peaks of the southern Sierra Nevada. Its habitat includes subalpine mountain forests and alpine rock fields.

Although the plant is rare, it is not likely to experience disturbance or destruction because it lives in such remote habitat.

== Description ==
Monardella beneolens is a hairy, glandular rhizomatous perennial herb growing in a mat or small tuft and producing flowering stems 10 to 30 centimeters long. The long-haired, triangular or oval leaves are under a centimeter long and usually wavy along the edges. The inflorescence is a head of several flowers blooming in a cup of pinkish or pale green bracts. The five-lobed flowers are lavender or pink.
