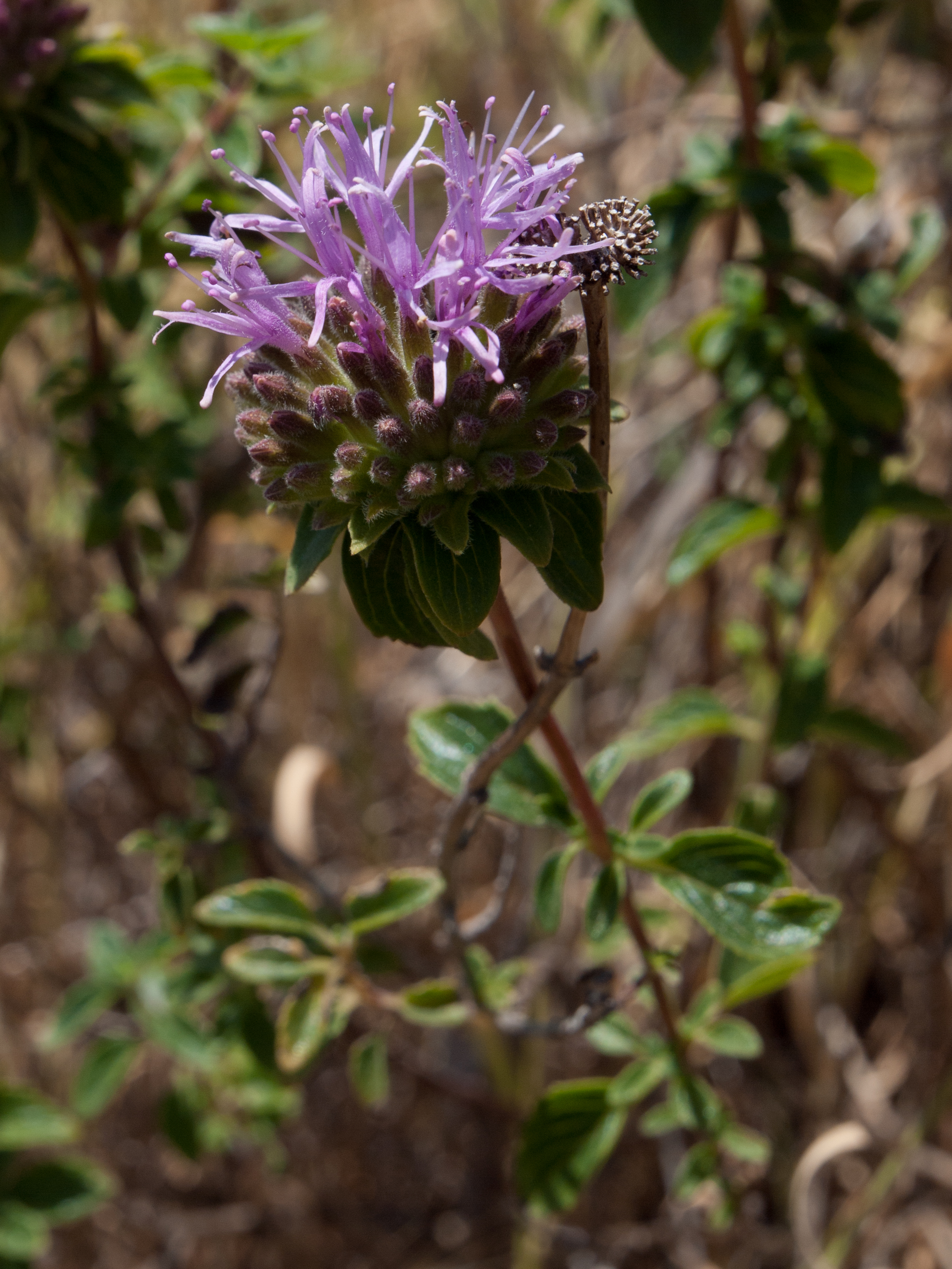

Scientific classification
- Kingdom: Plantae
- Clade: Tracheophytes
- Clade: Angiosperms
- Clade: Eudicots
- Clade: Asterids
- Order: Lamiales
- Family: Lamiaceae
- Genus: Monardella
- Species: M. odoratissima
- Subspecies: M. o. subsp. villosa

Trinomial name
- Monardella odoratissima subsp. villosa (Benth.) Brunell

Synonyms
- List: Madronella coriacea (A.Heller) A.Heller; Madronella globosa (Greene) Greene; Madronella involucrata (A.Heller) A.Heller; Madronella mollis (A.Heller) A.Heller; Madronella villosa (Benth.) Greene; Monardella antonina Hardham; Monardella antonina subsp. benitensis (Hardham) Jokerst; Monardella benitensis Hardham; Monardella coriacea A.Heller; Monardella globosa Greene; Monardella involucrata A.Heller; Monardella mollis A.Heller; Monardella tomentosa Eastw.; Monardella villosa Benth.; Monardella villosa subsp. euvillosa Epling, not validly publ.; Monardella villosa subsp. globosa (Greene) Jokerst

= Monardella odoratissima subsp. villosa =

Subspecies of flowering plant

Monardella odoratissima subsp. villosa, many synonyms including Monardella antonina and Monardella villosa subsp. villosa, is subspecies of flowering plant in the mint family. When treated as the species Monardella antonina, it is known by the common name San Antonio Hills monardella. It is endemic to northern and central California.

== Description ==
Monardella odoratissima subsp. villosa is an upright plant, growing to a maximum height of 50 cm (1 ft 8 in). It has wavy, soft hairs, more or less densely covering the plant. The leaves are 10–22 mm (0.4–0.9 in) long, less hairy on the underside. The inflorescence which appears from May to August is a cluster of flowers 10–30 mm (0.4–1.2 in) across with leaflike outer bracts 8–20 mm (0.3–0.8 in) long. The flowers have pink to purple petals.

== Taxonomy ==
The taxonomic status of some Monardella species varies as of April 2024. In 2009, a number of species of Monardella, including M. antonina, M. benitensis and M. globosa, were synonymized with Monardella villosa subsp. villosa. The 2012 Jepson Manual treats the taxon under this name.

In 2020, it was proposed that Monardella villosa should be sunk into Monardella odoratissima, a proposal accepted by Plants of the World Online as of April 2024. In this treatment, Monardella villosa and its subspecies villosa become M. odoratissima subsp. villosa.

== Distribution and habitat ==
Monardella odoratissima subsp. villosa is endemic to the coastal mountain ranges of central and northern California. It is found at elevations up to 1,300 m (4,300 ft) in a variety of habitats, including rocky slopes, temporary wet areas, oak woodland, chaparral, and montane forest.
