= Monardella palmeri =

Conservation status
- Imperiled (NatureServe)

Scientific classification
- Kingdom: Plantae
- Clade: Tracheophytes
- Clade: Angiosperms
- Clade: Eudicots
- Clade: Asterids
- Order: Lamiales
- Family: Lamiaceae
- Genus: Monardella
- Species: M. palmeri

Binomial name
- Monardella palmeri A.Gray

Species of flowering plant

Monardella palmeri is a species of flowering plant in the mint family known by the common name Palmer's monardella.

== Distribution ==
Monardella palmeri is endemic to California, where it is known only from the Santa Lucia Mountains of the California Coast Ranges in Monterey and San Luis Obispo Counties. It grows in local habitat types such as chaparral and forest, often on serpentine soils.

== Description ==
Monardella palmeri is a rhizomatous perennial herb forming a tuft of slender, decumbent purplish stems up to about 30 centimeters long. The leathery lance-shaped leaves are 1 to 2 centimeters long.

The inflorescence is a head of several flowers blooming in a cup of leathery purple bracts roughly 3 centimeters wide. The pinkish purple flowers are up to 2 centimeters long with tips divided into five narrow lobes.
