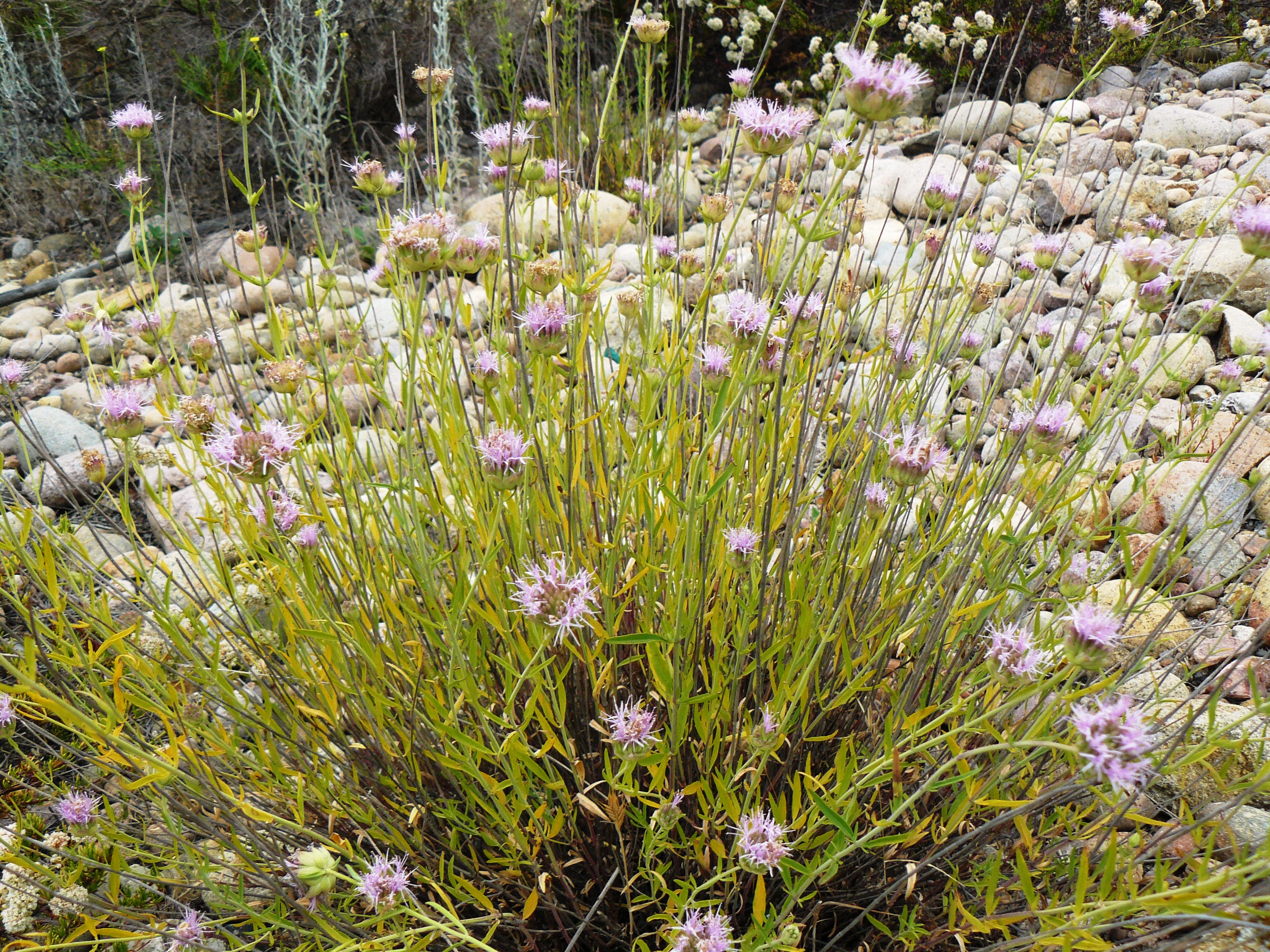

Conservation status
- Endangered (ESA)

Scientific classification
- Kingdom: Plantae
- Clade: Tracheophytes
- Clade: Angiosperms
- Clade: Eudicots
- Clade: Asterids
- Order: Lamiales
- Family: Lamiaceae
- Genus: Monardella
- Species: M. viminea

Binomial name
- Monardella viminea Greene

= Monardella viminea =

Species of flowering plant

Monardella viminea is a species of flowering plant in the mint family known by the common name willowy monardella.

It is endemic to coastal San Diego County, within the City of San Diego, in southern California. The plant is native to coastal sage scrub habitats of the California chaparral and woodlands ecoregion .

== Conservation ==
Monardella viminea is a federal and state listed Endangered species, and a Critically Imperiled species on the California Native Plant Society Inventory of Rare and Endangered Plants. It is seriously threatened by urbanization, hydrological alterations, road improvements, vehicles, and invasive species of plants.
