= Monardella candicans =

Scientific classification
- Kingdom: Plantae
- Clade: Tracheophytes
- Clade: Angiosperms
- Clade: Eudicots
- Clade: Asterids
- Order: Lamiales
- Family: Lamiaceae
- Genus: Monardella
- Species: M. candicans

Binomial name
- Monardella candicans Benth.

Species of flowering plant

Monardella candicans is a species of flowering plant in the mint family known by the common name Sierra monardella.

== Distribution ==
It is endemic to the Sierra Nevada foothills of California, where it grows in several types of local habitat, including chaparral, woodland, and forests.

== Description ==
Monardella candicans is an annual herb producing a purple stem with lance-shaped green leaves arranged oppositely. The inflorescence is a head of several flowers blooming in a cup of green, veined bracts. Each five-lobed flower is white, sometimes with purple speckles, and roughly an inch long.
