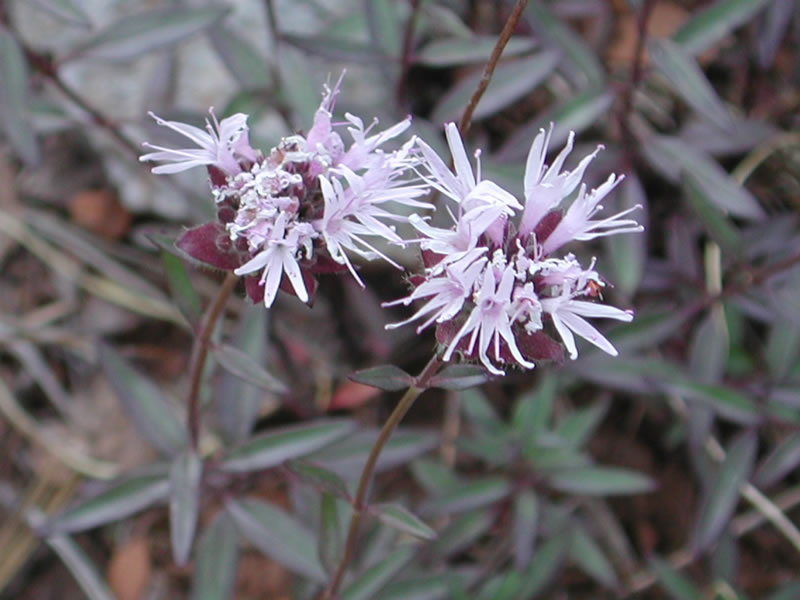

Conservation status
- Imperiled (NatureServe)

Scientific classification
- Kingdom: Plantae
- Clade: Tracheophytes
- Clade: Angiosperms
- Clade: Eudicots
- Clade: Asterids
- Order: Lamiales
- Family: Lamiaceae
- Genus: Monardella
- Species: M. follettii

Binomial name
- Monardella follettii (Jeps.) Jokerst

= Monardella follettii =

Species of flowering plant

Monardella follettii is an uncommon species of flowering plant in the mint family known by the common name Follett's monardella.

== Distribution ==
Monardella follettii is endemic to California, where it is known from about twenty occurrences in the northern High Sierra Nevada, mostly in Plumas County — in the Lassen National Forest.

It grows in rocky mountain forests and slopes, sometimes on serpentine soils.

== Description ==
Monardella follettii is a perennial herb producing a slender erect stem which is purple in color and mostly hairless in texture. The lance-shaped, smooth-edged leaves are oppositely arranged about the stem.

The inflorescence is a head of several pink flowers blooming in a cup of leathery, hairy, glandular bracts.
