= Monardella australis =

Scientific classification
- Kingdom: Plantae
- Clade: Tracheophytes
- Clade: Angiosperms
- Clade: Eudicots
- Clade: Asterids
- Order: Lamiales
- Family: Lamiaceae
- Genus: Monardella
- Species: M. australis

Binomial name
- Monardella australis Abrams, 1912

Species of flowering plant

Monardella australis is a species of flowering plant in the mint family, known by the common name southern monardella.

== Distribution ==
The plant is endemic to southern California, in the Greater Los Angeles Area. It is known only from populations in the San Gabriel Mountains and San Bernardino Mountains of the eastern Transverse Ranges, and the adjacent San Jacinto Mountains of the Peninsular Ranges.

Its habitats include the red fir forest and yellow pine forest on the higher slopes of the ranges.

== Description ==
Monardella australis is a perennial herb growing in a small tuft and producing long, sometimes erect flowering stems. The pale green or grayish leaves are oval or lance-shaped and often toothed.

The inflorescence is a head of several flowers blooming in a cup of pinkish green bracts. Each flower is up to 2 centimeters long and pinkish in color.

=== Subspecies ===
Subspecies include:

- Monardella australis subsp. australis
- Monardella australis subsp. cinerea — endemic to San Gabriel Mountains, formerly Monardella cinerea.
- Monardella australis ssp. jokerstii — endemic to eastern San Gabriel Mountains, critically endangered species (as subspecies).
