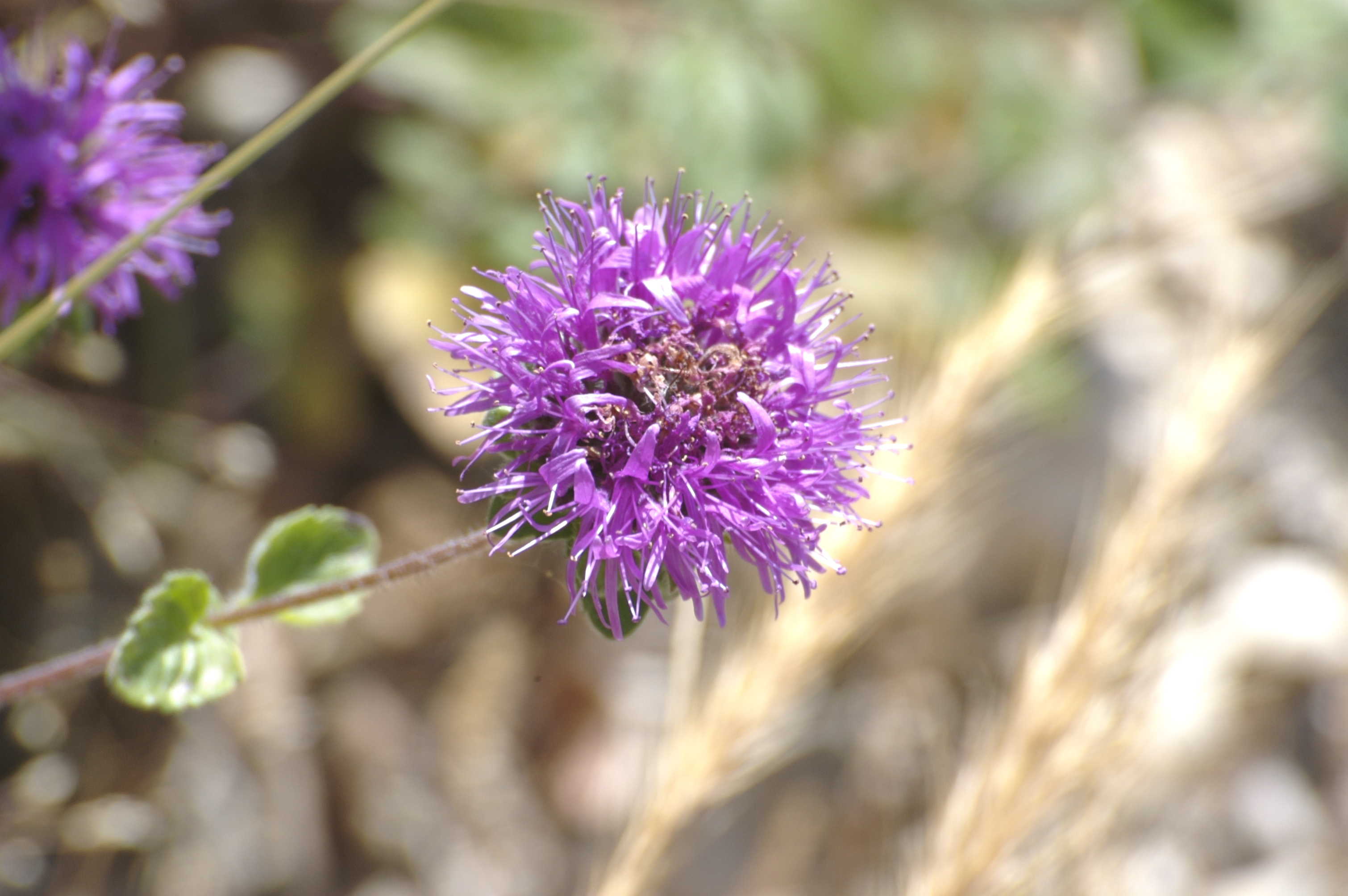

Scientific classification
- Kingdom: Plantae
- Clade: Tracheophytes
- Clade: Angiosperms
- Clade: Eudicots
- Clade: Asterids
- Order: Lamiales
- Family: Lamiaceae
- Genus: Monardella
- Species: M. undulata

Binomial name
- Monardella undulata Benth.

= Monardella undulata =

Species of flowering plant

Monardella undulata is an uncommon species of flowering plant in the mint family known by the common name curlyleaf monardella. It is an annual herb and is endemic to the coast of California.

== Description ==
Monardella undulata grows as a small shrub up to 2.5 m (8 ft) across. Its branched stems are 10–100 cm (4 in – 3 ft 3 in) long, and vary from sparsely hairy to being covered with dense, matted, woolly hairs giving a white appearance (tomentose). Its leaves may be fleshy and are located in clusters along the stem. The flowers are strongly scented, arranged in terminal spikes, 10–30 mm (0.4–1.2 in) wide, and vary from straw-colored through lavender to rose-purple.

=== Subspecies ===
Subspecies include:

- Monardella undulata subsp. arguelloensis — endemic to Point Arguello in Santa Barbara County.
- Monardella undulata subsp. crispa — endemic to coastal sage scrub habitats of northern Santa Barbara County and southern San Luis Obispo County.
- Monardella undulata subsp. undulata — endemic to coastal sage scrub habitats of northern Santa Barbara and southern San Luis Obispo Counties.

== Distribution and habitat ==
It is endemic to the coast of California from Sonoma to Santa Barbara Counties, where it is known from several coastal habitat types, including dunes, coastal sage scrub, chaparral, and forest.

== Conservation ==
The plant is threatened by forces that degrade its coastline habitat, such as sand mining and competing introduced plant species.

This species is an important food plant for the endangered Myrtle's silverspot butterfly (Speyeria zerene myrtleae), which eats its nectar.
