= Monardella mojavensis =

Conservation status
- Imperiled (NatureServe)

Scientific classification
- Kingdom: Plantae
- Clade: Tracheophytes
- Clade: Angiosperms
- Clade: Eudicots
- Clade: Asterids
- Order: Lamiales
- Family: Lamiaceae
- Genus: Monardella
- Species: M. mojavensis

Binomial name
- Monardella mojavensis Elvin & A.C. Sanders

Species of flowering plant

Monardella mojavensis is a rare species of flowering plant in the mint family.

== Description ==
Monardella mojavensis is an annual herb consisting of erect woody stems lined with small elliptical gray-green or silvery leaves up to 20 mm (0.79 in) long and 4 mm (0.16 in) wide. The inflorescence consists of 3 to 7 flowers per cluster surrounded by bracts that are green and leaf-like as they grow outward. The flowers are white with purple markings, and about 10 to 11 mm (0.39 to 0.43 in) long. The plant grows to about 30 to 60 cm (12 to 24 in) tall and flowers from May to August.

== Distribution and habitat ==
The plant is native to the Mojave Desert in California and southwestern Nevada. It can be found in several of the region's major habitats, from the desert riparian scrub and mixed desert scrub at lower elevations to the pinyon-juniper woodlands at higher elevations. It has been found from 800 to 1,500 m (2,600 to 4,900 ft) in altitude. The plant grows in both granite and limestone soil, and often sits in crevices between granite boulders or on ledges of rock.
