= Monardella siskiyouensis =

Scientific classification
- Kingdom: Plantae
- Clade: Tracheophytes
- Clade: Angiosperms
- Clade: Eudicots
- Clade: Asterids
- Order: Lamiales
- Family: Lamiaceae
- Genus: Monardella
- Species: M. siskiyouensis

Binomial name
- Monardella siskiyouensis Hardham

Species of flowering plant

Monardella siskiyouensis is an uncommon species of flowering plant in the mint family known by the common name Siskiyou monardella.

It is endemic to the southern Klamath Mountains of California, where it grows in chaparral and woodland habitat.

== Description ==
Monardella siskiyouensis is a perennial herb producing an erect, glandular and hairy stem lined with pairs of oppositely arranged oval leaves. The inflorescence is a head of several flowers blooming in a small cup of rough-haired, leaflike bracts. The purple flowers have five lobes and protruding stamens.
