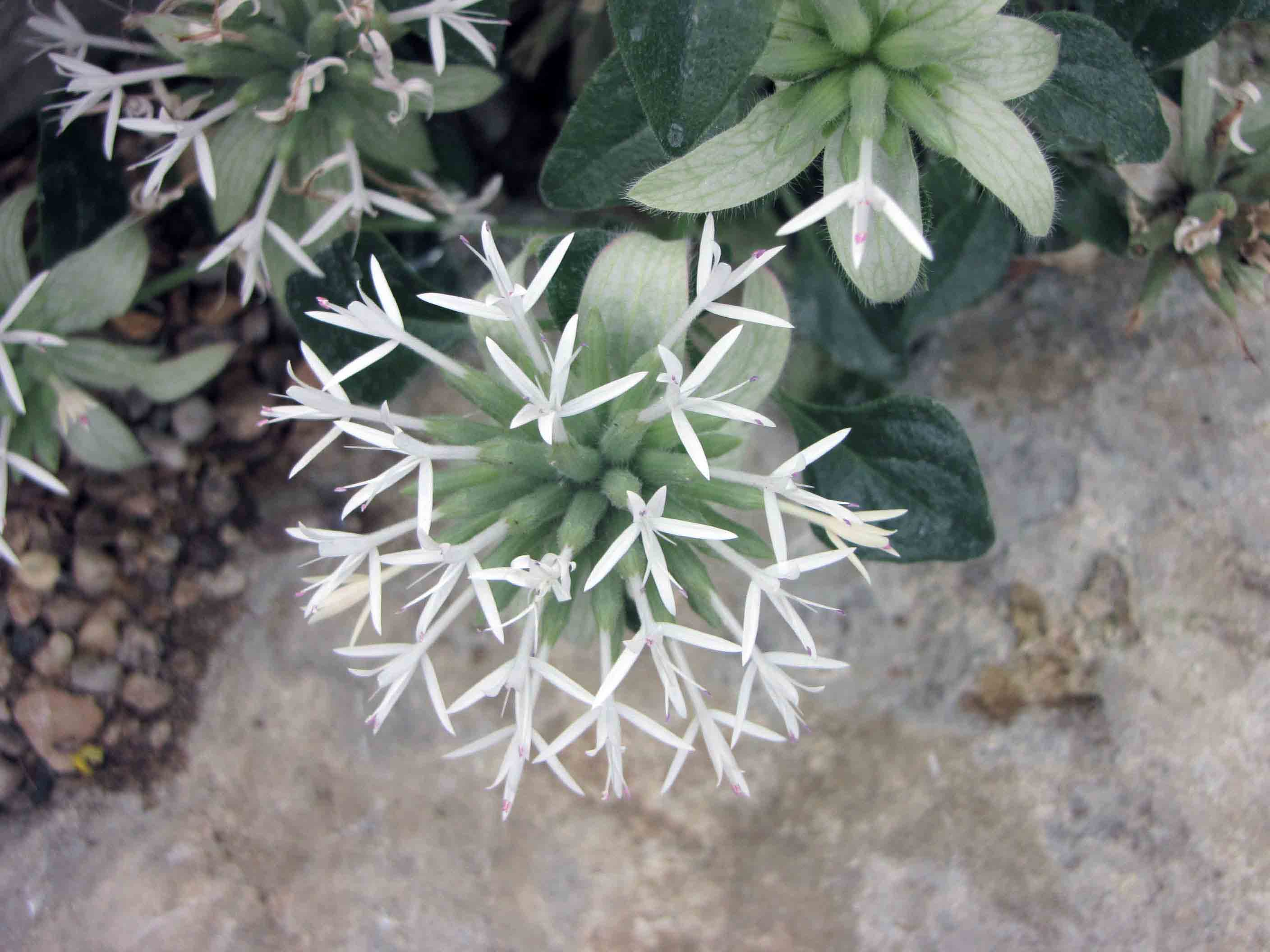

Scientific classification
- Kingdom: Plantae
- Clade: Tracheophytes
- Clade: Angiosperms
- Clade: Eudicots
- Clade: Asterids
- Order: Lamiales
- Family: Lamiaceae
- Genus: Monardella
- Species: M. nana

Binomial name
- Monardella nana A.Gray

= Monardella nana =

Species of flowering plant

Monardella nana is a species of flowering plant in the mint family known by the common name yellow monardella. It is native to the Peninsular Ranges of southern California and northern Baja California, where it grows in several local habitat types, such as chaparral and mountain forest.

== Description ==
Monardella nana is a rhizomatous perennial herb forming a tuft or mat of slender stems lined with hairy to hairless oval leaves up to 3 centimeters long. The inflorescence is a head of several flowers blooming in a cup of pink-tinged white bracts. The tubular flowers are white to pale pink in color and up to 3 centimeters long.

There are several subspecies of this plant, all limited to the mountains straddling the border between California and Baja California.
