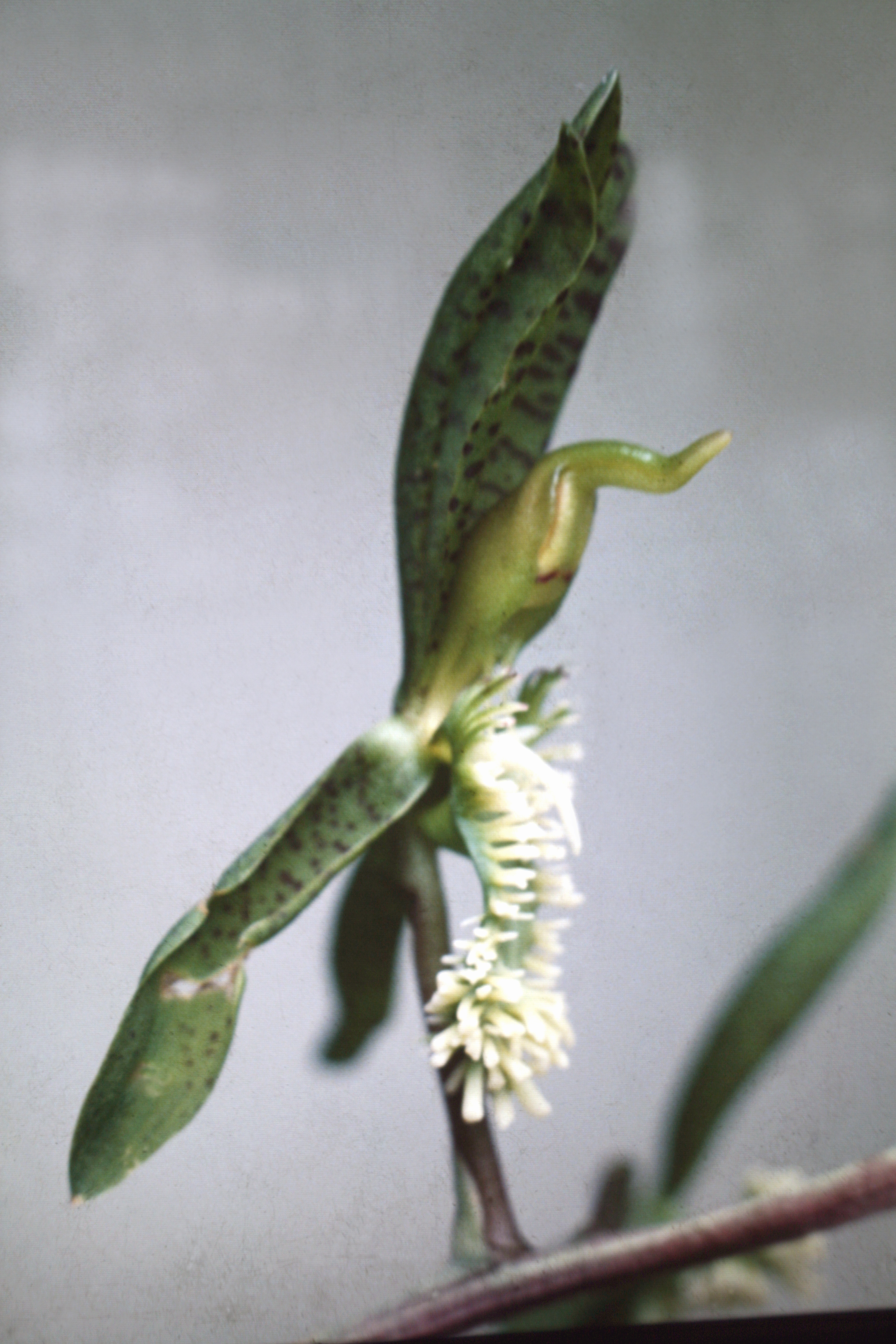
- Male flower

Scientific classification
- Kingdom: Plantae
- Clade: Tracheophytes
- Clade: Angiosperms
- Clade: Monocots
- Order: Asparagales
- Family: Orchidaceae
- Subfamily: Epidendroideae
- Genus: Catasetum
- Species: C. barbatum

Binomial name
- Catasetum barbatum (Lindl.) Lindl. (1844)

Synonyms
- Myanthus barbatus Lindl. (1835) (Basionym); Monachanthus viridis M.R. Schomb. (1837); Myanthus barbatus var. immaculatus Knowles & Westc. (1837); Catasetum proboscideum Lindl. (1839); Catasetum spinosum (Hook.) Lindl. (1840); Myanthus spinosus Hook. (1840); Catasetum comosum Cogn. (1895); Catasetum brachybulbon Schltr. (1925); Catasetum polydactylon Schltr. (1925); Catasetum buchtienii Kraenzl. (1928)

= Catasetum barbatum =

Species of orchid from South America

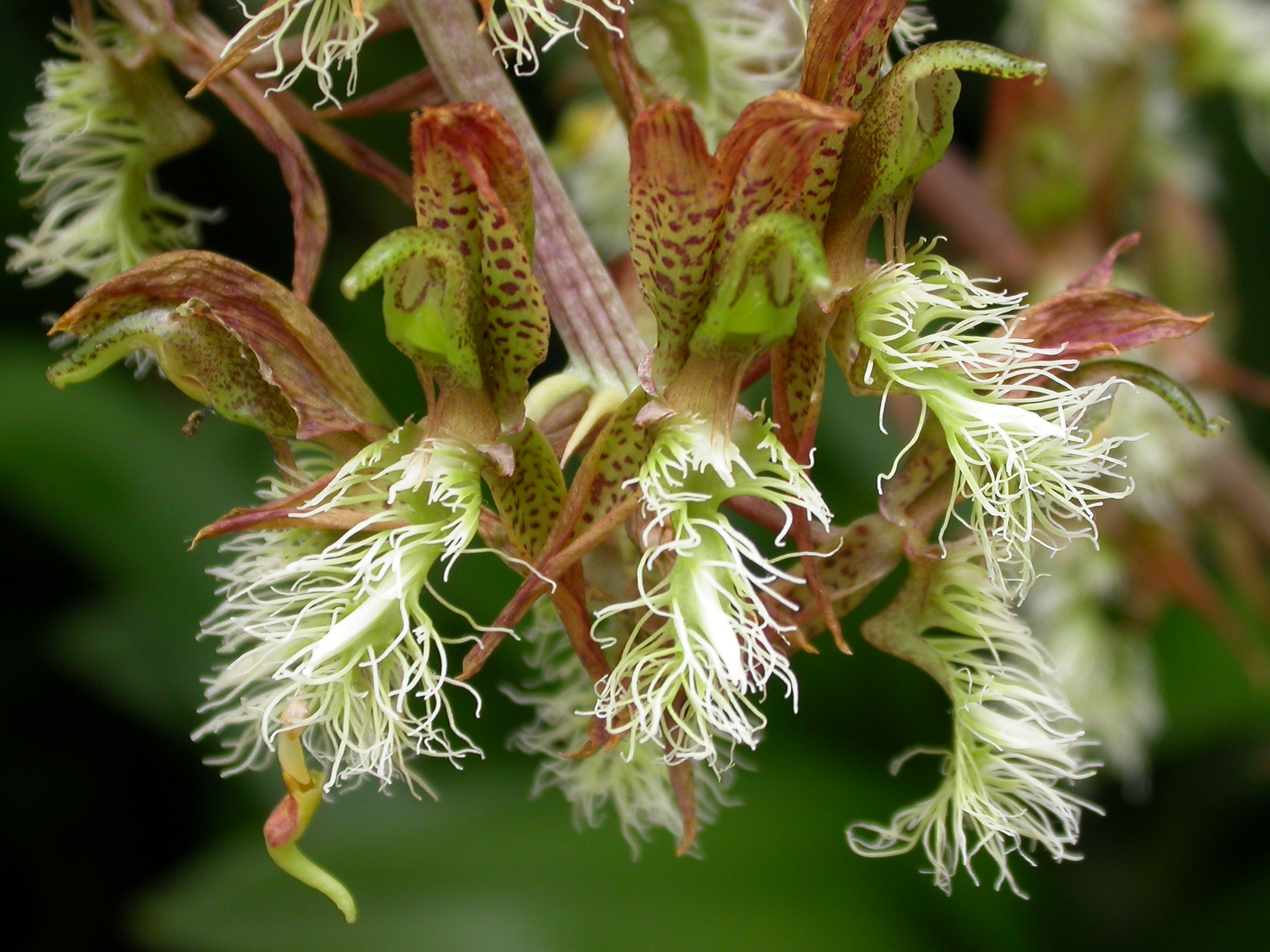
Catasetum barbatum

Catasetum barbatum, the bearded catasetum, is a species of orchid. It occurs commonly in Amazonas and central Brazil. It is found in a wide variety of open, lowland habitats, mostly riparian. It is unique in having male, female, and hermaphroditic flowers, pollinated by male euglossine bees.
