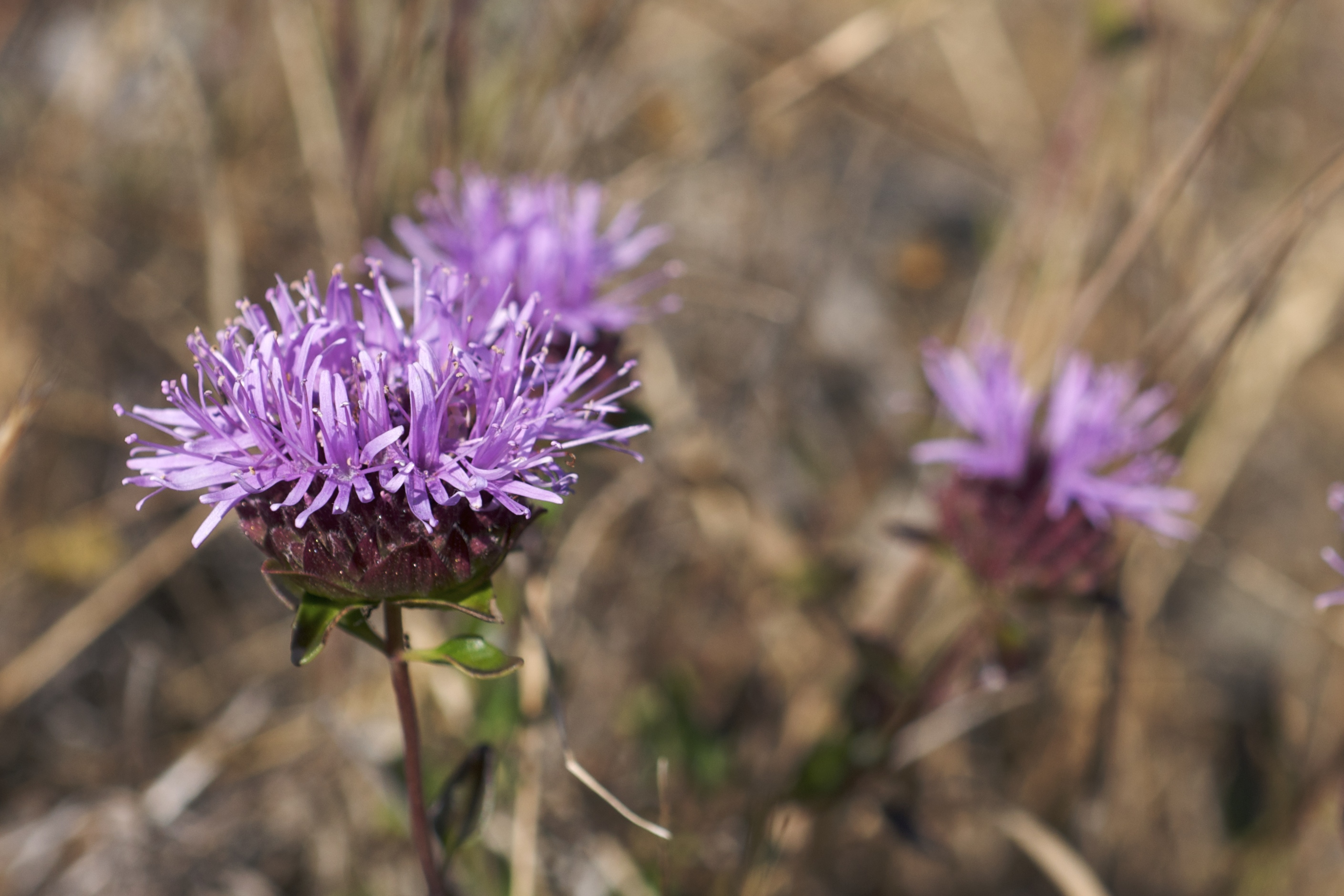

Scientific classification
- Kingdom: Plantae
- Clade: Tracheophytes
- Clade: Angiosperms
- Clade: Eudicots
- Clade: Asterids
- Order: Lamiales
- Family: Lamiaceae
- Genus: Monardella
- Species: M. purpurea

Binomial name
- Monardella purpurea Howell

= Monardella purpurea =

Species of flowering plant

Monardella purpurea is a species of flowering plant in the mint family known by the common names Siskiyou monardella and serpentine monardella.

It is native to the mountains of northern California and southern Oregon, including the Klamath Mountains. It grows in rocky slopes, chaparral, woodlands, montane forests and serpentine soils.

== Description ==
It is a perennial herb producing an erect, purple stem up to about 40 centimeters in maximum height. The oppositely arranged leaves are leathery, widely lance-shaped, and up to 3 centimeters long.

The inflorescence is a head of several flowers blooming in a cup of leathery purplish bracts. The pinkish purple flowers are just over a centimeter long, narrow and tubular in shape with pointed lobes and protruding stamens. Flowers bloom June to July.
