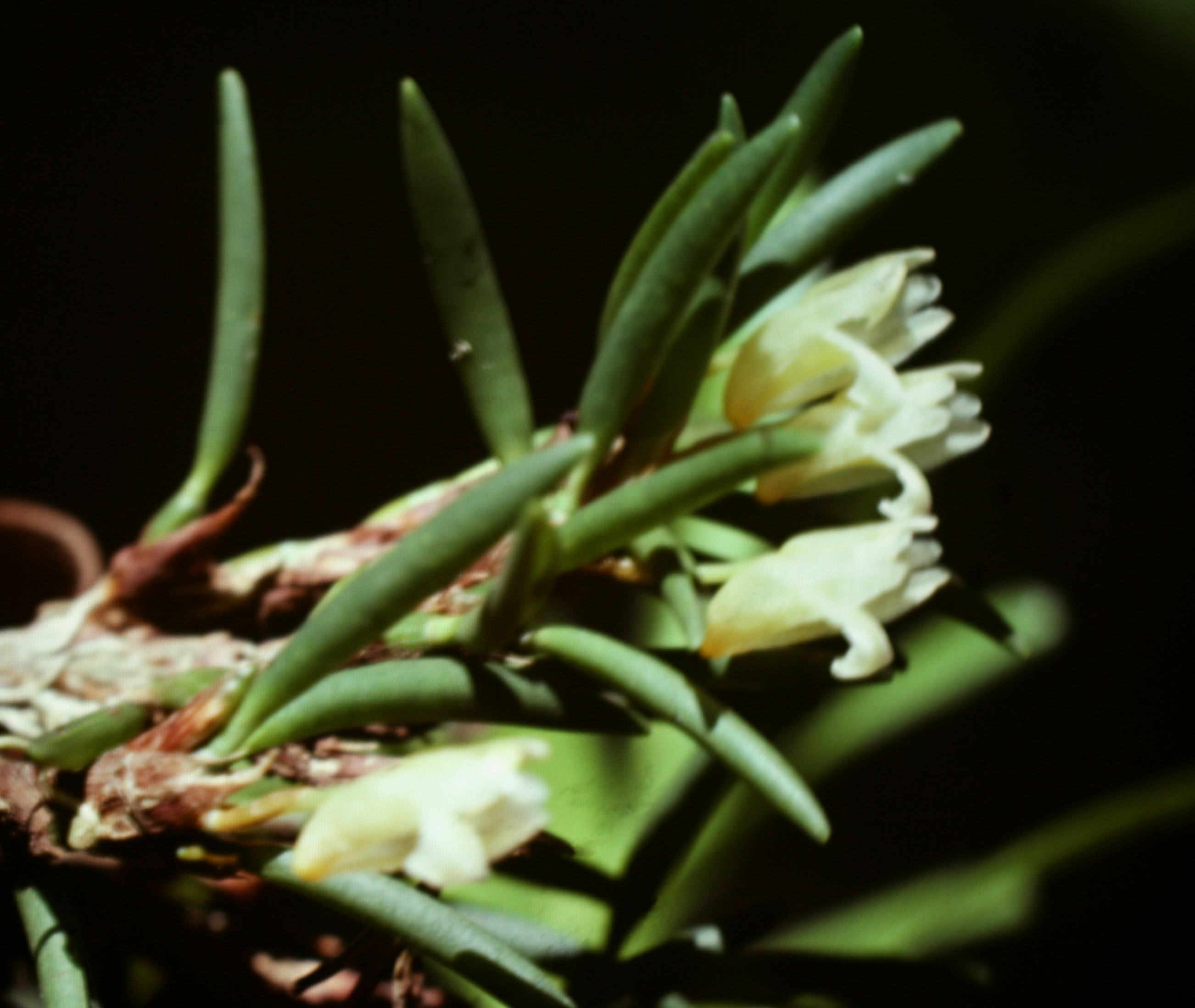

Scientific classification
- Kingdom: Plantae
- Clade: Tracheophytes
- Clade: Angiosperms
- Clade: Monocots
- Order: Asparagales
- Family: Orchidaceae
- Subfamily: Epidendroideae
- Genus: Maxillaria
- Species: M. uncata

Binomial name
- Maxillaria uncata Lindl.

Synonyms
- Maxillaria nana Hook.; Maxillaria squamata Barb.Rodr.; Ornithidium squamatum (Barb.Rodr.) Barb.Rodr.; Ornithidium nanum (Hook.) Rolfe; Camaridium squamatum (Barb.Rodr.) Hoehne; Camaridium uncatum (Lindl.) Hoehne

= Maxillaria uncata =

Species of orchid

Maxillaria uncata, the hook-shaped maxillaria, is a species of orchid ranging from southern Mexico to southern Brazil.
