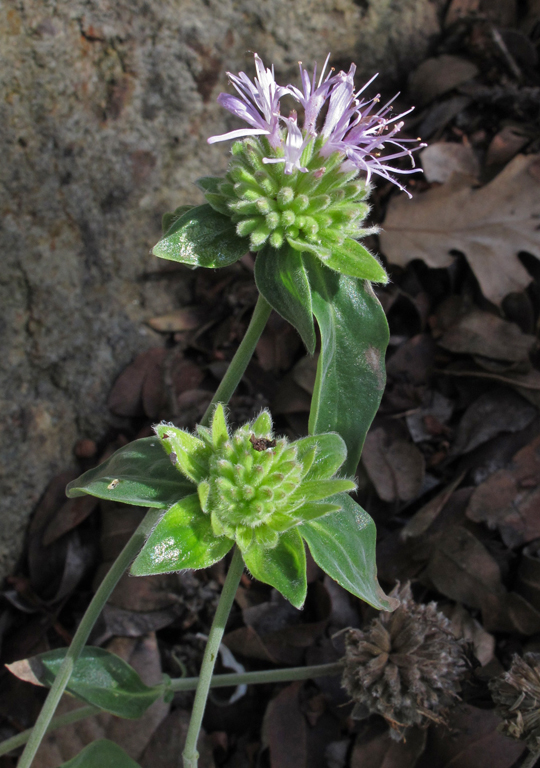

Scientific classification
- Kingdom: Plantae
- Clade: Tracheophytes
- Clade: Angiosperms
- Clade: Eudicots
- Clade: Asterids
- Order: Lamiales
- Family: Lamiaceae
- Genus: Monardella
- Species: M. viridis

Binomial name
- Monardella viridis Jeps.

= Monardella viridis =

Species of flowering plant

Monardella viridis is an uncommon species of flowering plant in the mint family which is endemic to California.

== Distribution ==
The plant has a disjunct distribution, its two subspecies separated by several hundred miles. The green monardella, ssp. viridis, is limited to the North Coast Ranges north of the San Francisco Bay Area, while the rock monardella, ssp. saxicola, is endemic to the San Gabriel Mountains of the Los Angeles Area.

== Description ==
In general, Monardella viridis is a perennial herb producing a hairy erect or decumbent stem lined with pairs of oval leaves with woolly undersides. The inflorescence is a head of several flowers blooming in a small cup of rough-haired, leaflike bracts. The light pink or purple flowers are between 1 and 2 centimeters long.
