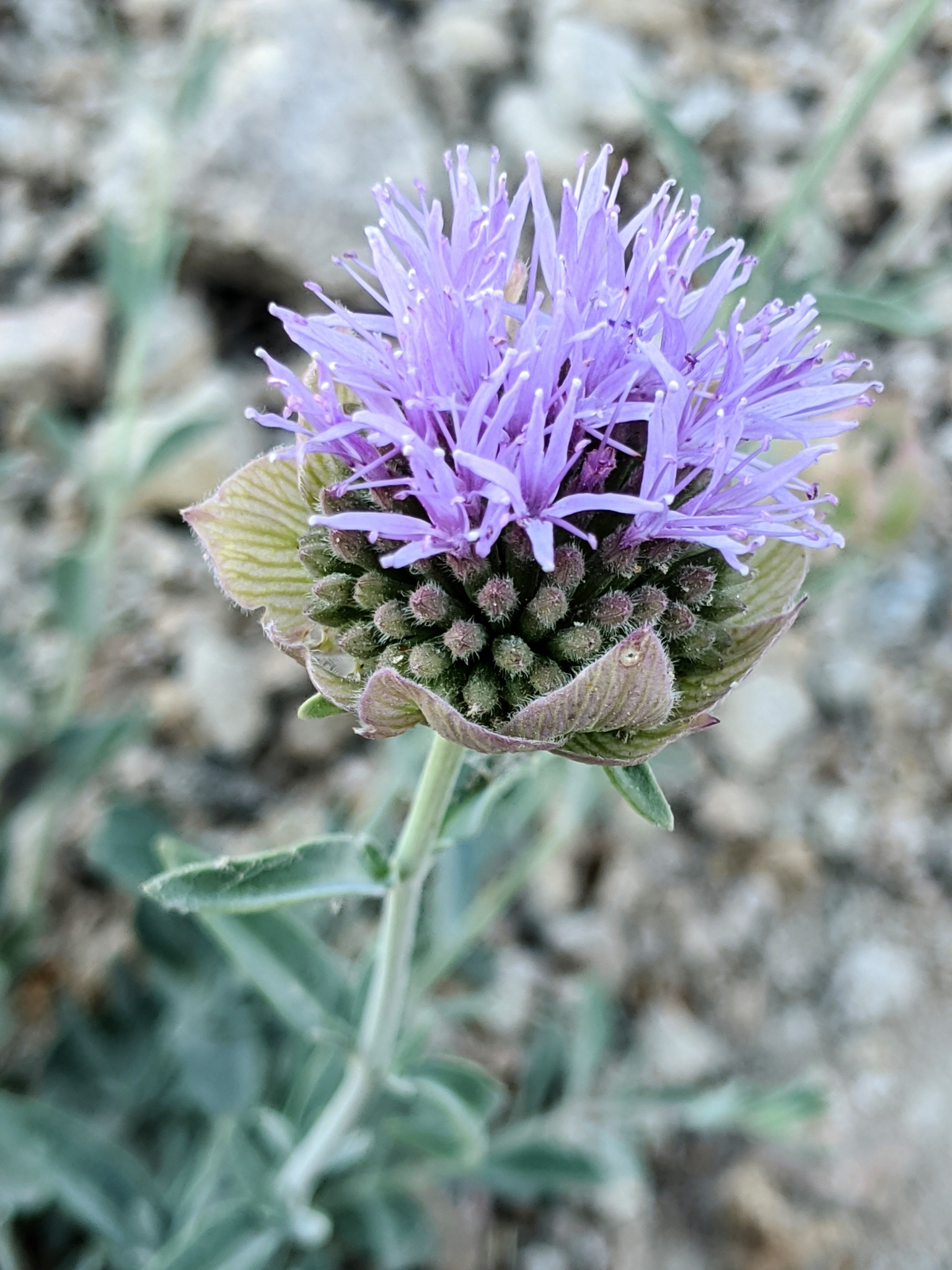
- Monardella linoides subsp. sierrae

Conservation status
- Secure (NatureServe)

Scientific classification
- Kingdom: Plantae
- Clade: Tracheophytes
- Clade: Angiosperms
- Clade: Eudicots
- Clade: Asterids
- Order: Lamiales
- Family: Lamiaceae
- Genus: Monardella
- Species: M. linoides

Binomial name
- Monardella linoides A.Gray

= Monardella linoides =

Species of flowering plant

Monardella linoides is a species of flowering plant in the family Lamiaceae known by the common name flaxleaf monardella.

It is native to southern California and slightly into adjacent sections of Nevada, Arizona, and Baja California.

It grows in many types of habitat from the Mojave Desert, through chaparral and woodlands in the Peninsular Ranges and Transverse Ranges, to subalpine forests in the Southern and Eastern Sierra Nevada.

== Description ==
Monardella linoides is a gray-green perennial herb producing a slender erect stem up to about 50 centimeters in maximum height. The linear to oval leaves are 1 to 4 centimeters long and coated in grayish hairs. The inflorescence is a head of several flowers blooming in a cup of pale whitish or pink-tinged papery bracts 2 or 3 centimeters wide. The flowers are just over a centimeter long and light purple in color.

=== Subspecies ===
Subspecies include:

- Monardella linoides subsp. anemonoides — endemic to the Southern Sierra Nevada.
- Monardella linoides subsp. erecta — endemic to the San Gabriel Mountains and San Bernardino Mountains.
- Monardella linoides subsp. linoides
- Monardella linoides subsp. oblonga — endemic to the San Emigdio Mountains and Southern Sierra.
- Monardella linoides subsp. sierrae — Narrow leaved monardella, endemic to the Sierra Nevada.
- Monardella linoides subsp. stricta — endemic to the San Gabriel Mountains and San Bernardino Mountains.
- Monardella linoides subsp. viminea — reclassified as Monardella viminea, a federally listed endangered species.
