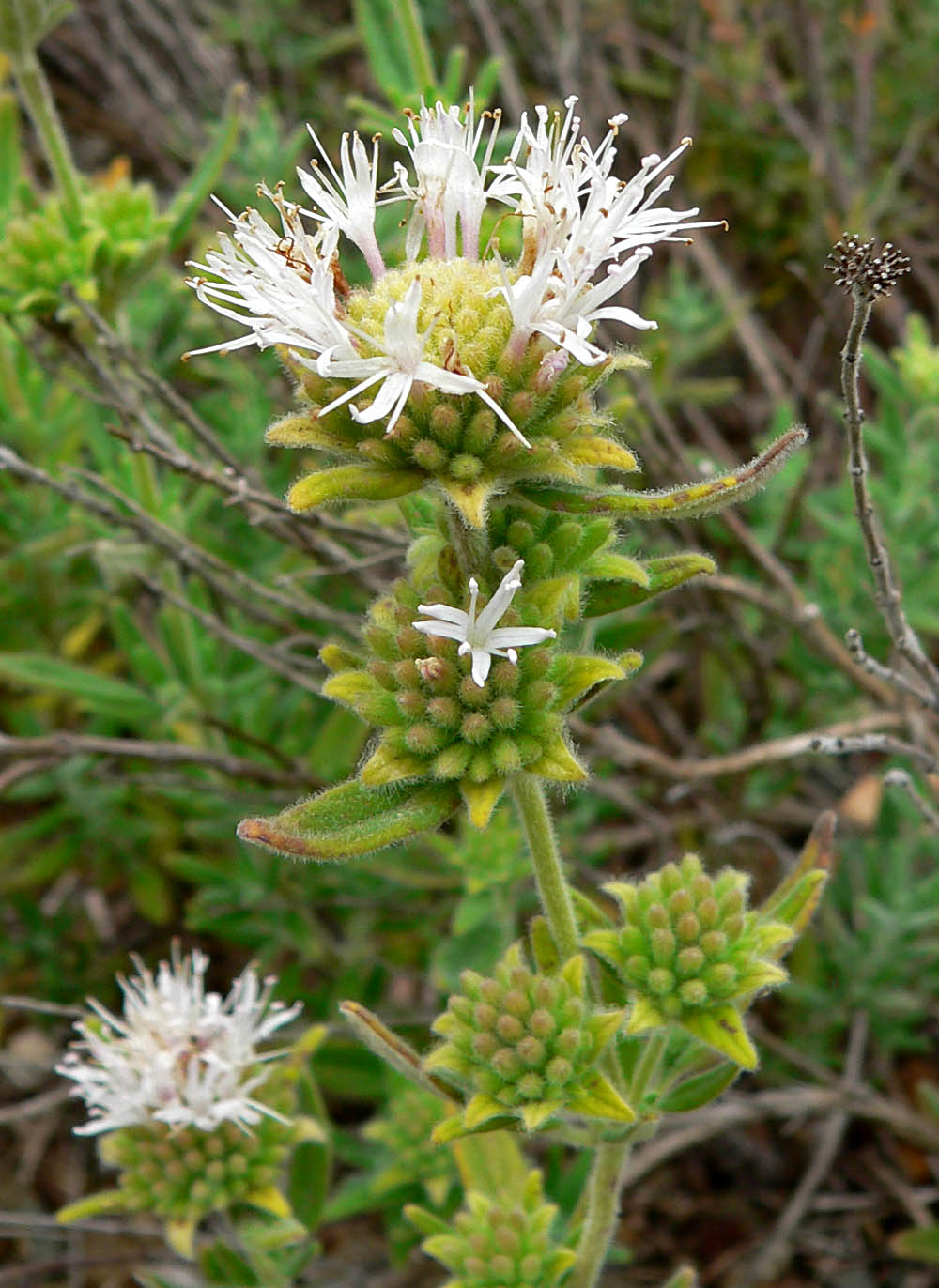
- Monardella hypoleuca ssp. lanata

Scientific classification
- Kingdom: Plantae
- Clade: Tracheophytes
- Clade: Angiosperms
- Clade: Eudicots
- Clade: Asterids
- Order: Lamiales
- Family: Lamiaceae
- Tribe: Mentheae
- Genus: Monardella; L.

Species
- See text.

Synonyms
- Madronella Greene (Note: Madronella is a taxonomic anagram of Monardella.)

= Monardella =

Genus of flowering plants in the sage family

Monardella is a genus of approximately 40 species of annual and perennial plants native to western North America from British Columbia to northwestern Mexico. They are grown for their highly aromatic foliage, which in some species is used for herbal teas. The two-lipped, tubular flowers are formed in terminal clusters and are most usually red, pink, or purple.

Monardella is a Latin diminutive form of Monarda (a taxonomic patronym honoring the Spanish botanist Nicolás Monardes), which the form of the flower heads resembles. Plants in this genus are commonly known as wildmints, coyote mints or monardellas.

== Species ==
As of February 2024, Plants of the World Online accepted the following species:

- Monardella angustifolia Elvin, Ertter & Mansfield
- Monardella arizonica Epling – Arizona
- Monardella australis Abrams – southern California
- Monardella beneolens Shevock, Ertter & Jokerst – southern California
- Monardella boydii A.C.Sanders & Elvin – southern California
- Monardella breweri A.Gray – California, Nevada, Arizona, Baja California
  - Monardella breweri subsp. lanceolata (A.Gray) A.C.Sanders & Elvin, syn. Monardella lanceolata A.Gray – California
- Monardella candicans Benth. – San Joaquín Valley of California
- Monardella douglasii Benth. – San Francisco Bay area of California
- Monardella eplingii Elvin et al. – Arizona
- Monardella eremicola A.C.Sanders & Elvin – southern California
- Monardella exilis (A.Gray) Greene – southern California, Arizona
- Monardella follettii (Jeps.) Jokerst – northern Sierra Nevada in California
- Monardella hypoleuca A.Gray – southern California, Baja California
- Monardella kruckebergii Elvin, R.B.Kelley & B.T.Drew
- Monardella lagunensis M.E.Jones – Baja California Sur
- †Monardella leucocephala A.Gray – Merced & Stanislaus counties in California but believed to be extinct
- Monardella linoides A.Gray – California, Arizona, Nevada, Baja California
- Monardella macrantha A.Gray – California, Baja California
- Monardella mojavensis Elvin & A.C.Sanders – Mohave Desert of southeastern California & southern Nevada
- Monardella nana A.Gray – California, Baja California
- Monardella odoratissima Benth. – mountain wildmint, mountain coyote mint or mountain pennyroyal – much of western North America from British Columbia south to southern California & New Mexico
  - Monardella odoratissima subsp. villosa (Benth.) Brunell, syns Monardella antonina Hardham, Monardella villosa Benth. – (common) coyote mint – California
- Monardella palmeri A.Gray – Santa Lucia Mountains of west-central California
- Monardella perplexans Elvin, R.B.Kelley & B.T.Drew
- †Monardella pringlei A.Gray – Mohave Desert of southeastern California but believed to be extinct
- Monardella purpurea Howell – Oregon, California
- Monardella robisonii Epling ex Munz – Mohave Desert of southeastern California
- Monardella saxicola I.M.Johnst. – southeastern California
- Monardella sheltonii Torr. ex Durand – Oregon, California
- Monardella sinuata Elvin & A.C.Sanders – coastal central California
- Monardella siskiyouensis Hardham – northern California
- Monardella stebbinsii Hardham & Bartel – Plumas County in northern California
- Monardella stoneana Elvin & A.C.Sanders – San Diego County in California, Baja California
- Monardella × subglabra (Hoover) Hardham – California (M. purpurea × M. villosa)
- Monardella subserrata Greene
- Monardella thymifolia Greene – Cedros Island in Baja California
- Monardella undulata Benth. – coastal central California
- Monardella venosa (Torr.) A.C.Sanders & Elvin – central California
- Monardella viminea Greene – San Diego County in southern California
- Monardella viridis Jeps. – northern San Francisco Bay area of California (Sonoma, Napa, Solano, & Lake Counties)
- Monardella walwaamaxsia Elvin, R.B.Kelley & B.T.Drew

== Horticulture and ecology ==
Most like a sunny, sharply drained site and can be attractive in a rock garden or pot in the alpine house if smaller species are selected. The taller ones can be used at the front of a dry sunny border. They have reasonable frost resistance, but resent dampness in winter. Propagate from seed or summer cuttings of perennial species, or by division of clumps.

Monardella is a nectar plant for many Lepidoptera (butterflies and moths), including the endangered Myrtle's silverspot (Speyeria zerene myrtleae).

Several species are rare California endemics; two, the Merced monardella (M. leucocephala) and Pringle's monardella (M. pringlei), have not been seen in many decades and are presumed extinct.
