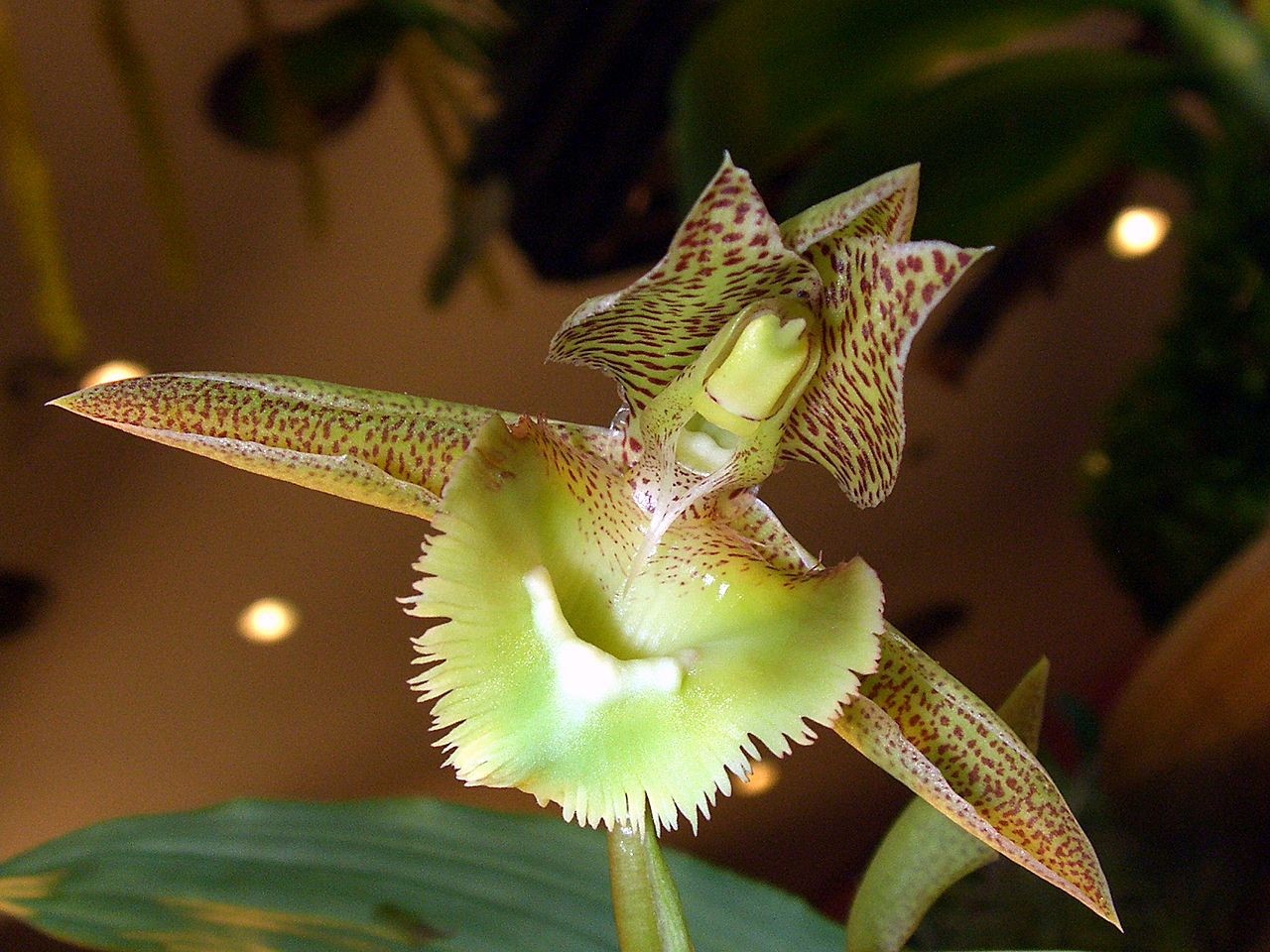

Scientific classification
- Kingdom: Plantae
- Clade: Tracheophytes
- Clade: Angiosperms
- Clade: Monocots
- Order: Asparagales
- Family: Orchidaceae
- Subfamily: Epidendroideae
- Genus: Catasetum
- Species: C. fimbriatum

Binomial name
- Catasetum fimbriatum (C. Morren) Lindl. (1850)

Synonyms
- List: Myanthus fimbriatus C. Morren (1848) (Basionym); Catasetum fimbriatum var. fissum Rchb.f. (1881); Catasetum fimbriatum var. viridulum Rchb.f. (1887); Catasetum fimbriatum var. platypterum Rchb.f. (1889); Catasetum cogniauxii L. Linden (1900); Catasetum ornithorrhynchum Porsch (1905); Catasetum fimbriatum var. aurantiacum Porsch (1908); Catasetum fimbriatum var. brevipetalum Porsch (1908); Catasetum fimbriatum var. micranthum Porsch (1908); Catasetum pflanzii Schltr. (1912); Catasetum inconstans Hoehne (1915); Catasetum wredeanum Schltr. (1915); Catasetum fimbriatum var. subtropicale Hauman (1917); Catasetum fimbriatum var. inconstans (Hoehne) Mansf. (1932); Catasetum fimbriatum var. morrenianum Mansf. (1932); Catasetum fimbriatum var. ornithorrhynchum (Porsch) Mansf. (1932)

= Catasetum fimbriatum =

Species of orchid

Catasetum fimbriatum, the fringed catasetum, is a member of the orchid family of flowering plants and lives in a warm tropical environment. This plant uses a fascinating strategy to spread its pollen to other flowers via insects, primarily bees. When a pollinator lands on male flowers of C. fimbriatum and stimulates them, pollen is planted onto the back of the pollinator. This assures their gametes will be spread to other flowers the bee visits of the same species.

The mechanism behind how male C. fimbriatum ejects its pollen onto bees is still not well understood. However, kinetic studies have been done. When a bee lands on the flower this stimulates the antennae triggering a quick change in membrane potential. This propagates an action potential that results in an increase in turgor pressure. Immediately following an ejection of pollen onto the back of the bee and according to Simon et al., can sometimes knock the bee off the flower. Indeed, this was probably an evolved adaptation to prevent cross pollination

Darwin's bee-trap experiment analyzed the kinetics and activation of this trigger mechanism of slapping pollen onto the back of bees. Frame by frame analysis was conducted with a V5.0 digital camera that captures images at 1,000 pictures per second. The antennae of the orchid that set off the catapult of pollen was activated using a small wire. Many other experiments have shown evidence of electrical changes in membrane potential in plants such as the carnivorous Venus flytrap using ion-selective micro-electrodes and the Mimosa plant using ion analysis in addition to X-ray fluorescence spectroscopy. Future experiments utilizing these techniques could elucidate a more vivid picture of how this mechanism works on the molecular level.
