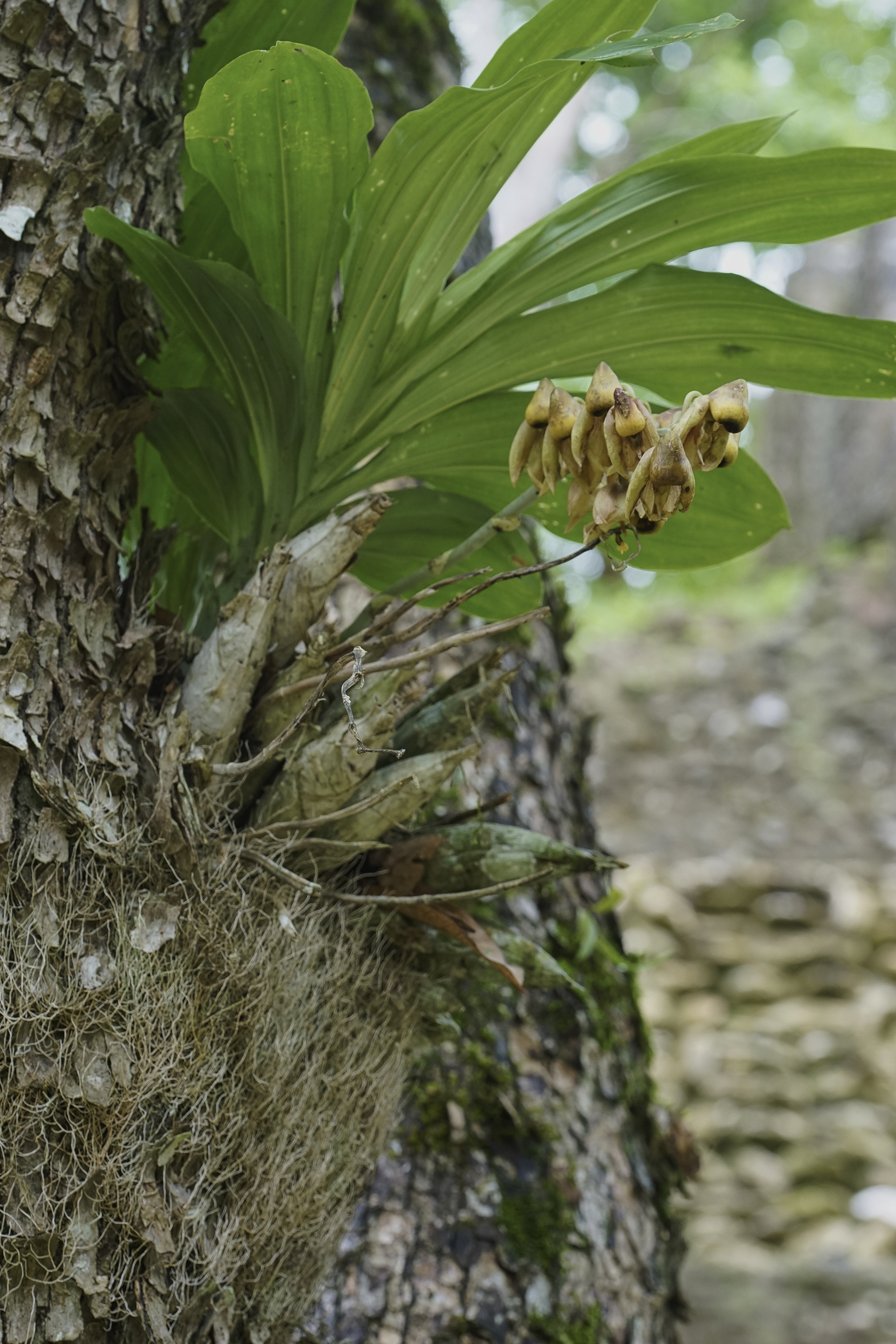
- Catasetum integerrimum, Belize

Scientific classification
- Kingdom: Plantae
- Clade: Tracheophytes
- Clade: Angiosperms
- Clade: Monocots
- Order: Asparagales
- Family: Orchidaceae
- Subfamily: Epidendroideae
- Genus: Catasetum
- Species: C. integerrimum

Binomial name
- Catasetum integerrimum Hook. (1840)

Synonyms
- Catasetum integerrimum var. purpurascens Hook. (1840); Catasetum integerrimum var. viridiflorum Hook. (1840); Catasetum wailesii Hook. (1842)

= Catasetum integerrimum =

Species of neotropical orchid

Catasetum integerrimum, the intact catasetum, is a species of orchid found from Mexico to Central America.
