= List of Erica species =

Erica (heaths or heathers) is a large genus of flowering trees, shrubs, and subshrubs most diverse in southern Africa but found throughout the continent and in Europe. They have been introduced to Australia and North America. Erica is the type genus of the heath family, Ericaceae. As of January 2019, there are over 850 accepted species in Kew's Plants of the World Online.

== A ==
- Erica abbottii (E.G.H.Oliv.)
- Erica abelii (E.G.H.Oliv.)
- Erica abietina (L.)
- Erica accommodata (Klotzsch ex Benth.)
- Erica acuta (Andrews)
- Erica adaequata (Tausch)
- Erica adnata (L.Bolus)
- Erica adunca (Benth.)
- Erica aemula (Guthrie & Bolus)
- Erica aestiva (Markötter)
- Erica affinis (Benth.)
- Erica afra (L.)
- Erica afrorum (Bolus)
- Erica agglutinans (E.G.H.Oliv.)
- Erica aggregata (J.C.Wendl.)
- Erica aghillana (Guthrie & Bolus)
- Erica albens (L.)
- Erica albertyniae (E.G.H.Oliv.)
- Erica albescens (Klotzsch ex Benth.)
- Erica albospicata (Hilliard & B.L.Burtt)
- Erica alexandri (Guthrie & Bolus)
- Erica alfredii (Guthrie & Bolus)
- Erica algida (Bolus)
- Erica alnea (E.G.H.Oliv.)
- Erica alopecurus (Harv.)
- Erica altevirens (H.A.Baker)
- Erica alticola (Guthrie & Bolus)
- Erica altiphila (E.G.H.Oliv.)
- Erica amalophylla (E.G.H.Oliv. & I.M.Oliv.)
- Erica amatolensis (E.G.H.Oliv.)
- Erica amicorum (E.G.H.Oliv.)
- Erica amidae (E.G.H.Oliv.)
- Erica amoena (J.C.Wendl.)
- Erica amphigena (Guthrie & Bolus)
- Erica ampullacea (Curtis)
- Erica andevalensis (Cabezudo & J.Rivera)
- Erica andreaei (Compton)
- Erica andringitrensis ((H.Perrier) Dorr & E.G.H.Oliv.)
- Erica aneimena (Dulfer)
- Erica anemodes (E.G.H.Oliv.)
- Erica anguliger ((N.E.Br.) E.G.H.Oliv.)
- Erica angulosa (E.G.H.Oliv.)
- Erica annalis (E.G.H.Oliv. & I.M.Oliv.)
- Erica annectens (Guthrie & Bolus)
- Erica anomala (Hilliard & B.L.Burtt)
- Erica arachnocalyx (E.G.H.Oliv.)
- Erica arborea (L.)
- Erica arborescens ((Willd.) E.G.H.Oliv.)
- Erica arcuata (Compton)
- Erica ardens (Andrews)
- Erica arenaria (L.Bolus)
- Erica areolata ((N.E.Br.) E.G.H.Oliv.)
- Erica argentea (Klotzsch ex Benth.)
- Erica argyraea (Guthrie & Bolus)
- Erica aristata (Andrews)
- Erica armandiana (Dorr & E.G.H.Oliv.)
- Erica armata (Klotzsch ex Benth.)
- Erica artemisioides ((Klotzsch) E.G.H.Oliv.)
- Erica articularis (L.)
- Erica aspalathifolia (Bolus)
- Erica aspalathoides (Guthrie & Bolus ex Schltr.)
- Erica astroites (Guthrie & Bolus)
- Erica atherstonei (Diels ex L.Guthrie & Bolus)
- Erica atricha (Dulfer)
- Erica atromontana (E.G.H.Oliv.)
- Erica atropurpurea (Dulfer)
- Erica atrovinosa (E.G.H.Oliv.)
- Erica auriculata (Guthrie & Bolus)
- Erica australis (L.)
- Erica austronyassana (Alm & T.C.E.Fr.)
- Erica austroverna (Hilliard)
- Erica autumnalis (L.Bolus)
- Erica axillaris (Thunb.)
- Erica axilliflora (Bartl.)
- Erica azaleifolia (Salisb.)
- Erica azorica (Hochst. ex Seub.)

== B ==
- Erica baccans (L.)
- Erica bakeri (T.M.Salter)
- Erica banksia (Andrews)
- Erica barbigeroides (E.G.H.Oliv.)
- Erica barnettiana (Dorr & E.G.H.Oliv.)
- Erica baroniana (Dorr & E.G.H.Oliv.)
- Erica barrydalensis (L.Bolus)
- Erica bauera (Andrews)
- Erica baurii (Bolus)
- Erica beatricis (Compton)
- Erica benguelensis ((Welw. ex Engl.) E.G.H.Oliv.)
- Erica bergiana (L.)
- Erica berzelioides (Guthrie & Bolus)
- Erica betsileana ((H.Perrier) Dorr & E.G.H.Oliv.)
- Erica bibax (Salisb.)
- Erica bicolor (Thunb.)
- Erica binaria (E.G.H.Oliv.)
- Erica blaerioides (E.G.H.Oliv.)
- Erica blancheana (L.Bolus)
- Erica blandfordia (Andrews)
- Erica blenna (Salisb.)
- Erica blesbergensis (H.A.Baker)
- Erica bodkinii (Guthrie & Bolus)
- Erica bojeri (Dorr & E.G.H.Oliv.)
- Erica bokkeveldia (E.G.H.Oliv.)
- Erica bolusanthus (E.G.H.Oliv.)
- Erica bolusiae (T.M.Salter)
- Erica borboniifolia (Salisb.)
- Erica bosseri (Dorr)
- Erica botryoides (Dulfer)
- Erica boucheri (E.G.H.Oliv.)
- Erica boutonii (Dorr & E.G.H.Oliv.)
- Erica brachialis (Salisb.)
- Erica brachycentra (Benth.)
- Erica brachyphylla ((Benth.) E.G.H.Oliv.)
- Erica brachysepala (Guthrie & Bolus)
- Erica bracteolaris (Lam.)
- Erica bredasiana (E.G.H.Oliv.)
- Erica brevicaulis (Guthrie & Bolus)
- Erica brevifolia (Sol. ex Salisb.)
- Erica broadleyana (Andrews)
- Erica brownii (E.G.H.Oliv.)
- Erica brownleeae (Bolus)
- Erica bruniades (L.)
- Erica bruniifolia (Salisb.)
- Erica burchelliana (E.G.H.Oliv.)

== C ==
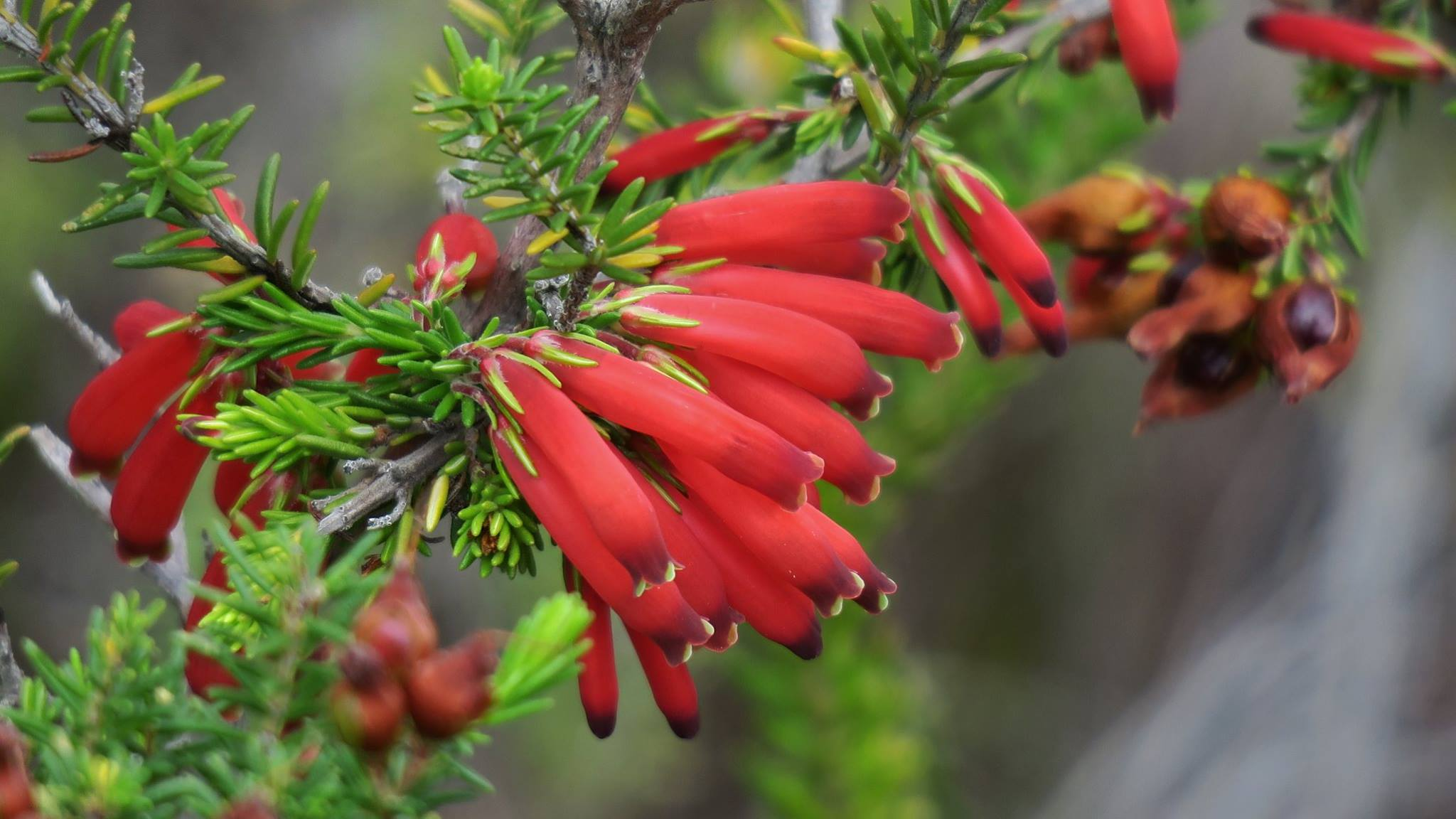
Erica chloroloma

- Erica cabernetea (E.G.H.Oliv.)
- Erica caespitosa (Hilliard & B.L.Burtt)
- Erica calcareophila (E.G.H.Oliv.)
- Erica calcicola ((E.G.H.Oliv.) E.G.H.Oliv.)
- Erica caledonica (A.Spreng.)
- Erica calycina (L.)
- Erica cameronii (L.Bolus)
- Erica campanularis (Salisb.)
- Erica canaliculata (Andrews)
- Erica canariensis (Rivas-Mart., MM. Osorio & Wildpret)
- Erica canescens (J.C.Wendl.)
- Erica capensis (T.M.Salter)
- Erica capillaris (Bartl.)
- Erica capitata (L.)
- Erica caprina (E.G.H.Oliv.)
- Erica carduifolia (Salisb.)
- Erica carnea (L.)
- Erica caterviflora (Salisb.)
- Erica cavartica (E.G.H.Oliv. & I.M.Oliv.)
- Erica cederbergensis (Compton)
- Erica cedromontana (E.G.H.Oliv.)
- Erica ceraria (E.G.H.Oliv. & I.M.Oliv.)
- Erica cereris ((Compton) E.G.H.Oliv.)
- Erica cerinthoides (L.)
- Erica cernua (Montin)
- Erica cerviciflora (Salisb.)
- Erica cetrata (E.G.H.Oliv.)
- Erica chamissonis (Klotzsch ex Benth.)
- Erica chartacea (Guthrie & Bolus)
- Erica chionodes (E.G.H.Oliv.)
- Erica chionophila (Guthrie & Bolus)
- Erica chiroptera (E.G.H.Oliv.)
- Erica chlamydiflora (Salisb.)
- Erica chloroloma (Lindl.)
- Erica chlorosepala (Benth.)
- Erica chonantha (Dulfer)
- Erica chrysocodon (Guthrie & Bolus)
- Erica ciliaris (L.)
- Erica cincta (L.Bolus)
- Erica cinerea (L.)
- Erica clavisepala (Guthrie & Bolus)
- Erica coacervata (H.A.Baker)
- Erica coarctata (J.C.Wendl.)
- Erica coccinea (L.)
- Erica collina (Guthrie & Bolus)
- Erica colorans (Andrews)
- Erica columnaris (E.G.H.Oliv.)
- Erica comata (Guthrie & Bolus)
- Erica comorensis ((Engl.) Dorr & E.G.H.Oliv.)
- Erica condensata (Benth.)
- Erica conferta (Andrews)
- Erica consobrina (Guthrie & Bolus)
- Erica conspicua (Aiton)
- Erica constantia (Nois. ex Benth.)
- Erica cooperi (Bolus)
- Erica copiosa (J.C.Wendl.)
- Erica cordata (Andrews)
- Erica corifolia (L.)
- Erica coronanthera (Compton)
- Erica corydalis (Salisb.)
- Erica costatisepala (H.A.Baker)
- Erica crassifolia (Andrews)
- Erica crassisepala (Benth.)
- Erica crateriformis (Guthrie & Bolus)
- Erica cremea (Dulfer)
- Erica cristata (Dulfer)
- Erica cristiflora (Salisb.)
- Erica croceovirens (E.G.H.Oliv. & I.M.Oliv.)
- Erica crucistigmatica (Dulfer)
- Erica cruenta (Aiton)
- Erica cryptanthera (Guthrie & Bolus)
- Erica cryptoclada ((Baker) Dorr & E.G.H.Oliv.)
- Erica cubica (L.)
- Erica cubitans (E.G.H.Oliv.)
- Erica cumuliflora (Salisb.)
- Erica cunoniensis (E.G.H.Oliv.)
- Erica curtophylla (Guthrie & Bolus)
- Erica curviflora (L.)
- Erica curvifolia (Salisb.)
- Erica curvirostris (Salisb.)
- Erica curvistyla ((N.E.Br.) E.G.H.Oliv.)
- Erica cuscutiformis (Dulfer)
- Erica cyathiformis (Salisb.)
- Erica cygnea (T.M.Salter)
- Erica cylindrica (Thunb.)
- Erica cymosa (E.Mey. ex Benth.)
- Erica cyrilliflora (Salisb.)

== D ==
- Erica danguyana ((H.Perrier) Dorr & E.G.H.Oliv.)
- Erica daphniflora (Salisb.)
- Erica debilis (Guthrie & Bolus)
- Erica deflexa (Sinclair)
- Erica deliciosa (H.L.Wendl. ex Benth.)
- Erica demissa (Klotzsch ex Benth.)
- Erica densata (Dorr & E.G.H.Oliv.)
- Erica densifolia (Willd.)
- Erica denticulata (L.)
- Erica depressa (L.)
- Erica desmantha (Benth.)
- Erica dianthifolia (Salisb.)
- Erica diaphana (Spreng.)
- Erica dilatata (H.L.Wendl. ex Benth.)
- Erica diosmifolia (Salisb.)
- Erica diotiflora (Salisb.)
- Erica discolor (Andrews)
- Erica dispar ((N.E.Br.) E.G.H.Oliv.)
- Erica dissimulans (Hilliard & B.L.Burtt)
- Erica distorta (Bartl.)
- Erica dodii (Guthrie & Bolus)
- Erica dolfiana (E.G.H.Oliv.)
- Erica doliiformis (Salisb.)
- Erica dominans (Killick)
- Erica dracomontana (E.G.H.Oliv.)
- Erica drakensbergensis (Guthrie & Bolus)
- Erica dregei (E.G.H.Oliv.)
- Erica dulcis (L.Bolus)
- Erica dysantha (Benth.)

== E ==
- Erica ebracteata (Bolus)
- Erica eburnea (T.M.Salter)
- Erica ecklonii (E.G.H.Oliv.)
- Erica eglandulosa ((Klotzsch) E.G.H.Oliv.)
- Erica elimensis (L.Bolus)
- Erica ellipticiflora (Dulfer)
- Erica elsieana ((E.G.H.Oliv.) E.G.H.Oliv.)
- Erica embothriifolia (Salisb.)
- Erica empetrina (L.)
- Erica equisetifolia (Salisb.)
- Erica erasmia (Dulfer)
- Erica eremioides ((MacOwan) E.G.H.Oliv.)
- Erica ericoides ((L.) E.G.H.Oliv.)
- Erica erigena (R.Ross)
- Erica erinus ((Klotzsch ex Benth.) E.G.H.Oliv.)
- Erica eriocephala (Lam.)
- Erica eriocodon (Bolus)
- Erica eriophoros (Guthrie & Bolus)
- Erica esterhuyseniae (Compton)
- Erica esteriana (E.G.H.Oliv.)
- Erica ethelae (L.Bolus)
- Erica eugenea (Dulfer)
- Erica euryphylla (R.C.Turner)
- Erica eustacei (L.Bolus)
- Erica evansii ((N.E.Br.) E.G.H.Oliv.)
- Erica excavata (L.Bolus)
- Erica exleeana (E.G.H.Oliv.)
- Erica extrusa (Compton)

== F ==
- Erica fairii (Bolus)
- Erica fascicularis (L.f.)
- Erica fastigiata (L.)
- Erica fausta (Salisb.)
- Erica feminarum (E.G.H.Oliv.)
- Erica ferrea (P.J.Bergius)
- Erica filago ((Alm & T.C.E.Fr.) Beentje)
- Erica filamentosa (Andrews)
- Erica filialis (E.G.H.Oliv.)
- Erica filiformis (Salisb.)
- Erica filipendula (Benth.)
- Erica fimbriata (Andrews)
- Erica flacca (E.Mey. ex Benth.)
- Erica flanaganii (Bolus)
- Erica flavicoma (Bartl.)
- Erica flexicaulis (Dryand.)
- Erica flexistyla (E.G.H.Oliv.)
- Erica floccifera (Zahlbr.)
- Erica flocciflora (Benth.)
- Erica florifera ((Compton) E.G.H.Oliv.)
- Erica foliacea (Andrews)
- Erica fontana (L.Bolus)
- Erica formosa (Thunb.)
- Erica forsteri (Dulfer)
- Erica frigida (Bolus)
- Erica fuscescens ((Klotzsch) E.G.H.Oliv.)

== G ==
- Erica galgebergensis (H.A.Baker)
- Erica galioides (Lam.)
- Erica galpinii (T.M.Salter)
- Erica garciae (E.G.H.Oliv.)
- Erica genistifolia (Salisb.)
- Erica georgica (Guthrie & Bolus)
- Erica gerhardii (E.G.H.Oliv. & I.M.Oliv.)
- Erica gibbosa (Klotzsch ex Benth.)
- Erica gigantea (Klotzsch ex Benth.)
- Erica gillii (Benth.)
- Erica glabella (Thunb.)
- Erica glabripes (L.Bolus)
- Erica glandulifera (Klotzsch)
- Erica glandulipila (Compton)
- Erica glandulosa (Thunb.)
- Erica glaphyra (Killick)
- Erica glauca (Andrews)
- Erica globiceps ((N.E.Br.) E.G.H.Oliv.)
- Erica globulifera (Dulfer)
- Erica glomiflora (Salisb.)
- Erica glumiflora (Klotzsch ex Benth.)
- Erica glutinosa (P.J.Bergius)
- Erica gnaphaloides (L.)
- Erica goatcheriana (L.Bolus)
- Erica gossypioides (E.G.H.Oliv.)
- Erica goudotiana ((Klotzsch) Dorr & E.G.H.Oliv.)
- Erica gracilipes (Guthrie & Bolus)
- Erica gracilis (J.C.Wendl.)
- Erica grandiflora (L.f.)
- Erica granulatifolia (H.A.Baker)
- Erica granulosa (H.A.Baker)
- Erica grata (Guthrie & Bolus)
- Erica greyii (Guthrie & Bolus)
- Erica grisbrookii (Guthrie & Bolus)
- Erica guthriei (Bolus)
- Erica gysbertii (Guthrie & Bolus)

== H ==
- Erica haemastoma (J.C.Wendl.)
- Erica haematocodon (T.M.Salter)
- Erica haematosiphon (Guthrie & Bolus)
- Erica halicacaba (L.)
- Erica hameriana (L.Bolus)
- Erica hanekomii (E.G.H.Oliv.)
- Erica hansfordii (E.G.H.Oliv.)
- Erica harveiana (Guthrie & Bolus)
- Erica hebdomadalis (E.G.H.Oliv. & I.M.Oliv.)
- Erica hebecalyx (Benth.)
- Erica hebeclada (Dorr & E.G.H.Oliv.)
- Erica heleogena (T.M.Salter)
- Erica heliophila (Guthrie & Bolus)
- Erica hendricksei (H.A.Baker)
- Erica hermani (E.G.H.Oliv.)
- Erica heterophylla (Guthrie & Bolus)
- Erica hexandra ((S.Moore) E.G.H.Oliv.)
- Erica hexensis (E.G.H.Oliv.)
- Erica hibbertia (Andrews)
- Erica hillburttii ((E.G.H.Oliv.) E.G.H.Oliv.)
- Erica hippurus (Compton)
- Erica hirta (Thunb.)
- Erica hirtiflora (Curtis)
- Erica hispidula (L.)
- Erica hispiduloides (E.G.H.Oliv.)
- Erica holosericea (Salisb.)
- Erica holtii (Schweick.)
- Erica hottentotica (E.G.H.Oliv.)
- Erica humansdorpensis (Compton)
- Erica humbertii ((H.Perrier) Dorr & E.G.H.Oliv.)
- Erica humidicola (E.G.H.Oliv.)
- Erica humifusa (Hibberd ex Salisb.)

== I ==
- Erica ibityensis ((H.Perrier) Dorr & E.G.H.Oliv.)
- Erica ignita (E.G.H.Oliv.)
- Erica imbricata (L.)
- Erica imerinensis ((H.Perrier) Dorr & E.G.H.Oliv.)
- Erica inaequalis ((Klotzsch) E.G.H.Oliv.)
- Erica inamoena ()
- Erica incarnata (Thunb.)
- Erica inclusa (H.L.Wendl. ex Benth.)
- Erica inconstans (Zahlbr.)
- Erica inflata (Thunb.)
- Erica inflaticalyx (E.G.H.Oliv.)
- Erica infundibuliformis (Andrews)
- Erica ingeana (E.G.H.Oliv.)
- Erica innovans (E.G.H.Oliv.)
- Erica inops (Bolus)
- Erica inordinata (H.A.Baker)
- Erica insignis (E.G.H.Oliv.)
- Erica insolitanthera (H.A.Baker)
- Erica intermedia (Klotzsch ex Benth.)
- Erica interrupta ((N.E.Br.) E.G.H.Oliv.)
- Erica intervallaris (Salisb.)
- Erica intonsa (L.Bolus)
- Erica intricata (H.A.Baker)
- Erica involucrata (Klotzsch ex Benth.)
- Erica involvens (Benth.)
- Erica ioniana (E.G.H.Oliv.)
- Erica irbyana (Andrews)
- Erica irregularis (Benth.)
- Erica irrorata (Guthrie & Bolus)
- Erica isaloensis ((H.Perrier) Dorr & E.G.H.Oliv.)
- Erica ixanthera (Benth.)

== J ==
- Erica jacksoniana (H.A.Baker)
- Erica jananthus (E.G.H.Oliv. & I.M.Oliv.)
- Erica jasminiflora (Salisb.)
- Erica jeppei (L.Bolus)
- Erica johnstoniana (Britten)
- Erica jonasiana (E.G.H.Oliv.)
- Erica jugicola (E.G.H.Oliv. & I.M.Oliv.)
- Erica jumellei ((H.Perrier) Dorr & E.G.H.Oliv.)
- Erica juniperina (E.G.H.Oliv.)
- Erica junonia (Bolus)

== K ==
- Erica kammanassieae (E.G.H.Oliv.)
- Erica karooica (E.G.H.Oliv.)
- Erica karwyderi (E.G.H.Oliv.)
- Erica keeromsbergensis (H.A.Baker)
- Erica keetii (L.Bolus)
- Erica kingaensis (Engl.)
- Erica kirstenii (E.G.H.Oliv.)
- Erica klotzschii ((Alm & T.C.E.Fr.) E.G.H.Oliv.)
- Erica kogelbergensis (E.G.H.Oliv.)
- Erica kougabergensis (H.A.Baker)
- Erica kraussiana (Klotzsch ex Walp.)
- Erica krugeri (E.G.H.Oliv.)

== L ==
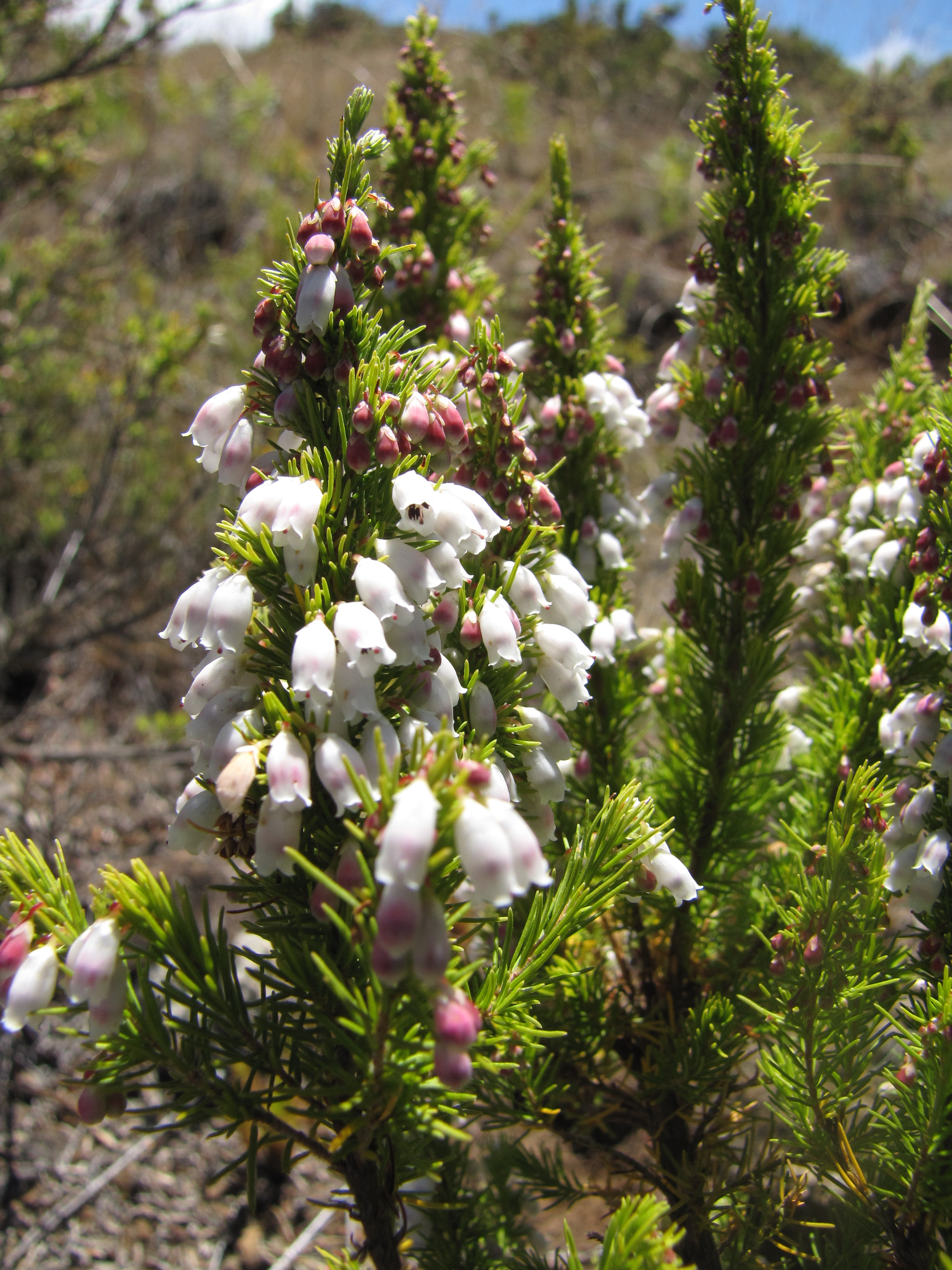
Erica lusitanica

- Erica labialis (Salisb.)
- Erica lachnaeoides (G.Don)
- Erica lachneifolia (Salisb.)
- Erica laeta (Bartl.)
- Erica laevigata (Bartl.)
- Erica lageniformis (Salisb.)
- Erica lananthera (L.Bolus)
- Erica lanata (Andrews)
- Erica lanceolifera (S.Moore)
- Erica langebergensis (H.A.Baker)
- Erica lanipes (Guthrie & Bolus)
- Erica lanuginosa (Andrews)
- Erica lasciva (Salisb.)
- Erica lasiocarpa (Guthrie & Bolus)
- Erica lateralis (Willd.)
- Erica lateriflora (E.G.H.Oliv.)
- Erica latiflora (L.Bolus)
- Erica latifolia (Andrews)
- Erica latituba (L.Bolus)
- Erica lavandulifolia (Salisb.)
- Erica lawsonia (Andrews)
- Erica lecomtei ((H.Perrier) Dorr & E.G.H.Oliv.)
- Erica lehmannii (Klotzsch ex Benth.)
- Erica lepidota (Rach)
- Erica leptantha (Dulfer)
- Erica leptoclada (Van Heurck & Müll.Arg.)
- Erica leptopus (Benth.)
- Erica lerouxiae (Bolus)
- Erica leucantha (Link)
- Erica leucanthera (L.f.)
- Erica leucoclada ((Baker) Dorr & E.G.H.Oliv.)
- Erica leucodesmia (Benth.)
- Erica leucopelta (Tausch)
- Erica leucosiphon (L.Bolus)
- Erica leucotrachela (H.A.Baker)
- Erica lignosa (H.A.Baker)
- Erica limnophila (E.G.H.Oliv.)
- Erica limosa (L.Bolus)
- Erica lithophila (E.G.H.Oliv. & I.M.Oliv.)
- Erica loganii (Compton)
- Erica longiaristata (Benth.)
- Erica longimontana (E.G.H.Oliv.)
- Erica longipedunculata (G.Lodd.)
- Erica longistyla (L.Bolus)
- Erica lowryensis (Bolus)
- Erica lucida (Salisb.)
- Erica lusitanica (Rudolph)
- Erica lutea (P.J.Bergius)
- Erica lyallii (Dorr & E.G.H.Oliv.)
- Erica lycopodiastrum (Lam.)

== M ==
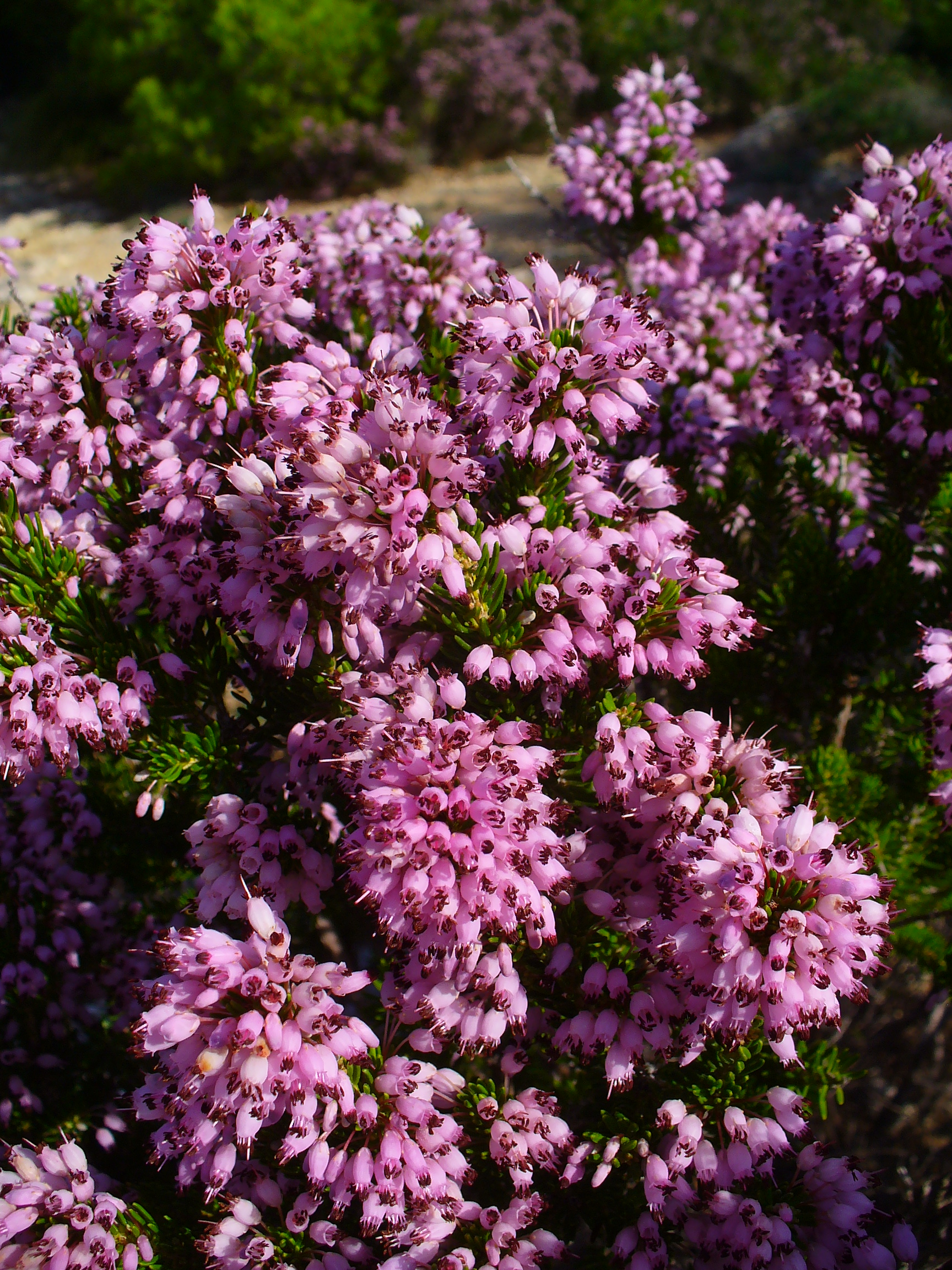
Erica multiflora

- Erica macilenta (Guthrie & Bolus)
- Erica mackayana (Bab.)
- Erica macowanii (Cufino)
- Erica macrocalyx ((Baker) Dorr & E.G.H.Oliv.)
- Erica macroloma (Benth.)
- Erica macrophylla (Klotzsch ex Benth.)
- Erica macrotrema (Guthrie & Bolus)
- Erica madagascariensis ((H.Perrier) Dorr & E.G.H.Oliv.)
- Erica maderensis ((Benth.) Bornm.)
- Erica maderi (Guthrie & Bolus)
- Erica madida (E.G.H.Oliv.)
- Erica maesta (Bolus)
- Erica mafiensis ((Engl.) Dorr)
- Erica magistrati (E.G.H.Oliv.)
- Erica magnisylvae (E.G.H.Oliv.)
- Erica malmesburiensis (E.G.H.Oliv.)
- Erica mammosa (L.)
- Erica manifesta (Compton)
- Erica manipuliflora (Salisb.)
- Erica mannii ((Hook.f.) Beentje)
- Erica margaritacea (Aiton)
- Erica marifolia (Aiton)
- Erica maritima (Guthrie & Bolus)
- Erica marlothii (Bolus)
- Erica marojejyensis (Dorr)
- Erica massonii (L.f.)
- Erica mauritanica (L.)
- Erica mauritiensis (E.G.H.Oliv.)
- Erica maximiliani (Guthrie & Bolus ex Schltr.)
- Erica media (Klotzsch ex Benth.)
- Erica melanacme (Guthrie & Bolus)
- Erica melanomontana (E.G.H.Oliv.)
- Erica melanthera (L.)
- Erica melastoma (Andrews)
- Erica merxmuelleri (Dulfer)
- Erica micrandra (Guthrie & Bolus)
- Erica microcodon (Guthrie & Bolus)
- Erica microdonta ((C.H.Wright) E.G.H.Oliv.)
- Erica milanjiana (Bolus)
- Erica miniscula (E.G.H.Oliv.)
- Erica minutifolia ((Baker) Dorr & E.G.H.Oliv.)
- Erica minutissima (Klotzsch ex Benth.)
- Erica mira (Klotzsch ex Benth.)
- Erica mitchelliensis (Dulfer)
- Erica modesta (Salisb.)
- Erica mollis (Andrews)
- Erica monadelphia (Andrews)
- Erica monantha (Compton)
- Erica monsoniana (L.f.)
- Erica montis-hominis (E.G.H.Oliv.)
- Erica mucronata (Andrews)
- Erica muirii (L.Bolus)
- Erica multiflexuosa (E.G.H.Oliv.)
- Erica multiflora (L.)
- Erica multumbellifera (P.J.Bergius)
- Erica mundii (Guthrie & Bolus)
- Erica muscari (Andrews)
- Erica muscosa ((Aiton) E.G.H.Oliv.)
- Erica myriadenia ((Baker) Dorr & E.G.H.Oliv.)
- Erica myriocodon (Guthrie & Bolus)

== N ==
- Erica nabea (Guthrie & Bolus)
- Erica nana (Salisb.)
- Erica natalensis (Dulfer)
- Erica natalitia (Bolus)
- Erica navigatoris (E.G.H.Oliv.)
- Erica nematophylla (Guthrie & Bolus)
- Erica nemorosa (Klotzsch ex Benth.)
- Erica nervata (Guthrie & Bolus)
- Erica nevillei (L.Bolus)
- Erica newdigatei (Dulfer)
- Erica nidularia (G.Lodd.)
- Erica nigrimontana (Guthrie & Bolus)
- Erica nivalis (Andrews)
- Erica nivea (Sinclair)
- Erica niveniana (E.G.H.Oliv.)
- Erica notholeeana ((E.G.H.Oliv.) E.G.H.Oliv.)
- Erica nubigena (Bolus)
- Erica nudiflora (L.)
- Erica numidica ((Maire) Romo & Borat.)
- Erica nutans (J.C.Wendl.)
- Erica nyassana ((Alm & T.C.E.Fr.) E.G.H.Oliv.)

== O ==
- Erica oakesiorum (E.G.H.Oliv.)
- Erica oatesii (Rolfe)
- Erica obconica (H.A.Baker)
- Erica obliqua (Aiton)
- Erica oblongiflora (Benth.)
- Erica obtusata (Klotzsch ex Benth.)
- Erica occulta (E.G.H.Oliv.)
- Erica ocellata (Guthrie & Bolus)
- Erica octonaria (L.Bolus)
- Erica odorata (Andrews)
- Erica oligantha (Guthrie & Bolus)
- Erica oliveri (H.A.Baker)
- Erica omninoglabra (H.A.Baker)
- Erica onusta (Guthrie & Bolus)
- Erica oophylla (Benth.)
- Erica opulenta ((J.C.Wendl. ex Klotzsch) Benth.)
- Erica orculiflora (Dulfer)
- Erica oreina (Dulfer)
- Erica oreophila (Guthrie & Bolus)
- Erica oreotragus (E.G.H.Oliv.)
- Erica oresigena (Bolus)
- Erica orientalis (R.A.Dyer)
- Erica orthiocola (E.G.H.Oliv.)
- Erica ostiaria (Compton)
- Erica outeniquae ((Compton) E.G.H.Oliv.)
- Erica ovina (Klotzsch ex Benth.)
- Erica oxyandra (Guthrie & Bolus)
- Erica oxycoccifolia (Salisb.)
- Erica oxysepala (Guthrie & Bolus)

== P ==
- Erica pageana (L.Bolus)
- Erica palliiflora (Salisb.)
- Erica paludicola (L.Bolus)
- Erica paniculata (L.)
- Erica pannosa (Salisb.)
- Erica papyracea (Guthrie & Bolus)
- Erica parilis (Salisb.)
- Erica parkeri ((Baker) Dorr & E.G.H.Oliv.)
- Erica parviflora (L.)
- Erica parviporandra (E.G.H.Oliv.)
- Erica passerina (Montin)
- Erica passerinoides ((Bolus) E.G.H.Oliv.)
- Erica patens (Andrews)
- Erica patersonia (Andrews)
- Erica paucifolia ((J.C.Wendl.) E.G.H.Oliv.)
- Erica pauciovulata (H.A.Baker)
- Erica pearsoniana (L.Bolus)
- Erica pectinifolia (Salisb.)
- Erica pellucida (Sol. ex Salisb.)
- Erica peltata (Andrews)
- Erica penduliflora (E.G.H.Oliv.)
- Erica penicilliformis (Salisb.)
- Erica perhispida (Dorr & E.G.H.Oliv.)
- Erica perlata (Sinclair)
- Erica permutata (Dulfer)
- Erica perplexa (E.G.H.Oliv.)
- Erica perrieri (Dorr & E.G.H.Oliv.)
- Erica perspicua (J.C.Wendl.)
- Erica petiolaris (Lam.)
- Erica petraea (Benth.)
- Erica petricola (E.G.H.Oliv.)
- Erica petrophila (L.Bolus)
- Erica petrusiana (E.G.H.Oliv. & I.M.Oliv.)
- Erica phacelanthera (E.G.H.Oliv.)
- Erica phaeocarpa (E.G.H.Oliv.)
- Erica philippioides (Compton)
- Erica phillipsii (L.Bolus)
- Erica physantha (Benth.)
- Erica physodes (L.)
- Erica physophylla (Benth.)
- Erica pilaarkopensis (H.A.Baker)
- Erica pillansii (Bolus)
- Erica pilosiflora (E.G.H.Oliv.)
- Erica pilulifera (L.)
- Erica pinea (Thunb.)
- Erica piquetbergensis ((N.E.Br.) E.G.H.Oliv.)
- Erica placentiflora (Salisb.)
- Erica planifolia (L.)
- Erica platycalyx (E.G.H.Oliv.)
- Erica platycodon ((Webb & Berthel.) Rivas Mart. & al.)
- Erica pleiotricha (S.Moore)
- Erica plena (L.Bolus)
- Erica plukenetii (L.)
- Erica plumigera (Bartl.)
- Erica plumosa (Thunb.)
- Erica podophylla (Benth.)
- Erica pogonanthera (Bartl.)
- Erica polifolia (Salisb. ex Benth.)
- Erica polycoma (Benth.)
- Erica portenschlagiana (Dulfer)
- Erica praenitens (Tausch)
- Erica priori (Guthrie & Bolus)
- Erica procaviana ((E.G.H.Oliv.) E.G.H.Oliv.)
- Erica prolata (E.G.H.Oliv. & I.M.Oliv.)
- Erica propendens (Andrews)
- Erica propinqua (Guthrie & Bolus)
- Erica pseudocalycina (Compton)
- Erica psittacina (E.G.H.Oliv. & I.M.Oliv.)
- Erica puberuliflora (E.G.H.Oliv.)
- Erica pubescens (L.)
- Erica pubigera (Salisb.)
- Erica pudens (H.A.Baker)
- Erica pulchella (Houtt.)
- Erica pulchelliflora (E.G.H.Oliv.)
- Erica pulvinata (Guthrie & Bolus)
- Erica pumila (Andrews)
- Erica purgatoriensis (H.A.Baker)
- Erica pycnantha (Benth.)
- Erica pyramidalis (Aiton)
- Erica pyxidiflora (Salisb.)

== Q ==
- Erica quadrangularis (Salisb.)
- Erica quadratiflora ((H.Perrier) Dorr & E.G.H.Oliv.)
- Erica quadrifida ((Benth.) E.G.H.Oliv.)
- Erica quadrisulcata (L.Bolus)

== R ==
- Erica racemosa (Thunb.)
- Erica radicans ((L.Guthrie) E.G.H.Oliv.)
- Erica rakotozafyana (Dorr & E.G.H.Oliv.)
- Erica recta (Bolus)
- Erica recurvata (Andrews)
- Erica recurvifolia (E.G.H.Oliv.)
- Erica reenensis (Zahlbr.)
- Erica regerminans (L.)
- Erica regia (Bartl.)
- Erica rehmii (Dulfer)
- Erica remota ((N.E.Br.) E.G.H.Oliv.)
- Erica retorta (L.f.)
- Erica reunionensis (E.G.H.Oliv.)
- Erica revoluta ((Bolus) L.E.Davidson)
- Erica rhodantha (Guthrie & Bolus)
- Erica rhodopis ((Bolus) Bolus)
- Erica rhopalantha (Dulfer)
- Erica ribisaria (Guthrie & Bolus)
- Erica richardii (E.G.H.Oliv.)
- Erica rigidula ((N.E.Br.) E.G.H.Oliv.)
- Erica rimarum (E.G.H.Oliv.)
- Erica riparia (H.A.Baker)
- Erica rivularis (L.E.Davidson)
- Erica robynsiana (Spirlet)
- Erica rosacea ((L.Guthrie) E.G.H.Oliv.)
- Erica roseoloba (E.G.H.Oliv.)
- Erica rubens (Thunb.)
- Erica rubiginosa (Dulfer)
- Erica rudolfii (Bolus)
- Erica rufescens (Klotzsch)
- Erica rugata (E.G.H.Oliv.)
- Erica rupicola (Klotzsch)
- Erica russakiana (E.G.H.Oliv.)
- Erica rusticula (E.G.H.Oliv.)

== S ==
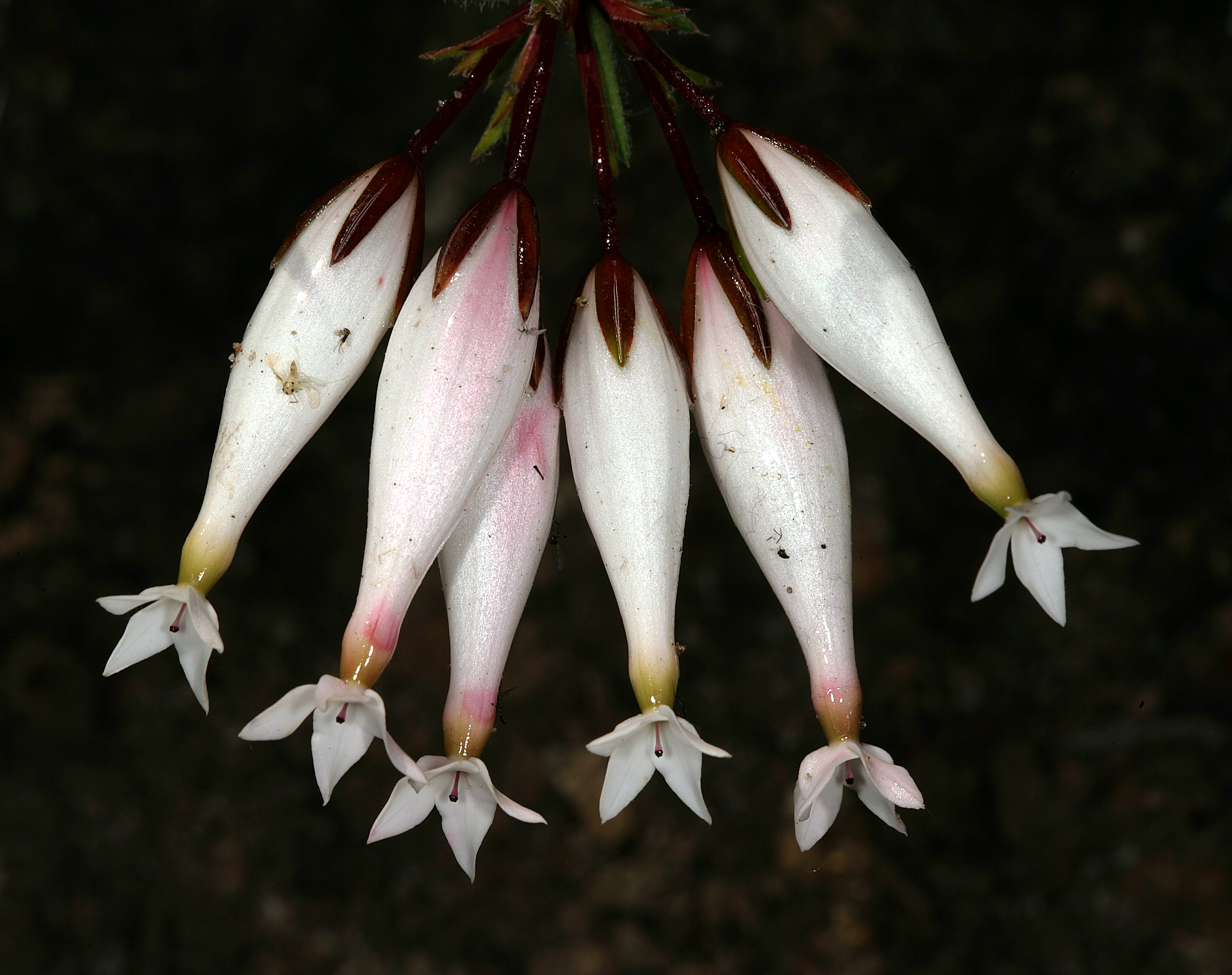
Erica shannonii

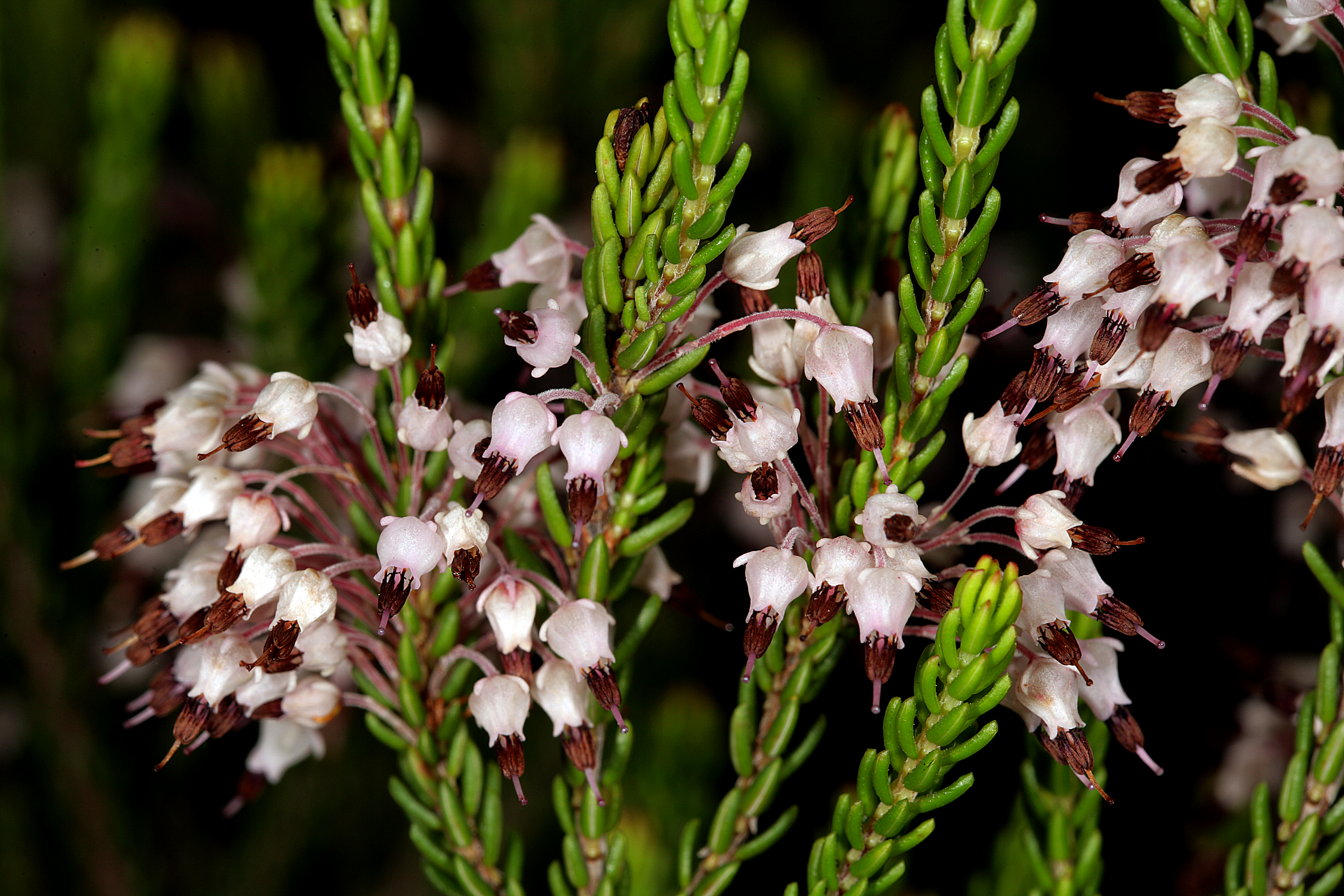
Erica scytophylla

- Erica sacciflora (Salisb.)
- Erica sagittata (Klotzsch ex Benth.)
- Erica salax (Salisb.)
- Erica salicina (E.G.H.Oliv.)
- Erica salteri (L.Bolus)
- Erica saptouensis (E.G.H.Oliv.)
- Erica savilea (Andrews)
- Erica saxicola (Guthrie & Bolus)
- Erica saxigena (Dulfer)
- Erica scabriuscula (Link)
- Erica schelpeorum (E.G.H.Oliv. & I.M.Oliv.)
- Erica schlechteri (Bolus)
- Erica schmidtii (Dulfer)
- Erica schumannii (E.G.H.Oliv.)
- Erica scoparia (L.)
- Erica scytophylla (Guthrie & Bolus)
- Erica selaginifolia (Salisb.)
- Erica senilis (Klotzsch ex Benth.)
- Erica seriphiifolia (Salisb.)
- Erica serrata (Thunb.)
- Erica sessiliflora (L.f.)
- Erica setacea (Andrews)
- Erica setociliata (H.A.Baker)
- Erica setosa (Bartl.)
- Erica setulosa (Benth.)
- Erica sexfaria (Aiton)
- Erica shannonea (Andrews)
- Erica sicifolia (Salisb.)
- Erica sicula (Guss.)
- Erica silvatica ((Welw. ex Engl.) Beentje)
- Erica simii ((S.Moore) E.G.H.Oliv.)
- Erica similis ((N.E.Br.) E.G.H.Oliv.)
- Erica sitiens (Klotzsch)
- Erica situshiemalis (E.G.H.Oliv. & Pirie)
- Erica sociorum (L.Bolus)
- Erica solandra (Andrews)
- Erica sonderiana (Guthrie & Bolus)
- Erica sonora (Compton)
- Erica sparrmanni (L.f.)
- Erica sparsa (Sinclair)
- Erica spectabilis (Klotzsch ex Benth.)
- Erica sperata (E.G.H.Oliv.)
- Erica sphaerocephala (J.C.Wendl. ex Benth.)
- Erica spiculifolia (Salisb.)
- Erica spinifera ((H.Perrier) Dorr & E.G.H.Oliv.)
- Erica spumosa (L.)
- Erica squarrosa (Salisb.)
- Erica stagnalis (Salisb.)
- Erica steinbergiana (H.L.Wendl. ex Klotzsch)
- Erica stenantha (Klotzsch ex Benth.)
- Erica stokoeanthus (E.G.H.Oliv.)
- Erica stokoei (L.Bolus)
- Erica straminea (J.C.Wendl.)
- Erica straussiana (Gilg)
- Erica strigilifolia (Salisb.)
- Erica strigosa (Aiton)
- Erica stylaris (Spreng.)
- Erica subcapitata ((N.E.Br.) E.G.H.Oliv.)
- Erica subdivaricata (P.J.Bergius)
- Erica subimbricata (Compton)
- Erica subterminalis (Klotzsch ex Benth.)
- Erica subulata (J.C.Wendl.)
- Erica subverticillaris (Diels ex L.Guthrie & Bolus)
- Erica suffulta (J.C.Wendl. ex Benth.)
- Erica swaziensis (E.G.H.Oliv.)
- Erica sylvainiana (Dorr & E.G.H.Oliv.)
- Erica symonsii (L.Bolus)
- Erica syngenesia (Compton)

== T ==
- Erica tarantulae (E.G.H.Oliv.)
- Erica taxifolia (Dryand.)
- Erica taylorii (E.G.H.Oliv.)
- Erica tegulifolia (Salisb.)
- Erica tenella (Andrews)
- Erica tenuicaulis (Klotzsch ex Benth.)
- Erica tenuifolia (L.)
- Erica tenuipes (Guthrie & Bolus)
- Erica tenuis (Salisb.)
- Erica terminalis (Salisb.)
- Erica terniflora (E.G.H.Oliv.)
- Erica tetragona (L.f.)
- Erica tetralix (L.)
- Erica tetrathecoides (Benth.)
- Erica thamnoides (E.G.H.Oliv.)
- Erica thimifolia (J.C.Wendl.)
- Erica thodei (Guthrie & Bolus)
- Erica thomae (L.Bolus)
- Erica thomensis ((Henriq.) Dorr & E.G.H.Oliv.)
- Erica thunbergii (Montin)
- Erica tomentosa (Salisb.)
- Erica toringbergensis (H.A.Baker)
- Erica totta (Thunb.)
- Erica tradouwensis (Compton)
- Erica tragomontana (R.C.Turner)
- Erica tragulifera (Salisb.)
- Erica triceps (Link)
- Erica trichadenia (Bolus)
- Erica trichoclada (Guthrie & Bolus)
- Erica trichophora (Benth.)
- Erica trichophylla (Benth.)
- Erica trichostigma (T.M.Salter)
- Erica trichroma (Benth.)
- Erica triflora (L.)
- Erica trimera ((Engl.) Beentje)
- Erica triphylla (Link)
- Erica tristis (Bartl.)
- Erica trivialis (Klotzsch ex Benth.)
- Erica truncata (L.Bolus)
- Erica tubercularis (Salisb.)
- Erica tumida (Ker Gawl.)
- Erica turbiniflora (Salisb.)
- Erica turgida (Salisb.)
- Erica turmalis (Salisb.)
- Erica turneri (E.G.H.Oliv.)
- Erica turrisbabylonica (H.A.Baker)
- Erica tysonii (Bolus)

== U ==
- Erica uberiflora (E.G.H.Oliv.)
- Erica umbellata (L.)
- Erica umbelliflora (Klotzsch ex Benth.)
- Erica umbonata (Compton)
- Erica umbratica (E.G.H.Oliv. & I.M.Oliv.)
- Erica unicolor (J.C.Wendl.)
- Erica unilateralis (Klotzsch ex Benth.)
- Erica urceolata ((Klotzsch) E.G.H.Oliv.)
- Erica urna-viridis (Bolus)
- Erica ustulescens (Guthrie & Bolus)
- Erica utriculosa (L.Bolus)
- Erica uysii (H.A.Baker)

== V ==
- Erica vagans (L.)
- Erica valida (H.A.Baker)
- Erica vallis-aranearum (E.G.H.Oliv.)
- Erica vallis-fluminis (E.G.H.Oliv.)
- Erica vallis-gratiae (Guthrie & Bolus)
- Erica vanheurckii (Müll.Arg.)
- Erica varderi (L.Bolus)
- Erica velatiflora (E.G.H.Oliv.)
- Erica velitaris (Salisb.)
- Erica ventricosa (Thunb.)
- Erica venustiflora (E.G.H.Oliv.)
- Erica verecunda (Salisb.)
- Erica vernicosa (E.G.H.Oliv.)
- Erica versicolor (Andrews)
- Erica verticillata (P.J.Bergius)
- Erica vestita (Thunb.)
- Erica viguieri ((H.Perrier) Dorr & E.G.H.Oliv.)
- Erica villosa (Andrews)
- Erica virginalis (Klotzsch ex Benth.)
- Erica viridiflora (Andrews)
- Erica viridimontana (E.G.H.Oliv. & I.M.Oliv.)
- Erica viscaria (L.)
- Erica viscosissima (E.G.H.Oliv.)
- Erica vlokii (E.G.H.Oliv.)
- Erica vogelpoelii (H.A.Baker)

== W ==
- Erica walkeria (Andrews)
- Erica wangfatiana (Dorr & E.G.H.Oliv.)
- Erica wendlandiana (Klotzsch)
- Erica whyteana (Britten)
- Erica wildii (Brenan)
- Erica williamsiorum (E.G.H.Oliv.)
- Erica winteri (H.A.Baker)
- Erica wittebergensis (Dulfer)
- Erica woodii (Bolus)
- Erica wyliei (Bolus)

== X ==
- Erica xanthina (Guthrie & Bolus)
- Erica xeranthemifolia (Salisb.)

== Z ==
- Erica zebrensis (Compton)
- Erica zeyheriana ((Klotzsch) E.G.H.Oliv.)
- Erica zitzikammensis (Dulfer)
- Erica zwartbergensis (Bolus)

== Named hybrids ==
- Erica × darleyensis Bean – artificial hybrid
- Erica × flavisepala Guthrie & Bolus
- Erica × fontensis T.M.Salter
- Erica × nelsonii Fagúndez
- Erica × stuartii (Macfarl.) Mast.
- Erica × veitchii Bean
- Erica × vinacea L.Bolus
- Erica × watsonii Benth.
- Erica × williamsii Druce
