= Erica strigosa =

Scientific classification
- Kingdom: Plantae
- Clade: Tracheophytes
- Clade: Angiosperms
- Clade: Eudicots
- Clade: Asterids
- Order: Ericales
- Family: Ericaceae
- Genus: Erica
- Species: E. strigosa

Binomial name
- Erica strigosa Aiton

Synonyms
- Erica arborea Thunb.; Erica axillaris Salisb.; Erica chamaetetralix Tausch; Erica lasiophylla Spreng.; Erica pilulifera J.C.Wendl.; Erica praecox Sinclair; Erica scabriuscula Drège ex Benth.; Ericoides strigosum (Sol.) Kuntze; Salaxis axillaris G.Don

Species of flowering plant

Erica strigosa is a plant belonging to the genus Erica. The species is endemic to the Western Cape.
