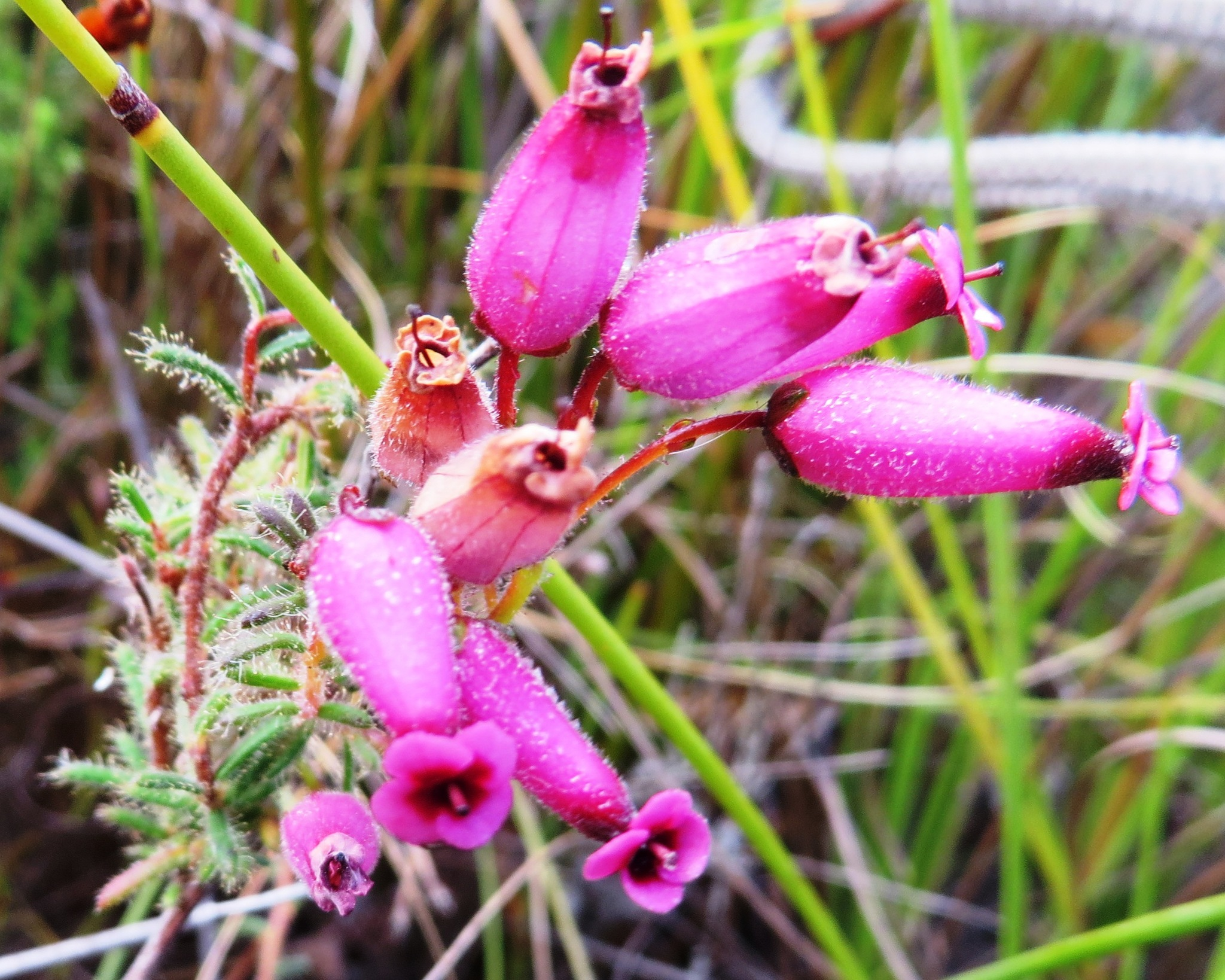

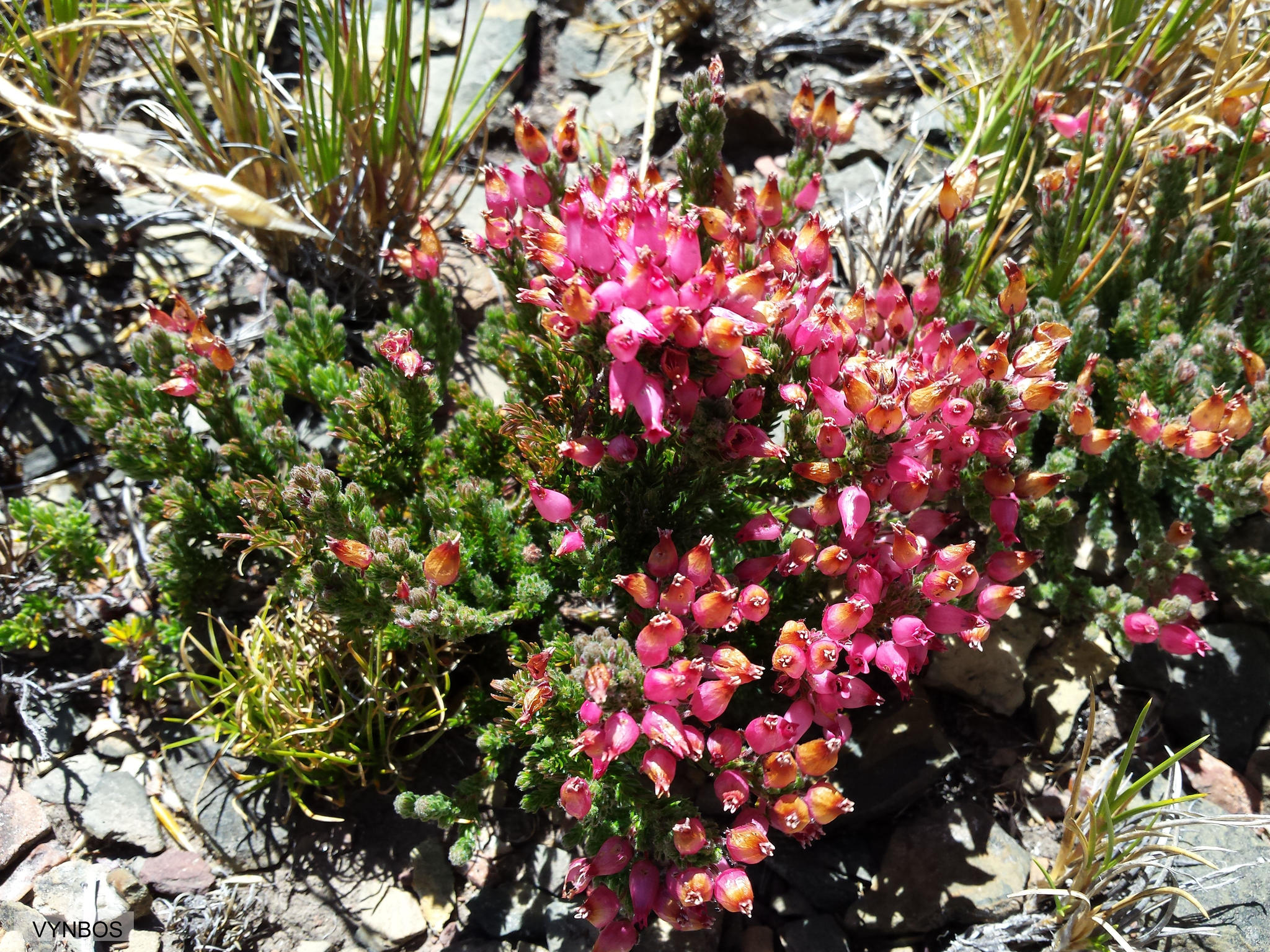

Scientific classification
- Kingdom: Plantae
- Clade: Tracheophytes
- Clade: Angiosperms
- Clade: Eudicots
- Clade: Asterids
- Order: Ericales
- Family: Ericaceae
- Genus: Erica
- Species: E. glutinosa

Binomial name
- Erica glutinosa P.J. Bergius

Synonyms
- Andromeda droseroides L.; Ceramia teucriifolia G.Don; Erica adenophora Spreng.; Erica droseroides Lam.; Erica teucriifolia Spreng.; Ericoides adenophorum (Spreng.) Kuntze; Ericoides glutinosum (P.J.Bergius) Kuntze; Ericoides teucriifolium (Spreng.) Kuntze

= Erica glutinosa =

Glue Heath

Species of flowering plant

Erica glutinosa, known as glue heath, is a plant belonging to the genus Erica and forming part of the fynbos. The species' scientific name was first published by P.J. Bergius. The species is endemic to the Western Cape.
