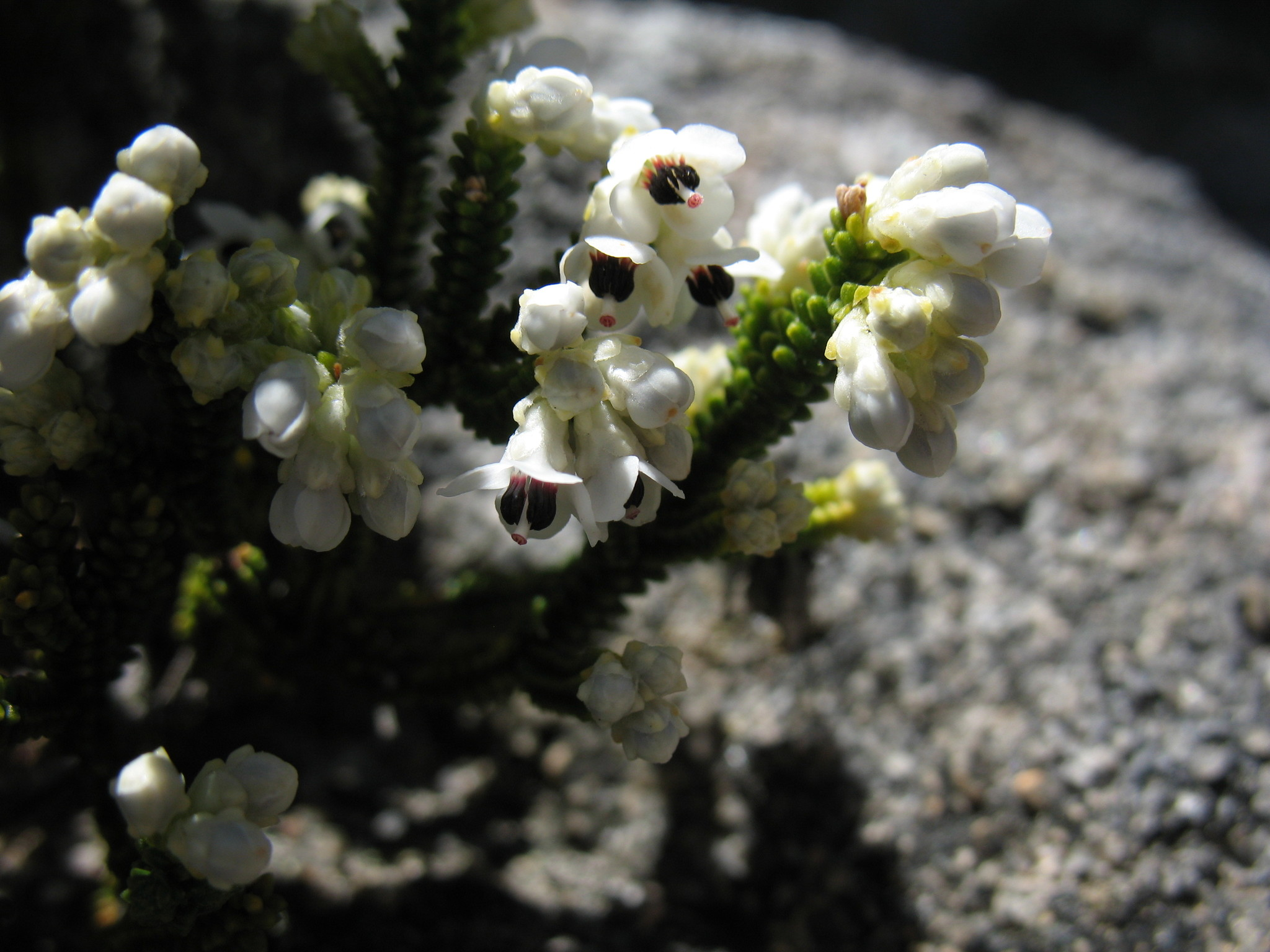

Scientific classification
- Kingdom: Plantae
- Clade: Tracheophytes
- Clade: Angiosperms
- Clade: Eudicots
- Clade: Asterids
- Order: Ericales
- Family: Ericaceae
- Genus: Erica
- Species: E. lachneifolia

Binomial name
- Erica lachneifolia Salisb.

Synonyms
- Erica lachnaea Andrews; Erica pohlmannii G.Lodd.; Ericoides lachnaeum (Andrews) Kuntze; Eurystegia lachneiflora G.Don; Gypsocallis pohlmannii G.Don

= Erica lachneifolia =

Species of flowering plant

Erica lachneifolia, the stiffleaf heath, is a plant belonging to the genus Erica and is part of the fynbos. The species is endemic to the Western Cape.
