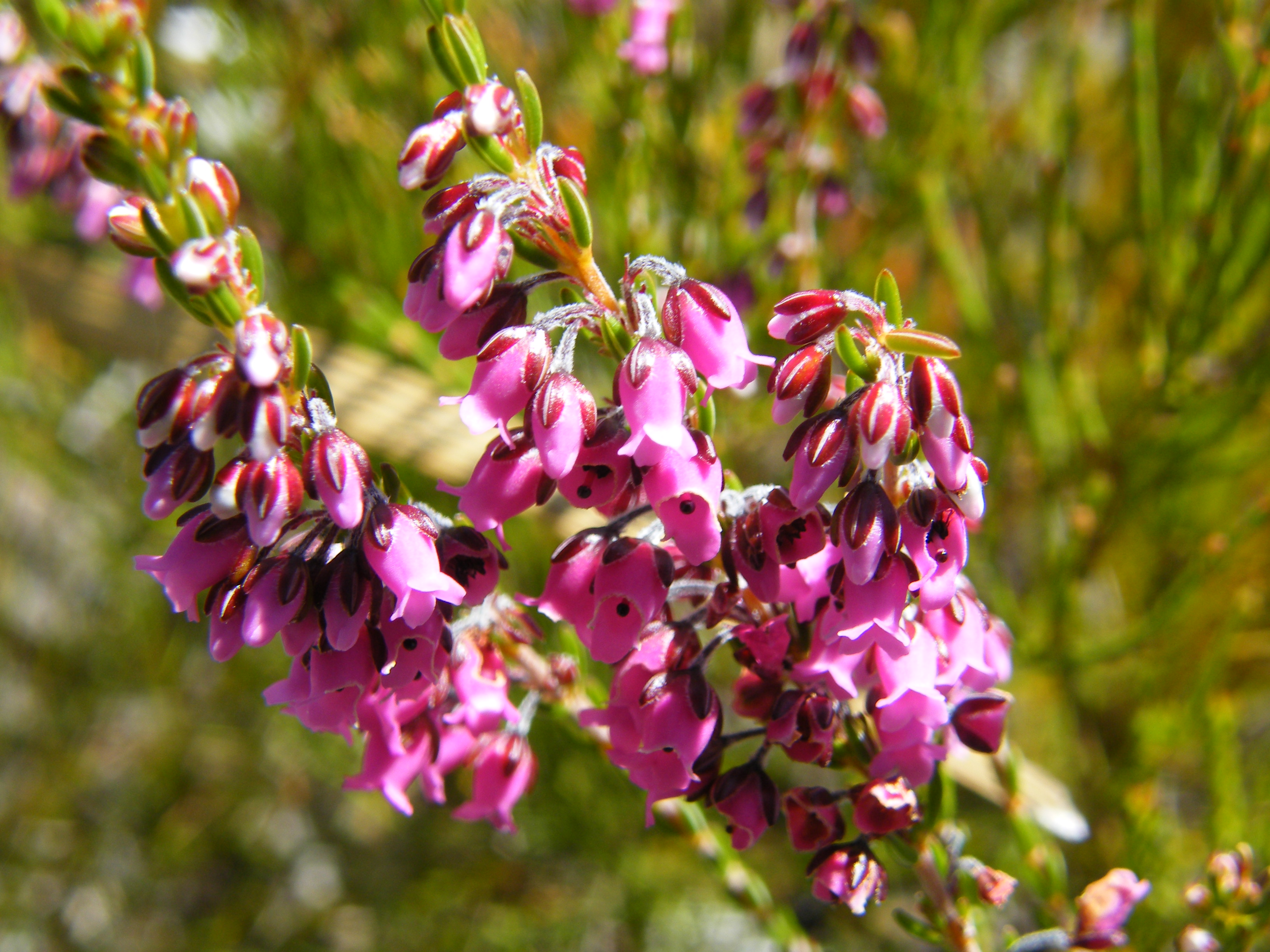

Scientific classification
- Kingdom: Plantae
- Clade: Tracheophytes
- Clade: Angiosperms
- Clade: Eudicots
- Clade: Asterids
- Order: Ericales
- Family: Ericaceae
- Genus: Erica
- Species: E. carduifolia

Binomial name
- Erica carduifolia Salisb., (1802)

Synonyms
- Erica aprica Klotzsch ex Benth.; Erica draconis L.Bolus; Ericoides carduifolium (Salisb.) Kuntze

= Erica carduifolia =

Species of flowering plant

Erica carduifolia is a plant belonging to the genus Erica and forming part of the fynbos. The species is endemic to the Western Cape.
