= Erica obliqua =

Scientific classification
- Kingdom: Plantae
- Clade: Tracheophytes
- Clade: Angiosperms
- Clade: Eudicots
- Clade: Asterids
- Order: Ericales
- Family: Ericaceae
- Genus: Erica
- Species: E. obliqua

Binomial name
- Erica obliqua Aiton, (1796)

Synonyms
- Ceramia obliqua G.Don; Ericoides obliquum (Aiton) Kuntze

Species of flowering plant

Erica obliqua is a plant belonging to the genus Erica and is part of the fynbos. The species is endemic to the Western Cape.
