= Erica madagascariensis =

Conservation status
- Vulnerable (IUCN 3.1)

Scientific classification
- Kingdom: Plantae
- Clade: Tracheophytes
- Clade: Angiosperms
- Clade: Eudicots
- Clade: Asterids
- Order: Ericales
- Family: Ericaceae
- Genus: Erica
- Species: E. madagascariensis

Binomial name
- Erica madagascariensis (H.Perrier) Dorr & E.G.H.Oliv.

Synonyms
- Mitrastylus pilosus (Baker) Alm & T.C.E.Fr.; Philippia madagascariensis H.Perrier; Philippia pilosa Baker

Species of flowering plant

Erica madagascariensis is a plant belonging to the genus Erica. The species is endemic to Madagascar.
