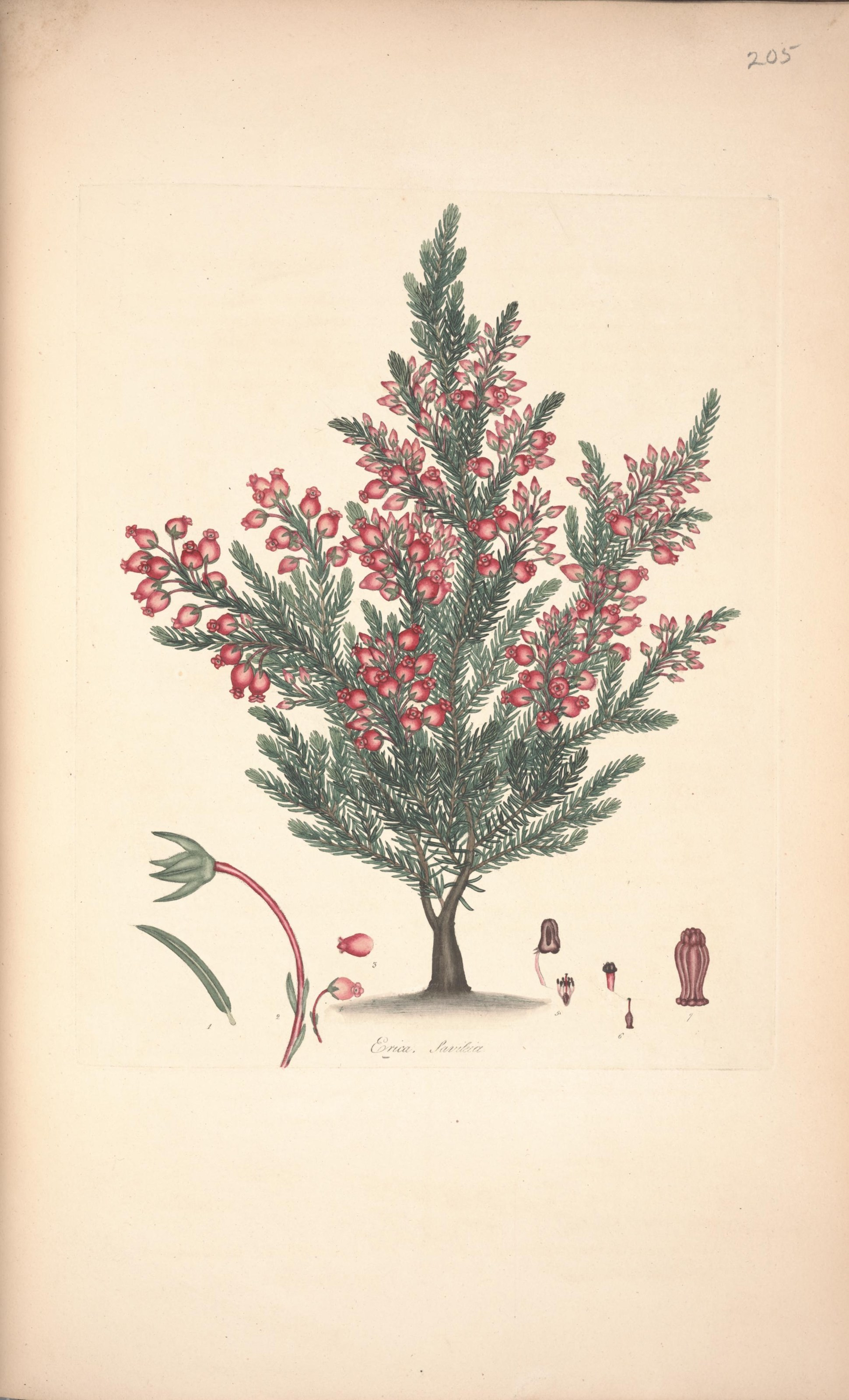

Scientific classification
- Kingdom: Plantae
- Clade: Tracheophytes
- Clade: Angiosperms
- Clade: Eudicots
- Clade: Asterids
- Order: Ericales
- Family: Ericaceae
- Genus: Erica
- Species: E. savilea

Binomial name
- Erica savilea Andrews

Synonyms
- Erica delecta Tausch; Erica savileana Sweet; Erica savileia Andrews; Erica savilliae G.Lodd.; Erica tristis Klotzsch

= Erica savilea =

Species of flowering plant

Erica savilea is a plant belonging to the genus Erica. The species is endemic to the Western Cape.
