= Erica thomensis =

Conservation status
- Critically Endangered (IUCN 3.1)

Scientific classification
- Kingdom: Plantae
- Clade: Tracheophytes
- Clade: Angiosperms
- Clade: Eudicots
- Clade: Asterids
- Order: Ericales
- Family: Ericaceae
- Genus: Erica
- Species: E. thomensis

Binomial name
- Erica thomensis (Henriq.) Dorr & E.G.H.Oliv.

Synonyms
- Philippia thomensis Henriq.

Species of plant

Erica thomensis is a species of flowering plant belonging to the genus Erica and is native to São Tomé.
