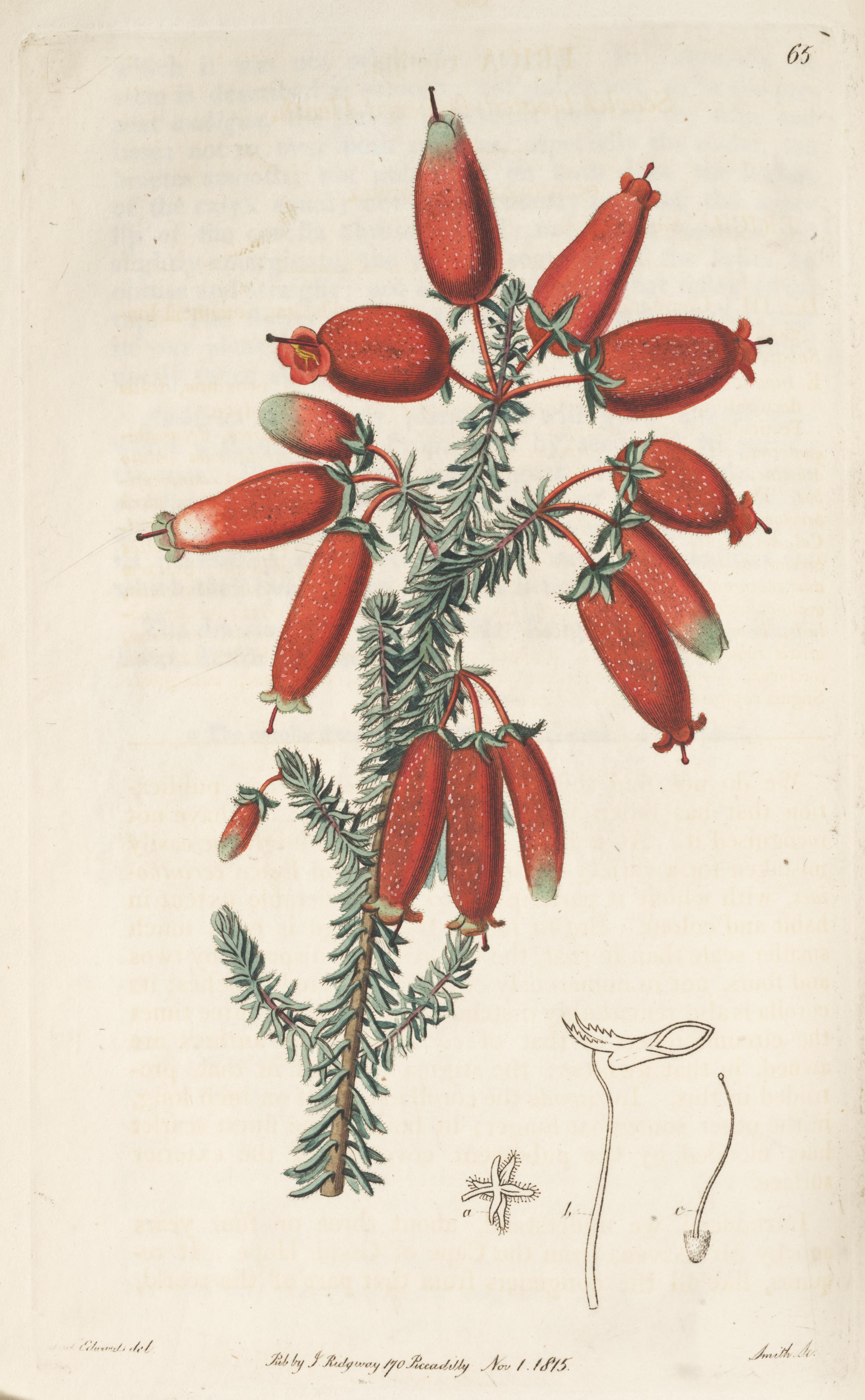

Scientific classification
- Kingdom: Plantae
- Clade: Tracheophytes
- Clade: Angiosperms
- Clade: Eudicots
- Clade: Asterids
- Order: Ericales
- Family: Ericaceae
- Genus: Erica
- Species: E. tumida

Binomial name
- Erica tumida Ker Gawl.

Synonyms
- Erica splendens Andrews; Ericoides splendens Kuntze; Syringodea tumida G.Don

= Erica tumida =

Species of flowering plant

Erica tumida is a plant belonging to the genus Erica. The species is endemic to the Western Cape.
