= Erica goudotiana =

Conservation status
- Least Concern (IUCN 3.1)

Scientific classification
- Kingdom: Plantae
- Clade: Tracheophytes
- Clade: Angiosperms
- Clade: Eudicots
- Clade: Asterids
- Order: Ericales
- Family: Ericaceae
- Genus: Erica
- Species: E. goudotiana

Binomial name
- Erica goudotiana (Klotzsch) Dorr & E.G.H.Oliv., (1999)

Synonyms
- Philippia cauliflora Hochr.; Philippia goudotiana Klotzsch; Philippia tenuifolia Benth.; Salaxis goudotiana (Klotzsch) D.Dietr.; Salaxis tenuifolia D.Dietr.

Species of flowering plant

Erica goudotiana is a plant belonging to the genus Erica. The species is endemic to Madagascar.
