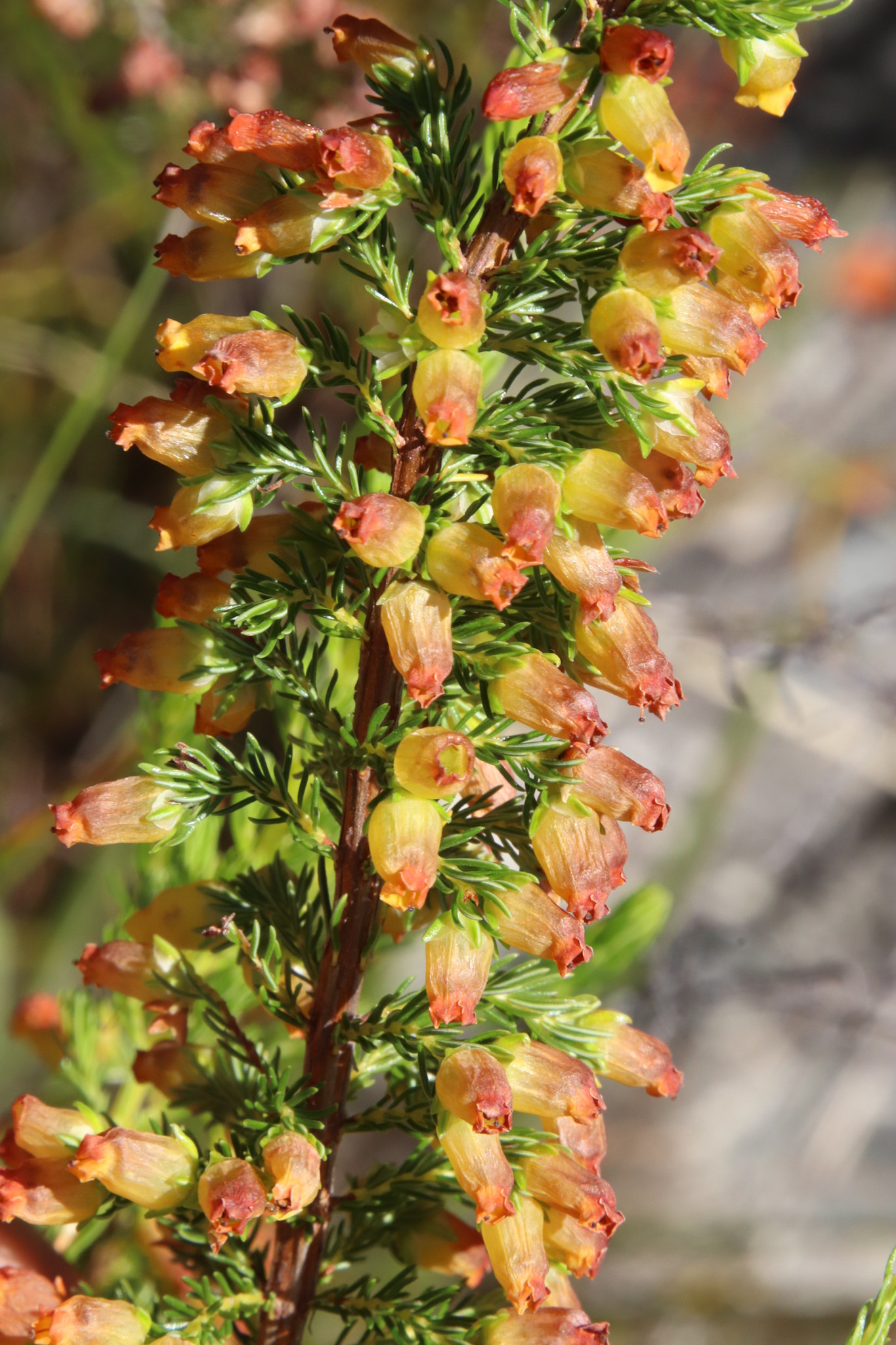

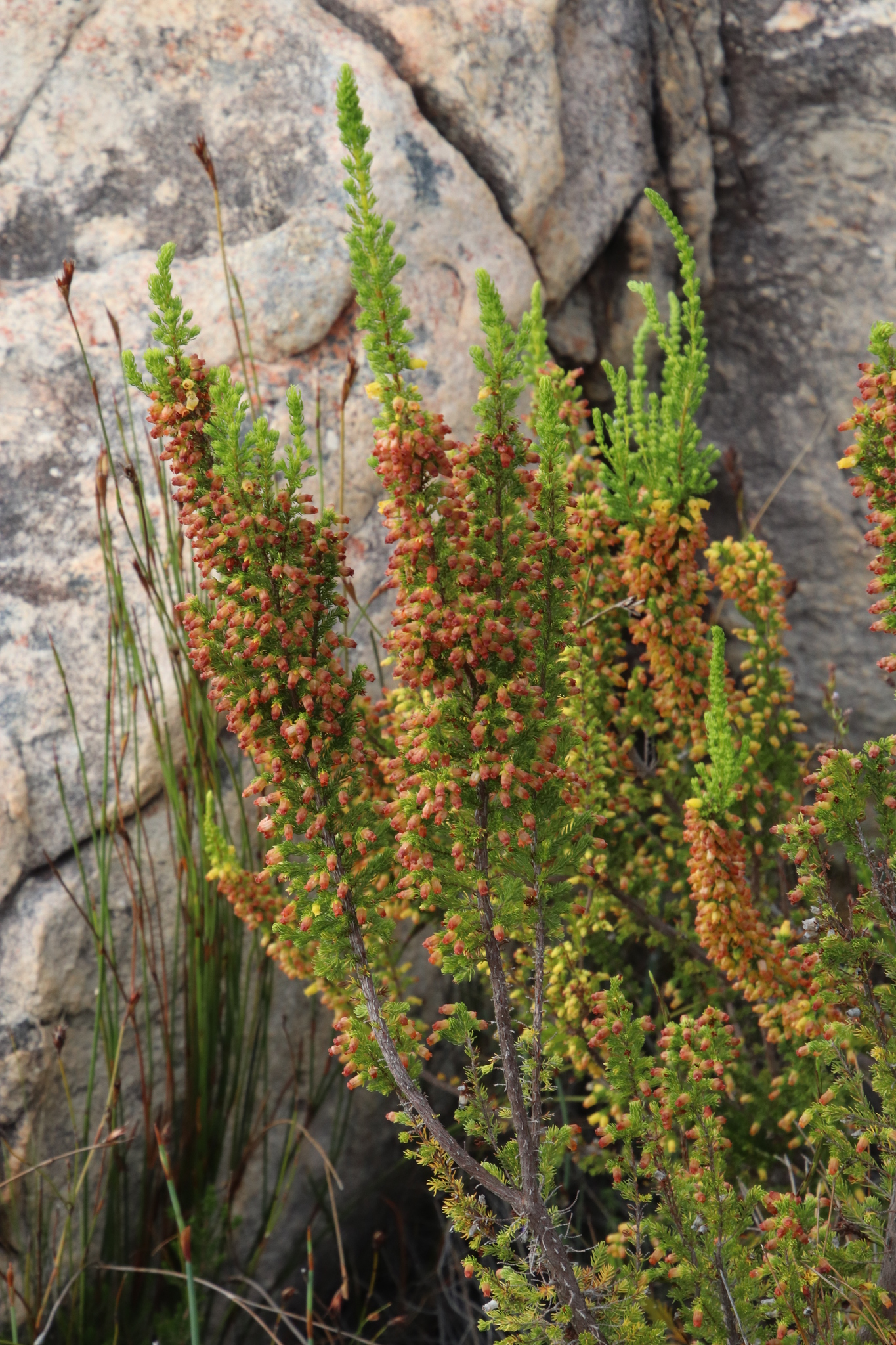

Scientific classification
- Kingdom: Plantae
- Clade: Tracheophytes
- Clade: Angiosperms
- Clade: Eudicots
- Clade: Asterids
- Order: Ericales
- Family: Ericaceae
- Genus: Erica
- Species: E. blandfordia

Binomial name
- Erica blandfordia Andrews

Synonyms
- Erica blandfordiana W.T.Aiton; Ericoides blandfordium (Andrews) Kuntze

= Erica blandfordia =

Species of flowering plant

Erica blandfordia, the wax heath, is a plant belonging to the genus Erica and forming part of the fynbos. The species is endemic to the Western Cape.
