= Erica bibax =

Scientific classification
- Kingdom: Plantae
- Clade: Tracheophytes
- Clade: Angiosperms
- Clade: Eudicots
- Clade: Asterids
- Order: Ericales
- Family: Ericaceae
- Genus: Erica
- Species: E. bibax

Binomial name
- Erica bibax Salisb.

Synonyms
- Erica flammea Andrews; Ericoides flammeum (Andrews) Kuntze; Syringodea flammea (Andrews) G.Don

Species of flowering plant

Erica bibax is a plant belonging to the genus Erica and forming part of the fynbos. The species is endemic to the Western Cape.
