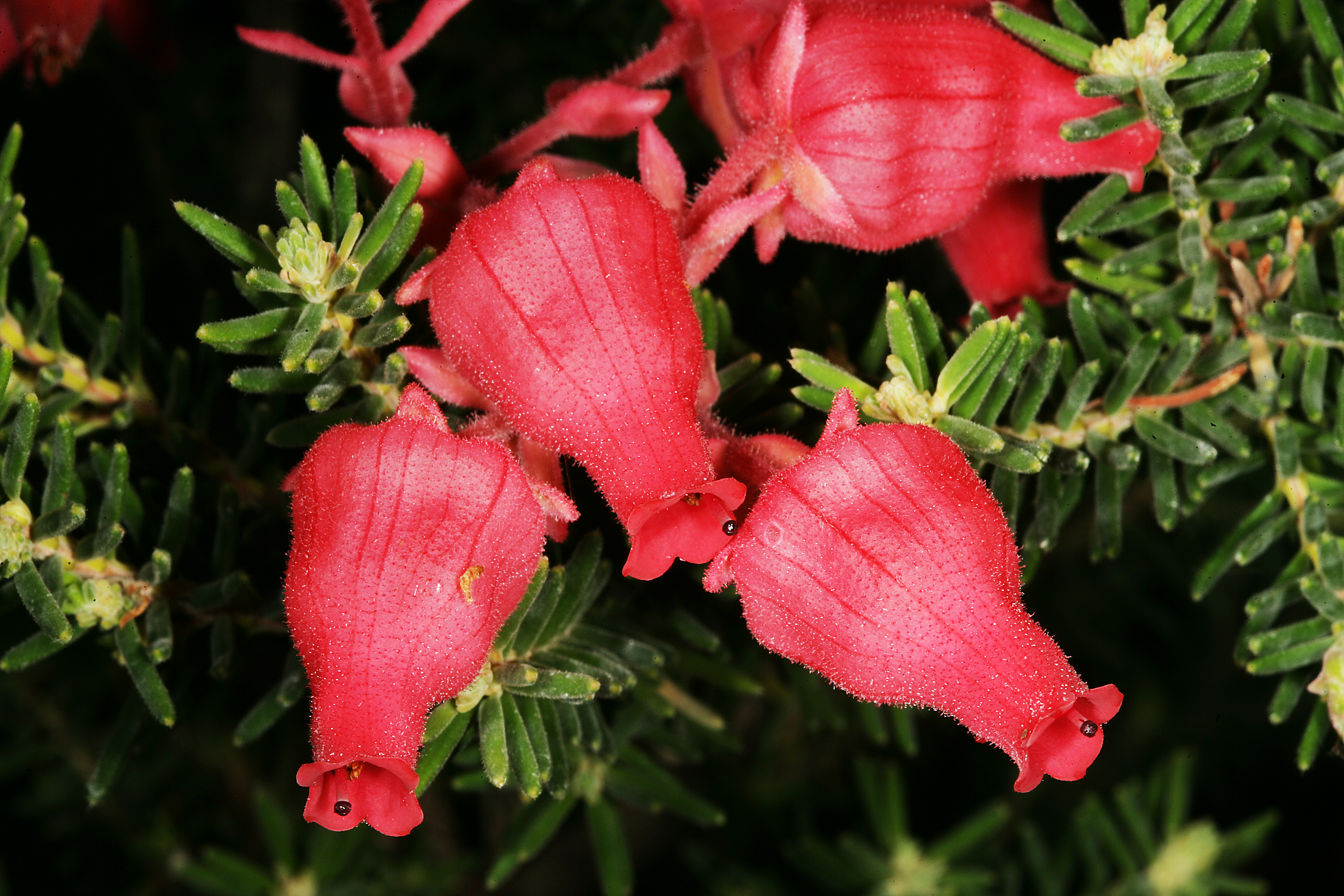

Scientific classification
- Kingdom: Plantae
- Clade: Tracheophytes
- Clade: Angiosperms
- Clade: Eudicots
- Clade: Asterids
- Order: Ericales
- Family: Ericaceae
- Genus: Erica
- Species: E. cameronii

Binomial name
- Erica cameronii L.Bolus, (1918)

= Erica cameronii =

Species of flowering plant

Erica cameronii, the Hex River heath, Cameron’s heath and crimson heath, is a plant belonging to the genus Erica and forming part of the fynbos. The species is endemic to the Western Cape.
