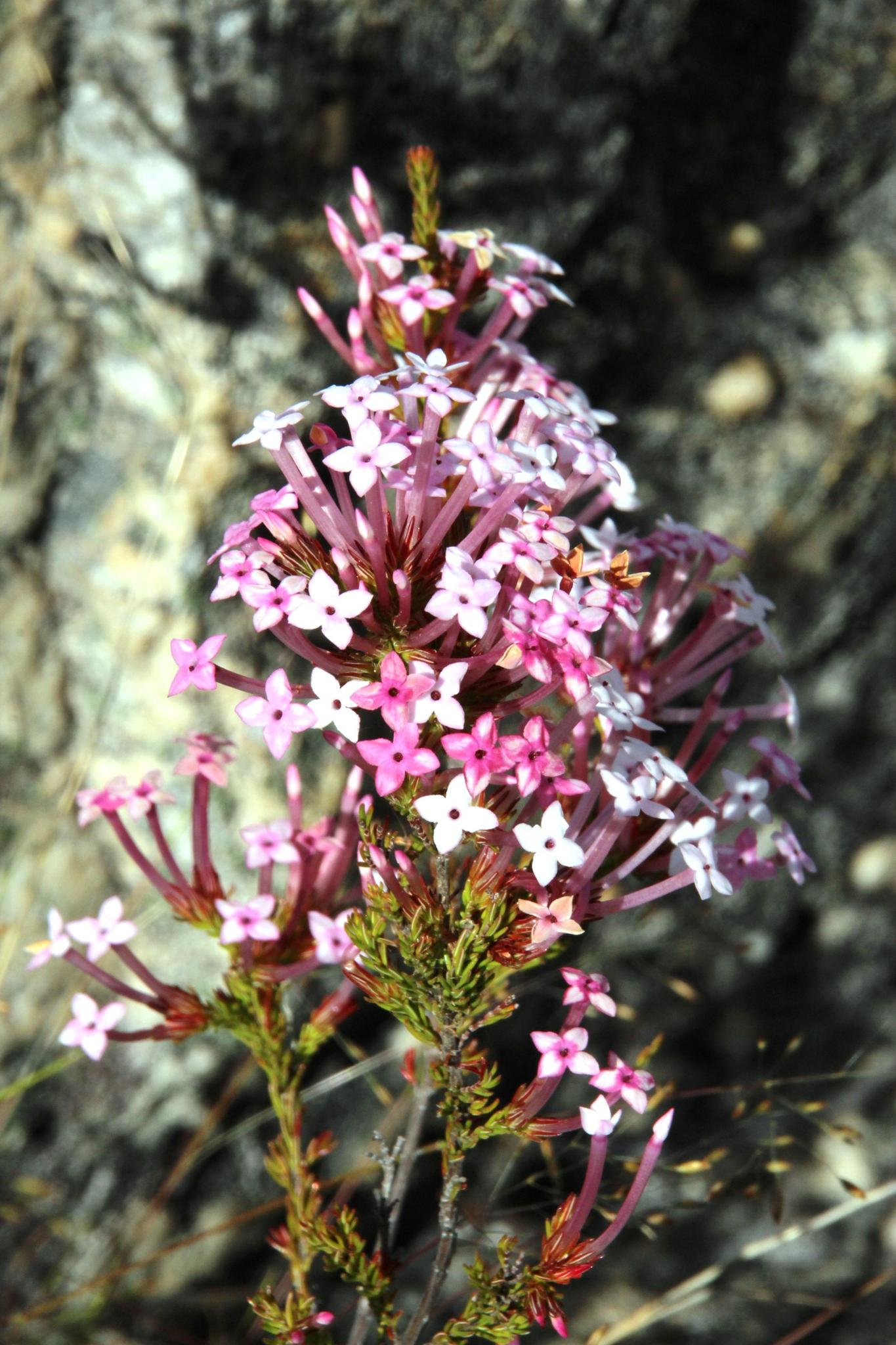

Scientific classification
- Kingdom: Plantae
- Clade: Tracheophytes
- Clade: Angiosperms
- Clade: Eudicots
- Clade: Asterids
- Order: Ericales
- Family: Ericaceae
- Genus: Erica
- Species: E. infundibuliformis

Binomial name
- Erica infundibuliformis Andrews

Synonyms
- Callista coventryana G.Don; Callista infundibuliformis G.Don; Callista pavettiflora G.Don; Erica coventrya Andrews; Erica hypocrateriformis Tausch; Erica pavettiflora Salisb.; Ericoides pavettiflorum (Salisb.) Kuntze

= Erica infundibuliformis =

Species of flowering plant

Erica infundibuliformis is a plant belonging to the genus Erica. The species is endemic to the Western Cape.
