= Erica intervallaris =

Scientific classification
- Kingdom: Plantae
- Clade: Tracheophytes
- Clade: Angiosperms
- Clade: Eudicots
- Clade: Asterids
- Order: Ericales
- Family: Ericaceae
- Genus: Erica
- Species: E. intervallaris

Binomial name
- Erica intervallaris Salisb.

Synonyms
- Erica alopecuroides J.C.Wendl.; Erica duthieae L.Bolus; Erica elongata Roxb. ex G.Don

Species of flowering plant

Erica intervallaris is a plant belonging to the genus Erica and is part of the fynbos. The species is endemic to the Western Cape.

The plant also has one variety: Erica intervallaris var. trifolia H.A.Baker
