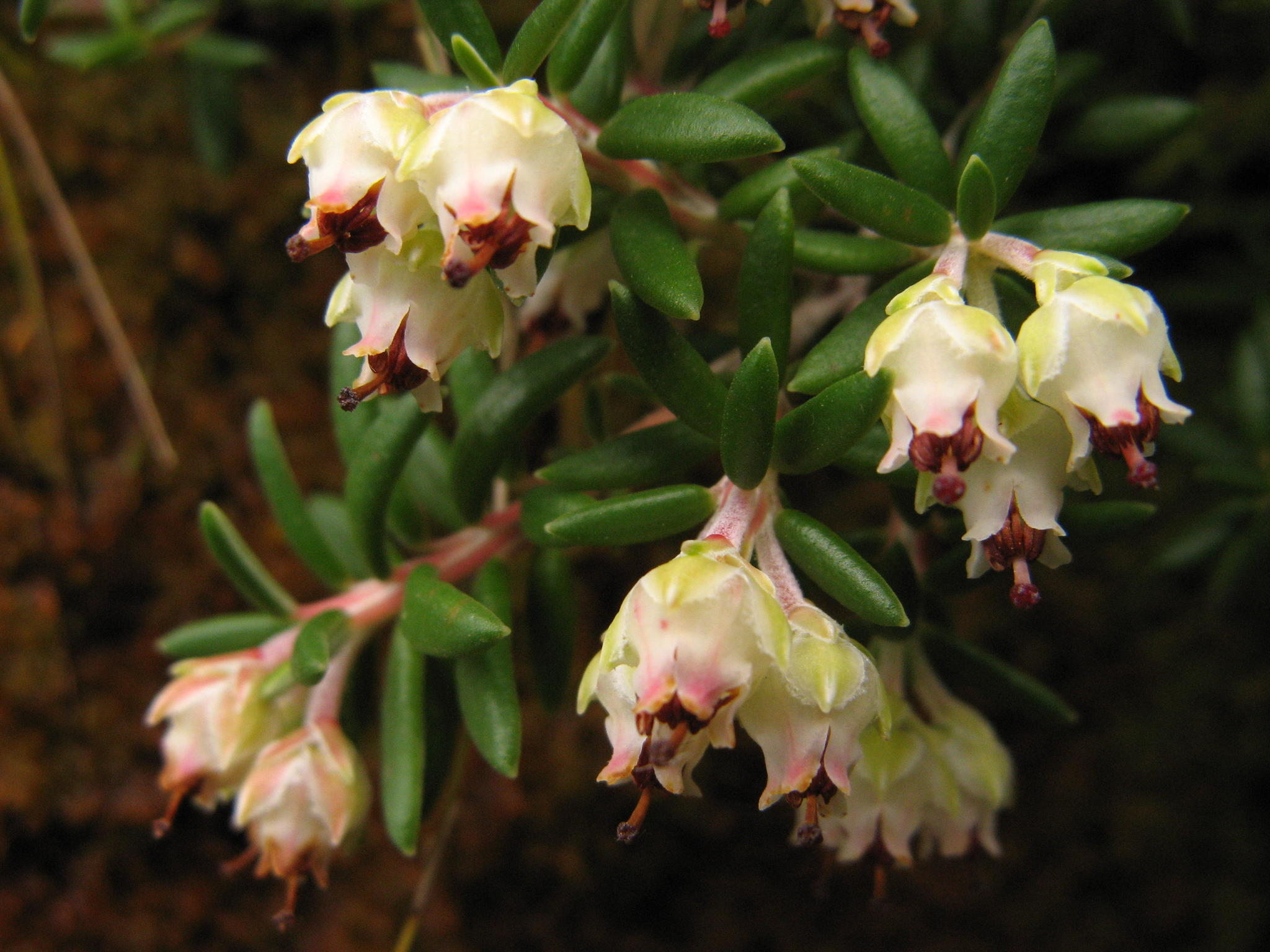

Scientific classification
- Kingdom: Plantae
- Clade: Tracheophytes
- Clade: Angiosperms
- Clade: Eudicots
- Clade: Asterids
- Order: Ericales
- Family: Ericaceae
- Genus: Erica
- Species: E. petiolaris

Binomial name
- Erica petiolaris Lam.

Synonyms
- Erica petiolaris Salisb.; Erica petiolata Thunb.; Ericoides petiolatum (Thunb.) Kuntze; Eurylepis petiolata (Thunb.) G.Don

= Erica petiolaris =

Species of flowering plant

Erica petiolaris is a plant belonging to the genus Erica and is part of the fynbos. The species is endemic to the Western Cape.
