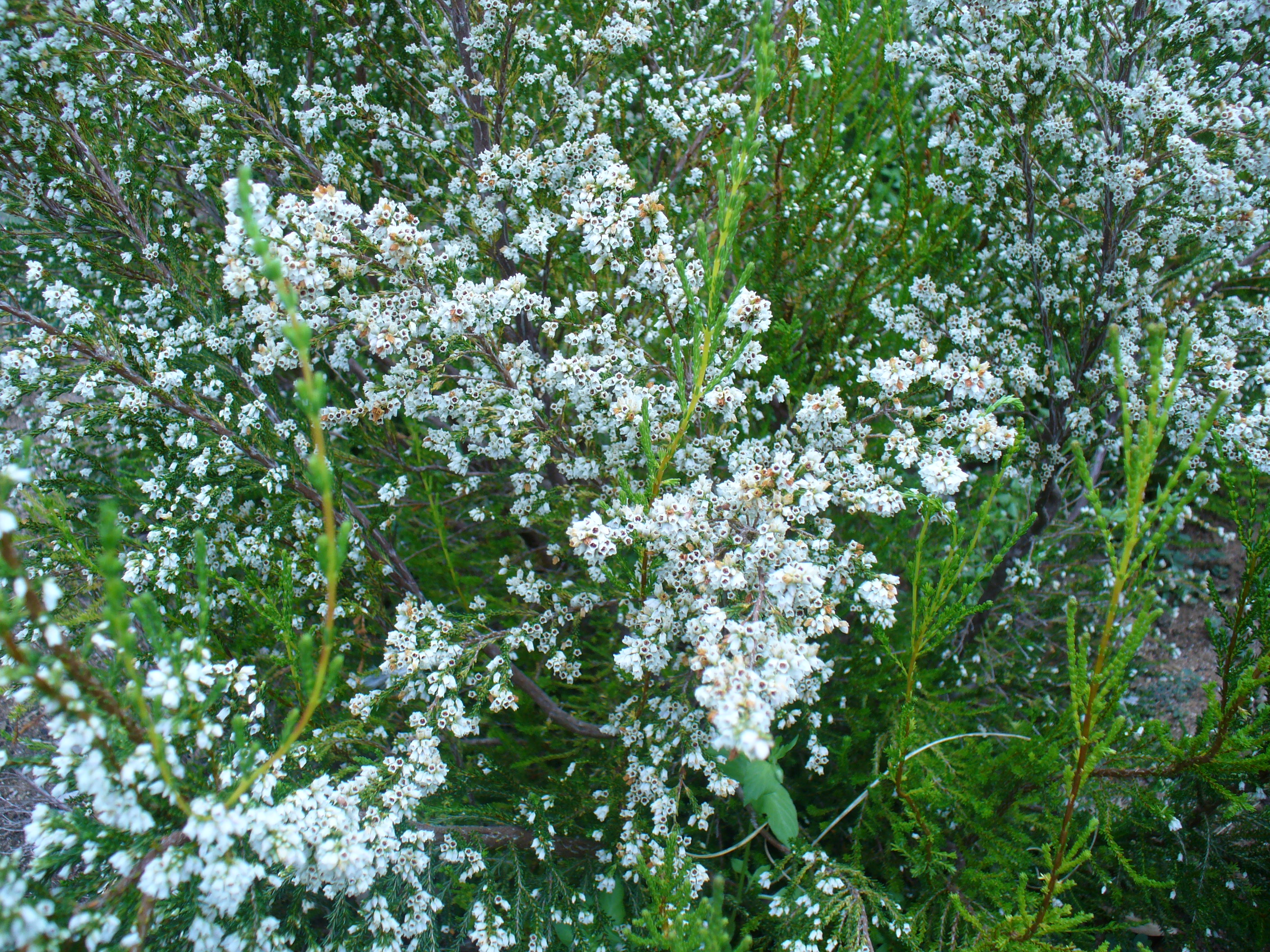

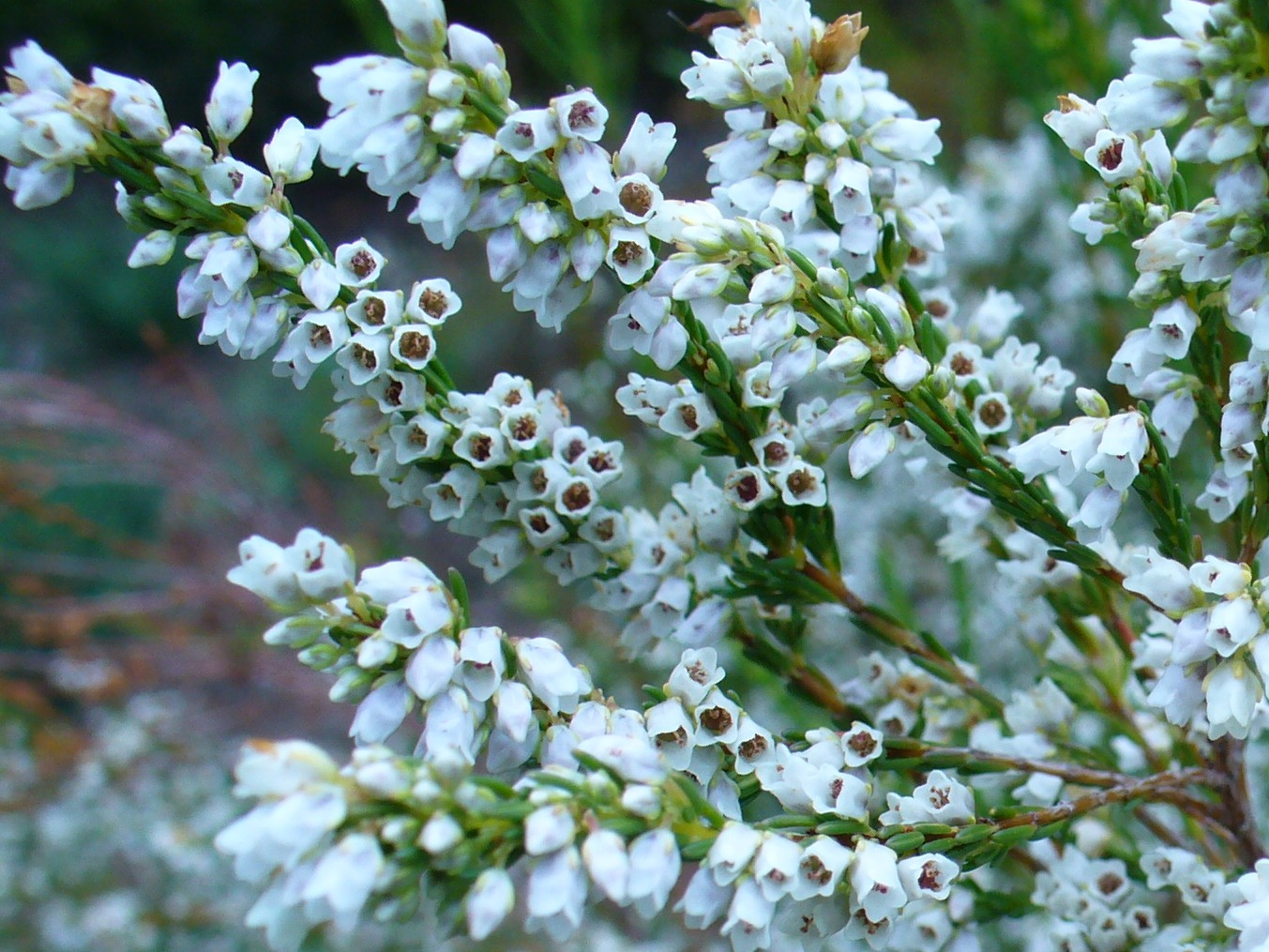

Scientific classification
- Kingdom: Plantae
- Clade: Tracheophytes
- Clade: Angiosperms
- Clade: Eudicots
- Clade: Asterids
- Order: Ericales
- Family: Ericaceae
- Genus: Erica
- Species: E. leucantha

Binomial name
- Erica leucantha Link

Synonyms
- Erica leucanthera Andrews; Erica luteoalba J.Forbess; Ericoides luteoalbum (Link) Kuntzes; Lamprotis bedfordiana G.Dons

= Erica leucantha =

Species of flowering plant

Erica leucantha is a plant belonging to the genus Erica and is part of the fynbos. The species is endemic to the Western Cape.
