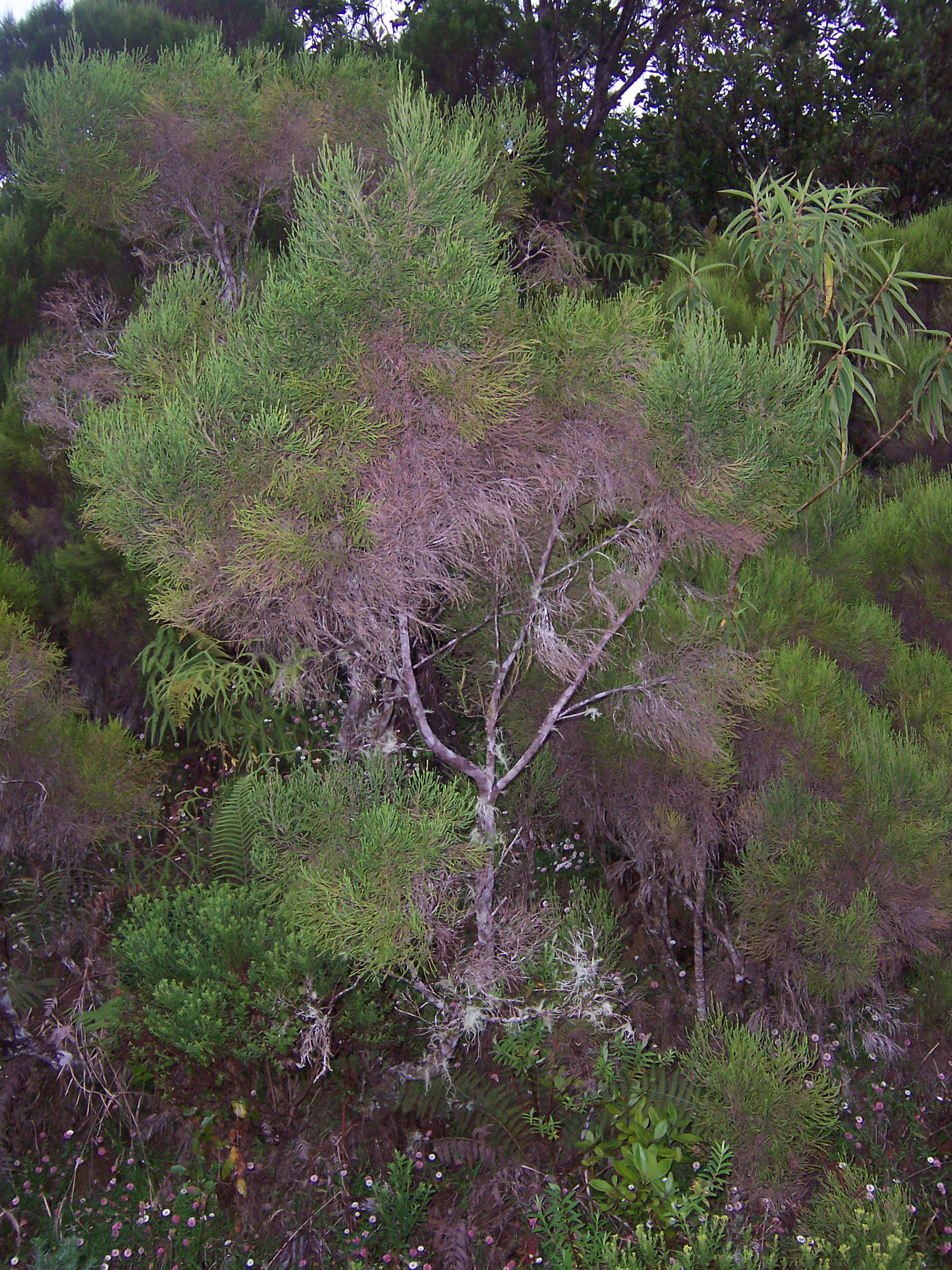

Scientific classification
- Kingdom: Plantae
- Clade: Tracheophytes
- Clade: Angiosperms
- Clade: Eudicots
- Clade: Asterids
- Order: Ericales
- Family: Ericaceae
- Genus: Erica
- Species: E. arborescens

Binomial name
- Erica arborescens (Willd.) E.G.H.Oliv.

Synonyms
- Philippia arborescens (Willd.) Klotzsch; Philippia scyphostigma Cordem.; Salaxis arborescens Willd.

= Erica arborescens =

Species of flowering plant

Erica arborescens is a plant belonging to the genus Erica and is endemic to Réunion.
