= Erica racemosa =

Conservation status
- Least Concern (IUCN 3.1)

Scientific classification
- Kingdom: Plantae
- Clade: Tracheophytes
- Clade: Angiosperms
- Clade: Eudicots
- Clade: Asterids
- Order: Ericales
- Family: Ericaceae
- Genus: Erica
- Species: E. racemosa

Binomial name
- Erica racemosa Thunb., (1785)

Synonyms
- Erica flexilis Salisb.; Erica hispida Andrews; Ericoides racemosum (Thunb.) Kuntze; Gypsocallis flexilis G.Don; Gypsocallis hispida G.Don

Species of flowering plant

Erica racemosa is a plant belonging to the genus Erica. The species is endemic to the Western Cape.
