= Erica wildii =

Conservation status
- Least Concern (IUCN 3.1)

Scientific classification
- Kingdom: Plantae
- Clade: Tracheophytes
- Clade: Angiosperms
- Clade: Eudicots
- Clade: Asterids
- Order: Ericales
- Family: Ericaceae
- Genus: Erica
- Species: E. wildii

Binomial name
- Erica wildii Brenan

Species of flowering plant

Erica wildii is a plant belonging to the genus Erica. The species is native to Mozambique and Zimbabwe.
