= Erica barnettiana =

Conservation status
- Critically Endangered (IUCN 3.1)

Scientific classification
- Kingdom: Plantae
- Clade: Tracheophytes
- Clade: Angiosperms
- Clade: Eudicots
- Clade: Asterids
- Order: Ericales
- Family: Ericaceae
- Genus: Erica
- Species: E. barnettiana

Binomial name
- Erica barnettiana Dorr & E.G.H.Oliv., (1999)

Synonyms
- Philippia oppositifolia H.Perrier

Species of flowering plant

Erica barnettiana is a plant belonging to the genus Erica and is endemic to Madagascar.
