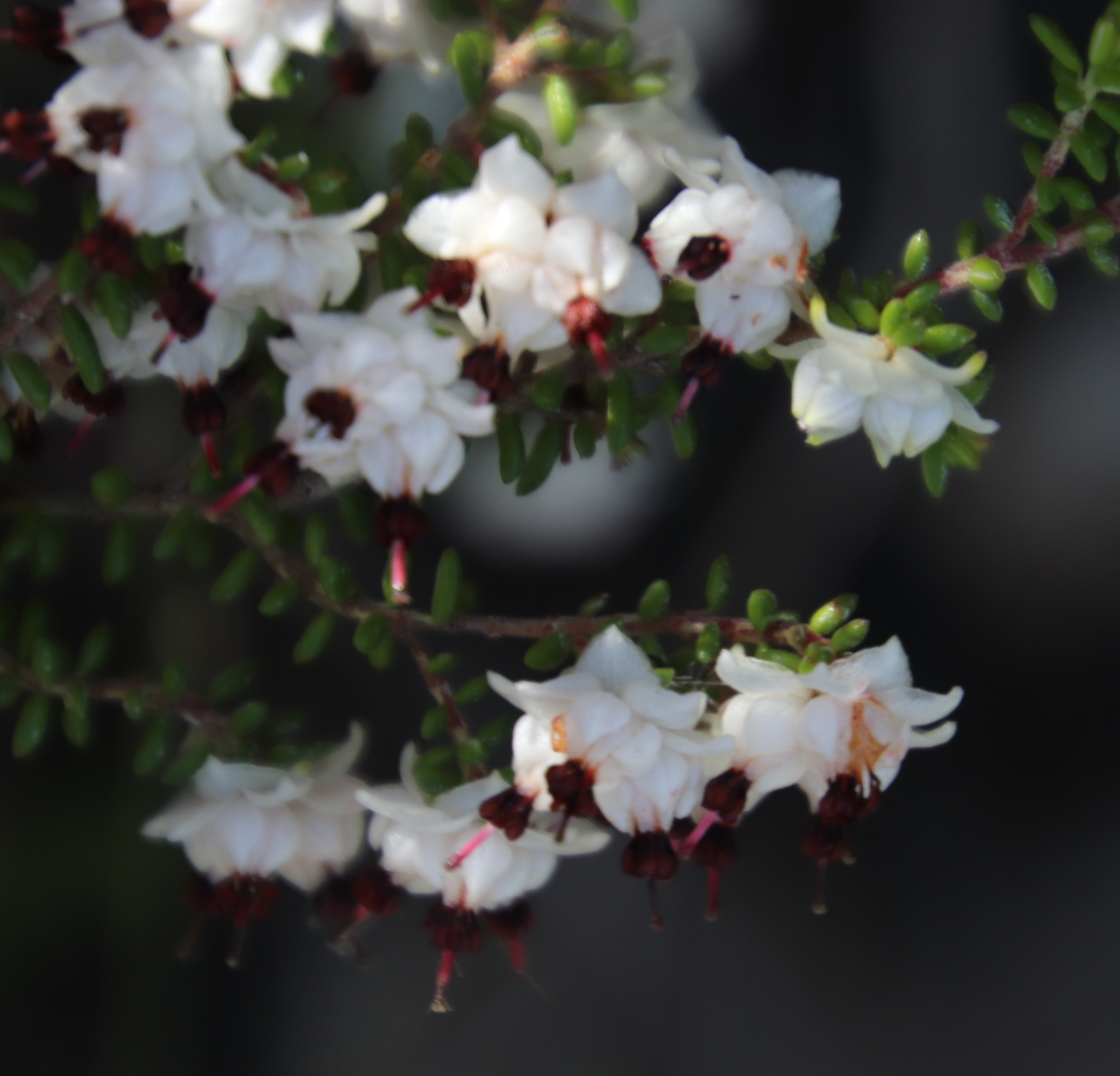

Scientific classification
- Kingdom: Plantae
- Clade: Tracheophytes
- Clade: Angiosperms
- Clade: Eudicots
- Clade: Asterids
- Order: Ericales
- Family: Ericaceae
- Genus: Erica
- Species: E. azaleifolia

Binomial name
- Erica azaleifolia Salisb.

Synonyms
- Ericoides azaleifolium (Salisb.) Kuntze; Eurylepis azaleiflora Steud.; Eurylepis azaleifolia G.Don

= Erica azaleifolia =

Species of flowering plant

Erica azaleifolia, the nipped heath, is a plant belonging to the genus Erica and forming part of the fynbos. The species is endemic to the Western Cape.
