= Erica utriculosa =

Scientific classification
- Kingdom: Plantae
- Clade: Tracheophytes
- Clade: Angiosperms
- Clade: Eudicots
- Clade: Asterids
- Order: Ericales
- Family: Ericaceae
- Genus: Erica
- Species: E. utriculosa

Binomial name
- Erica utriculosa L.Bolus, (1924)

Species of flowering plant

Erica utriculosa is a plant belonging to the genus Erica and is part of the fynbos. The species is endemic to the Western Cape and occurs from the Cape Peninsula to the Akkedisberg.
