= Erica obtusata =

Scientific classification
- Kingdom: Plantae
- Clade: Tracheophytes
- Clade: Angiosperms
- Clade: Eudicots
- Clade: Asterids
- Order: Ericales
- Family: Ericaceae
- Genus: Erica
- Species: E. obtusata

Binomial name
- Erica obtusata Klotzsch ex Benth., (1839)

Synonyms
- Ericoides obtusatum (Klotzsch ex Benth.) Kuntze

Species of flowering plant

Erica obtusata is a plant belonging to the genus Erica and is part of the fynbos. The species is endemic to Western Cape, South Africa.
