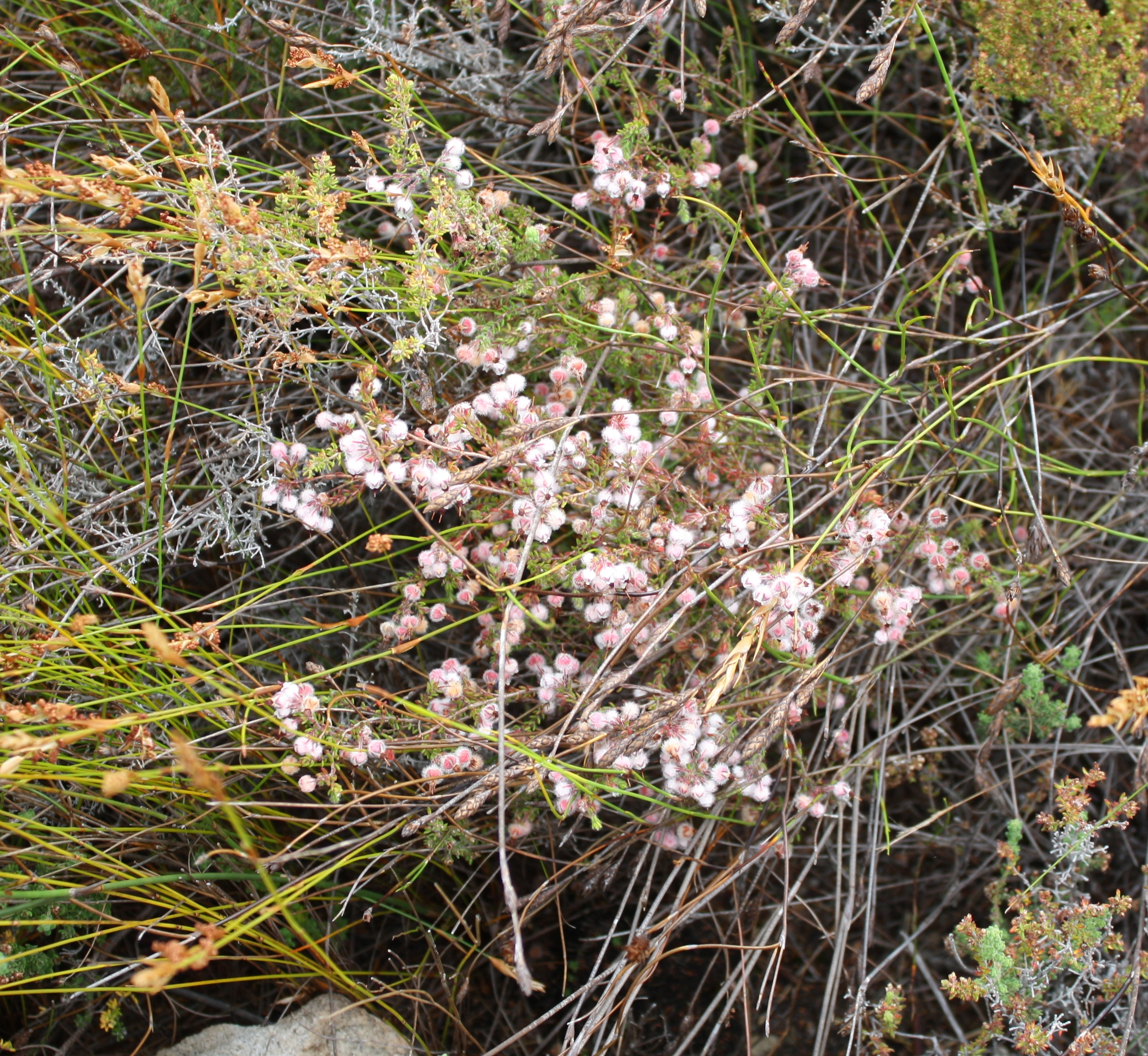

Scientific classification
- Kingdom: Plantae
- Clade: Tracheophytes
- Clade: Angiosperms
- Clade: Eudicots
- Clade: Asterids
- Order: Ericales
- Family: Ericaceae
- Genus: Erica
- Species: E. bruniades

Binomial name
- Erica bruniades L., (1753)

Synonyms
- Ectasis bruniades (L.) D.Don; Ectasis velleriflora (Salisb.) G.Don; Erica capitata Thunb.; Erica carbasina Salisb.; Erica eriantha Klotzsch ex Benth.; Erica lasiocephala Klotzsch ex Benth.; Erica velleriflora Salisb.; Erica villosa Andrews; Ericoides bruniades (L.) Kuntze

= Erica bruniades =

Kapok Heath

Species of flowering plant

Erica bruniades, the kapok heath, is a flowering plant in the genus Erica, part of the fynbos. The species is endemic to the Western Cape in South Africa.
