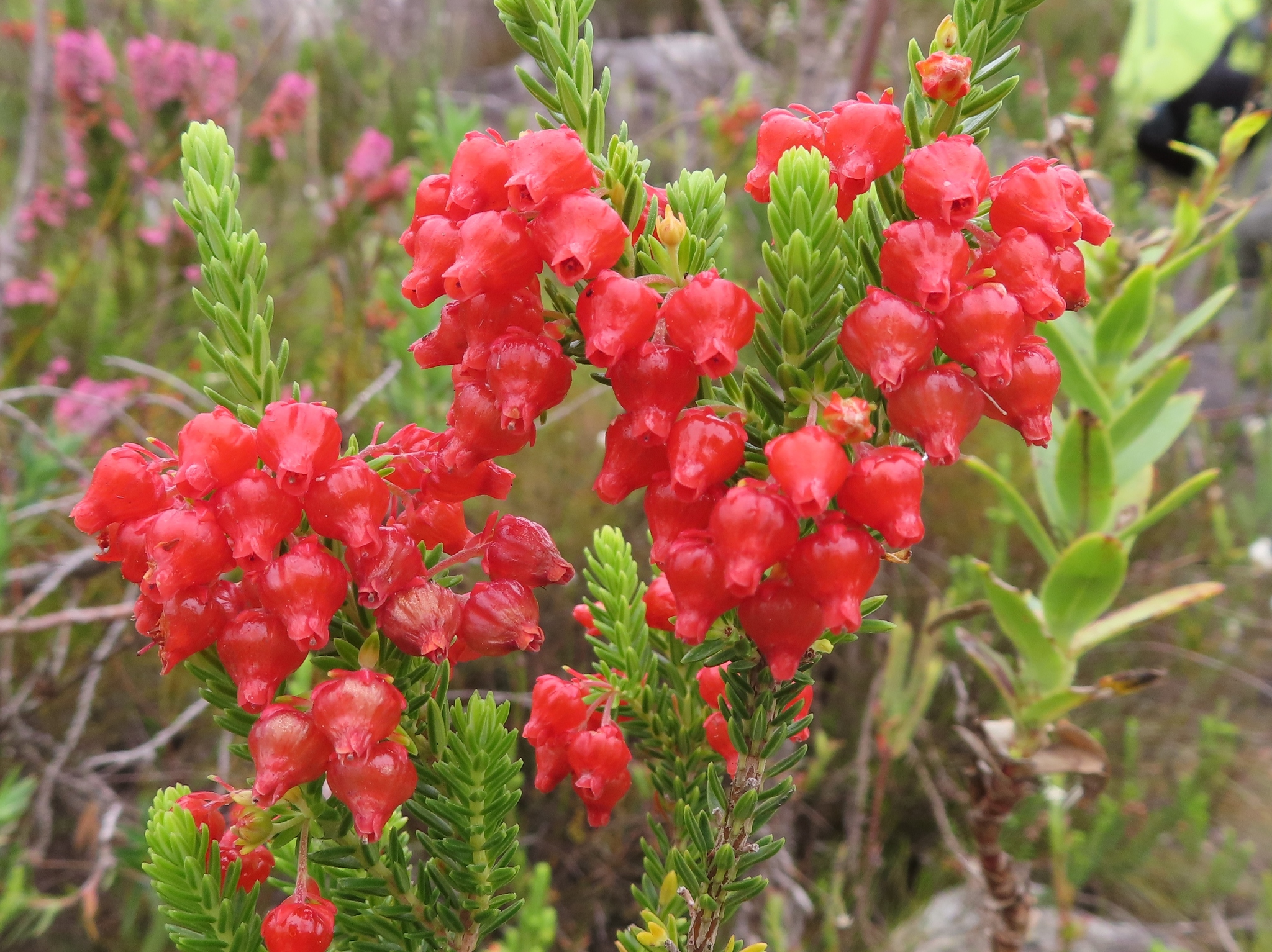

Scientific classification
- Kingdom: Plantae
- Clade: Tracheophytes
- Clade: Angiosperms
- Clade: Eudicots
- Clade: Asterids
- Order: Ericales
- Family: Ericaceae
- Genus: Erica
- Species: E. ardens

Binomial name
- Erica ardens Andrews

Synonyms
- Ericoides ardens (Andrews) Kuntze; Pachysa ardens D.Don

= Erica ardens =

Species of flowering plant

Erica ardens, the glowing heath, is a plant belonging to the genus Erica and forming part of the fynbos. The species is endemic to the Western Cape.
