= Erica conferta =

Scientific classification
- Kingdom: Plantae
- Clade: Tracheophytes
- Clade: Angiosperms
- Clade: Eudicots
- Clade: Asterids
- Order: Ericales
- Family: Ericaceae
- Genus: Erica
- Species: E. conferta

Binomial name
- Erica conferta Andrews

Synonyms
- Desmia conferta D.Don; Ericoides confertum (Andrews) Kuntze

Species of flowering plant

Erica conferta is a plant that belongs to the genus Erica and forms part of the fynbos. The species is endemic to the Western Cape.
