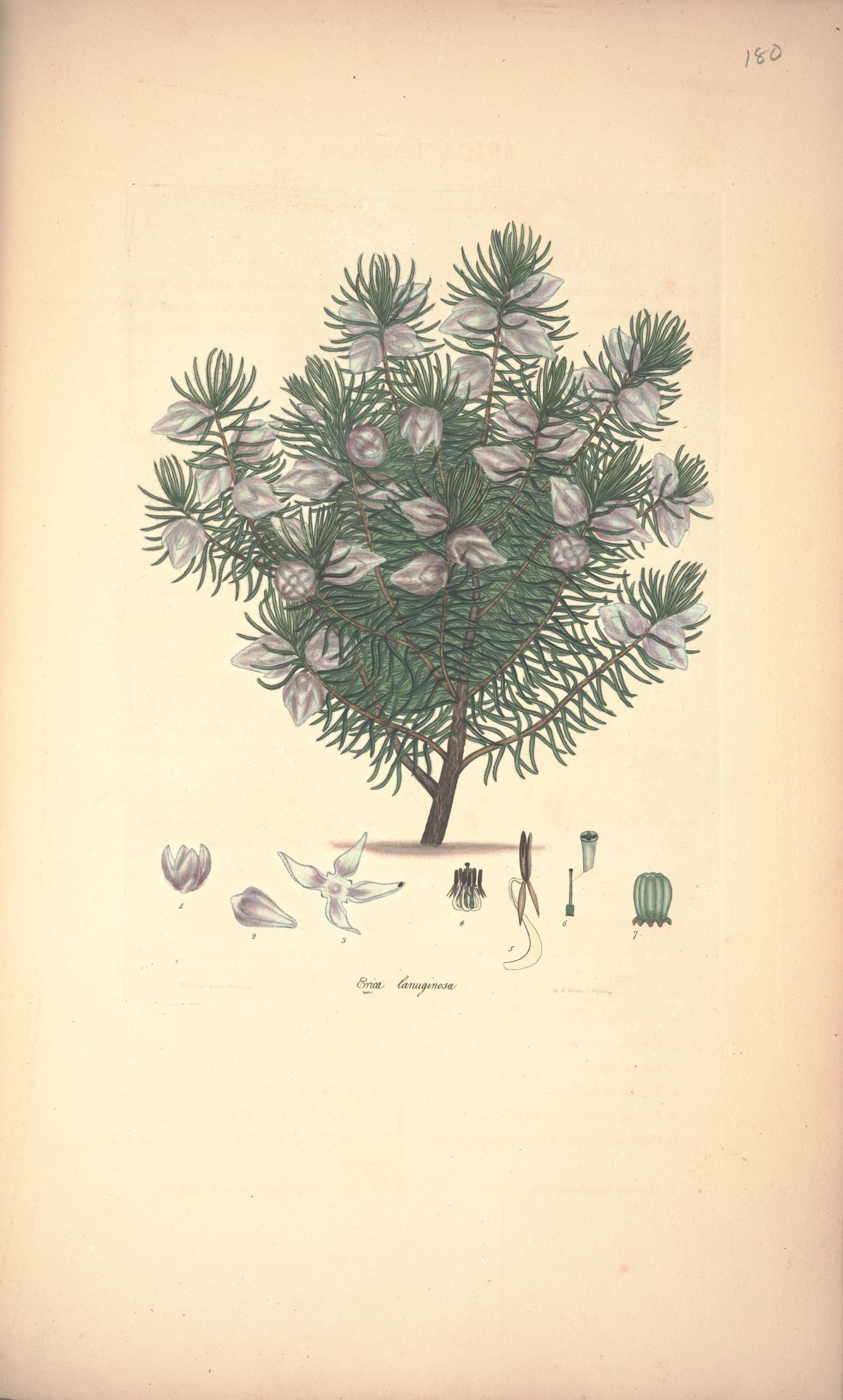

Scientific classification
- Kingdom: Plantae
- Clade: Tracheophytes
- Clade: Angiosperms
- Clade: Eudicots
- Clade: Asterids
- Order: Ericales
- Family: Ericaceae
- Genus: Erica
- Species: E. lanuginosa

Binomial name
- Erica lanuginosa Andrews

Synonyms
- Erica fuscata F.Dietr. ex Steud.; Ericoides lanuginosum (Andrews) Kuntze; Eurystegia lanuginosa G.Don

= Erica lanuginosa =

Species of flowering plant

Erica lanuginosa is a plant belonging to the genus Erica and is part of the fynbos. The species is endemic to the Western Cape.
