= Erica mafiensis =

Conservation status
- Vulnerable (IUCN 3.1)

Scientific classification
- Kingdom: Plantae
- Clade: Tracheophytes
- Clade: Angiosperms
- Clade: Eudicots
- Clade: Asterids
- Order: Ericales
- Family: Ericaceae
- Genus: Erica
- Species: E. mafiensis

Binomial name
- Erica mafiensis (Engl.) Dorr, (1994)

Synonyms
- Philippia mafiensis Engl.

Species of flowering plant

Erica mafiensis is a plant belonging to the genus Erica. The species is endemic to Tanzania.
