= Erica armata =

Scientific classification
- Kingdom: Plantae
- Clade: Tracheophytes
- Clade: Angiosperms
- Clade: Eudicots
- Clade: Asterids
- Order: Ericales
- Family: Ericaceae
- Genus: Erica
- Species: E. armata

Binomial name
- Erica armata Klotzsch ex Benth.

Synonyms
- Erica umbrosa H.A.Baker; Ericoides armatum (Klotzsch ex Benth.) Kuntze

Species of flowering plant

Erica armata is a plant belonging to the genus Erica and forming part of the fynbos. The species is endemic to the Western Cape.
