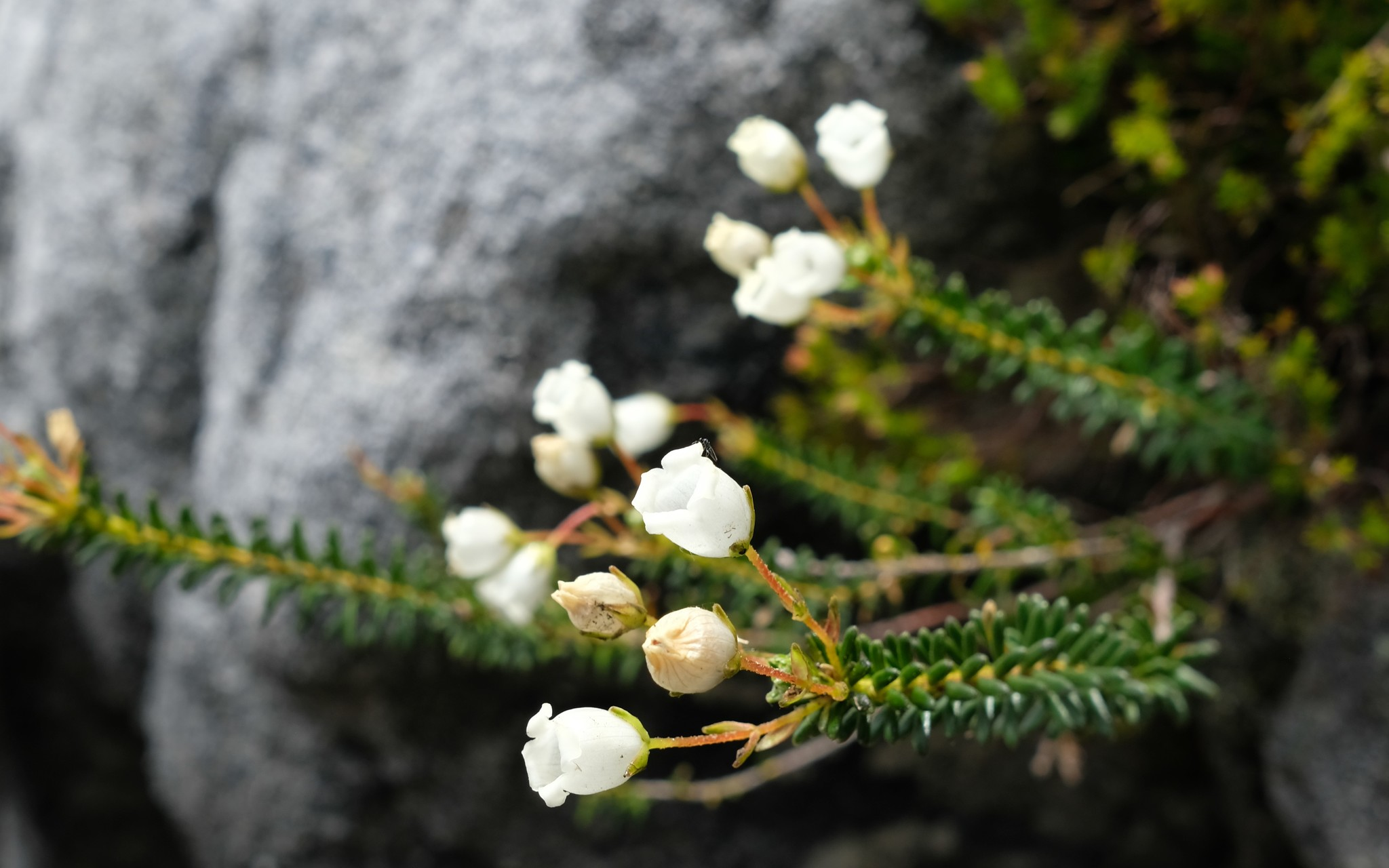

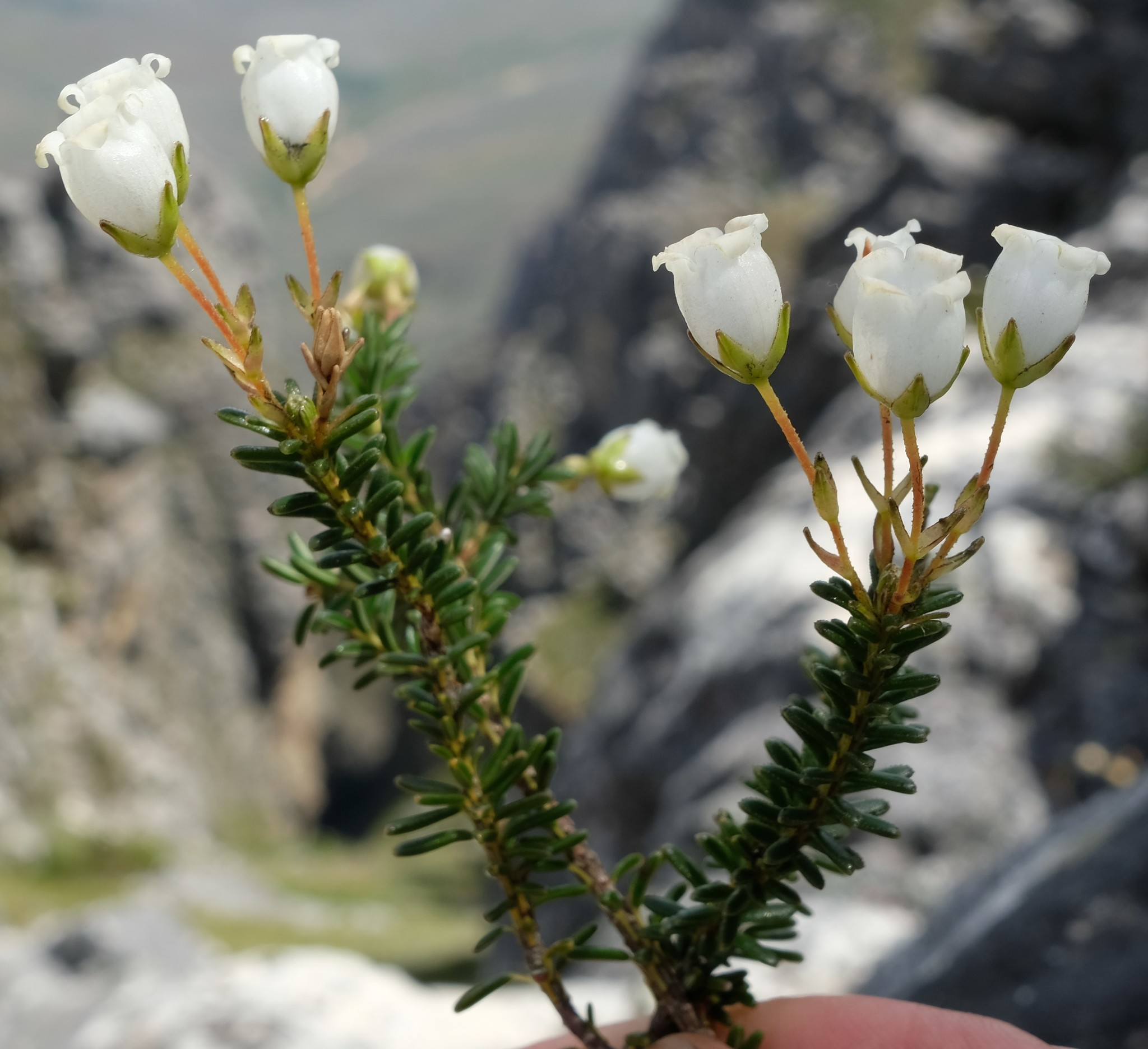

Scientific classification
- Kingdom: Plantae
- Clade: Tracheophytes
- Clade: Angiosperms
- Clade: Eudicots
- Clade: Asterids
- Order: Ericales
- Family: Ericaceae
- Genus: Erica
- Species: E. odorata

Binomial name
- Erica odorata Andrews

Synonyms
- Erica adenophylla Bolus; Erica beaumontia Andrews; Erica beaumontiana Rollison ex G.Lodd.; Erica spirans Hoffmanns.; Ericoides odoratum (Andrews) Kuntze

= Erica odorata =

Species of flowering plant

Erica odorata is a plant belonging to the genus Erica and is part of the fynbos. The species is endemic to the Western Cape.
