= Disa vasselotii =

Scientific classification
- Kingdom: Plantae
- Clade: Tracheophytes
- Clade: Angiosperms
- Clade: Monocots
- Order: Asparagales
- Family: Orchidaceae
- Subfamily: Orchidoideae
- Genus: Disa
- Species: D. vasselotii

Binomial name
- Disa vasselotii Bolus ex Schltr.

Species of flowering plant

Disa vasselotii is a perennial plant and geophyte belonging to the genus Disa and is part of the fynbos. The plant is endemic to the Eastern and Western Cape.
