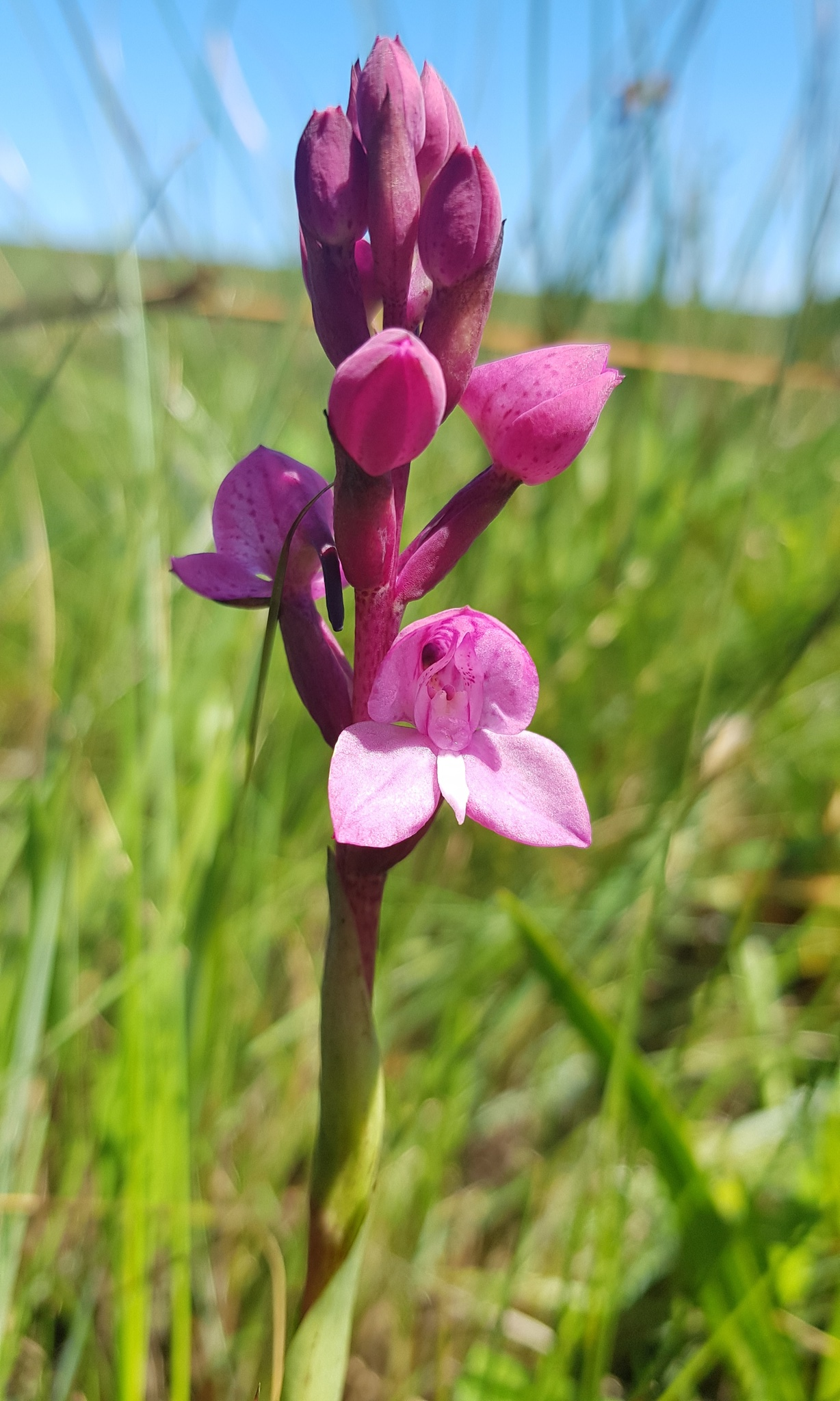

Scientific classification
- Kingdom: Plantae
- Clade: Tracheophytes
- Clade: Angiosperms
- Clade: Monocots
- Order: Asparagales
- Family: Orchidaceae
- Subfamily: Orchidoideae
- Genus: Disa
- Species: D. afra

Binomial name
- Disa afra Bolus

Synonyms
- Disa compta Summerh.; Disa perrieri Schltr.; Disa caffra Bolus

= Disa afra =

Species of flowering plant

Disa afra is a perennial plant and geophyte belonging to the genus Disa. In South Africa, the plant occurs in KwaZulu-Natal and the Eastern Cape. It is also native to Angola, the Democratic Republic of the Congo, Madagascar, Malawi, Tanzania and Zambia.
