= Erica distorta =

Scientific classification
- Kingdom: Plantae
- Clade: Tracheophytes
- Clade: Angiosperms
- Clade: Eudicots
- Clade: Asterids
- Order: Ericales
- Family: Ericaceae
- Genus: Erica
- Species: E. distorta

Binomial name
- Erica distorta Bartl.

Synonyms
- Erica aemula Guthrie & Bolus; Erica murina Klotzsch ex Benth.; Ericoides distortum (Bartl.) Kuntze

Species of flowering plant

Erica distorta is a plant belonging to the genus Erica and forming part of the fynbos. The species is endemic to the Western Cape.
