= Erica schlechteri =

Scientific classification
- Kingdom: Plantae
- Clade: Tracheophytes
- Clade: Angiosperms
- Clade: Eudicots
- Clade: Asterids
- Order: Ericales
- Family: Ericaceae
- Genus: Erica
- Species: E. schlechteri

Binomial name
- Erica schlechteri Bolus

Species of flowering plant

Erica schlechteri is a plant belonging to the genus Erica. The species is native to KwaZulu-Natal, Lesotho, the Eastern Cape and the Free State.
