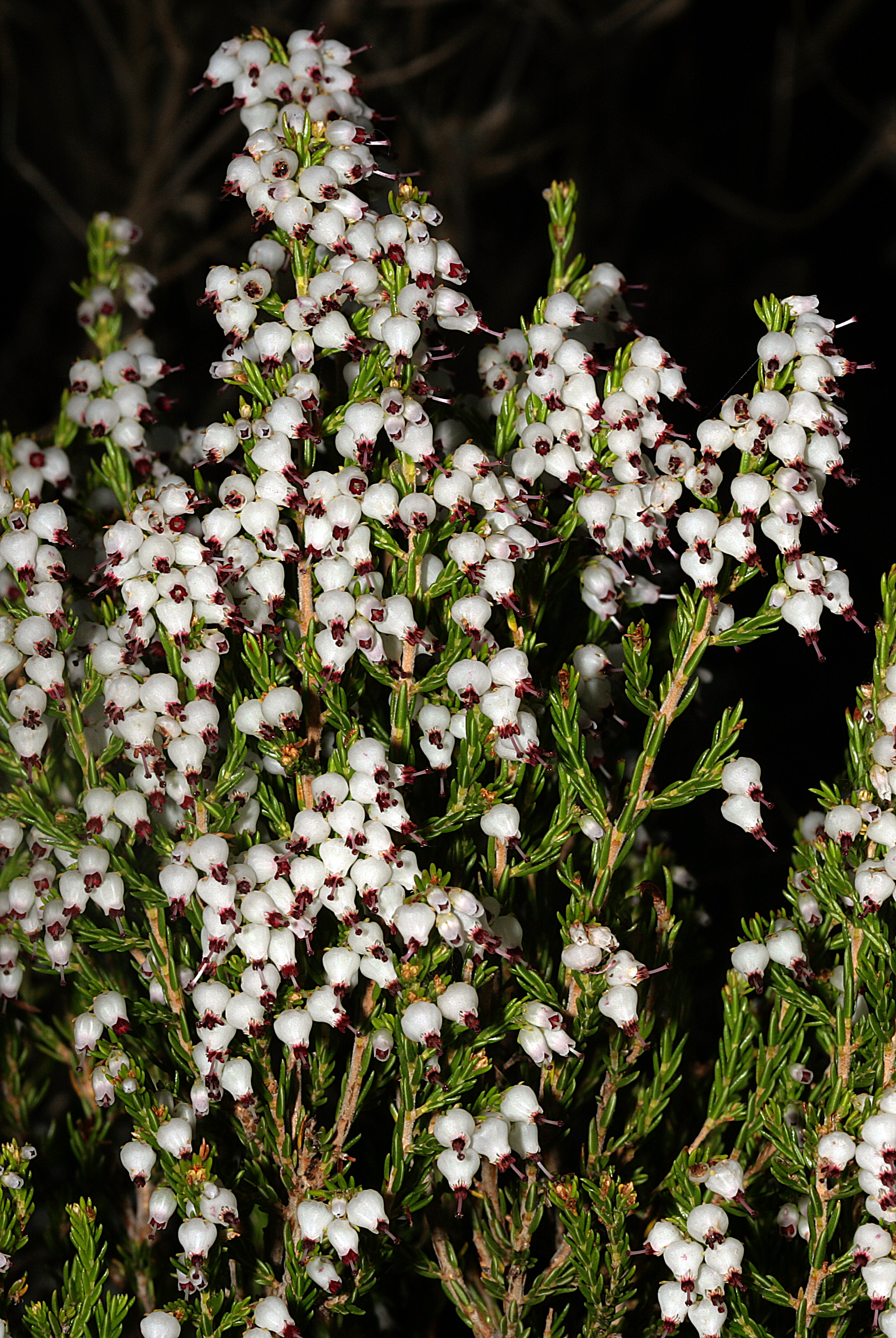

Scientific classification
- Kingdom: Plantae
- Clade: Tracheophytes
- Clade: Angiosperms
- Clade: Eudicots
- Clade: Asterids
- Order: Ericales
- Family: Ericaceae
- Genus: Erica
- Species: E. drakensbergensis

Binomial name
- Erica drakensbergensis Guthrie & Bolus, (1905)

= Erica drakensbergensis =

Species of flowering plant

Erica drakensbergensis, the Drakensberg heath, is a plant belonging to the genus Erica. The species is native to South Africa and Eswatini. In South Africa, the plant occurs in Gauteng, KwaZulu-Natal, Mpumalanga and the Free State.
