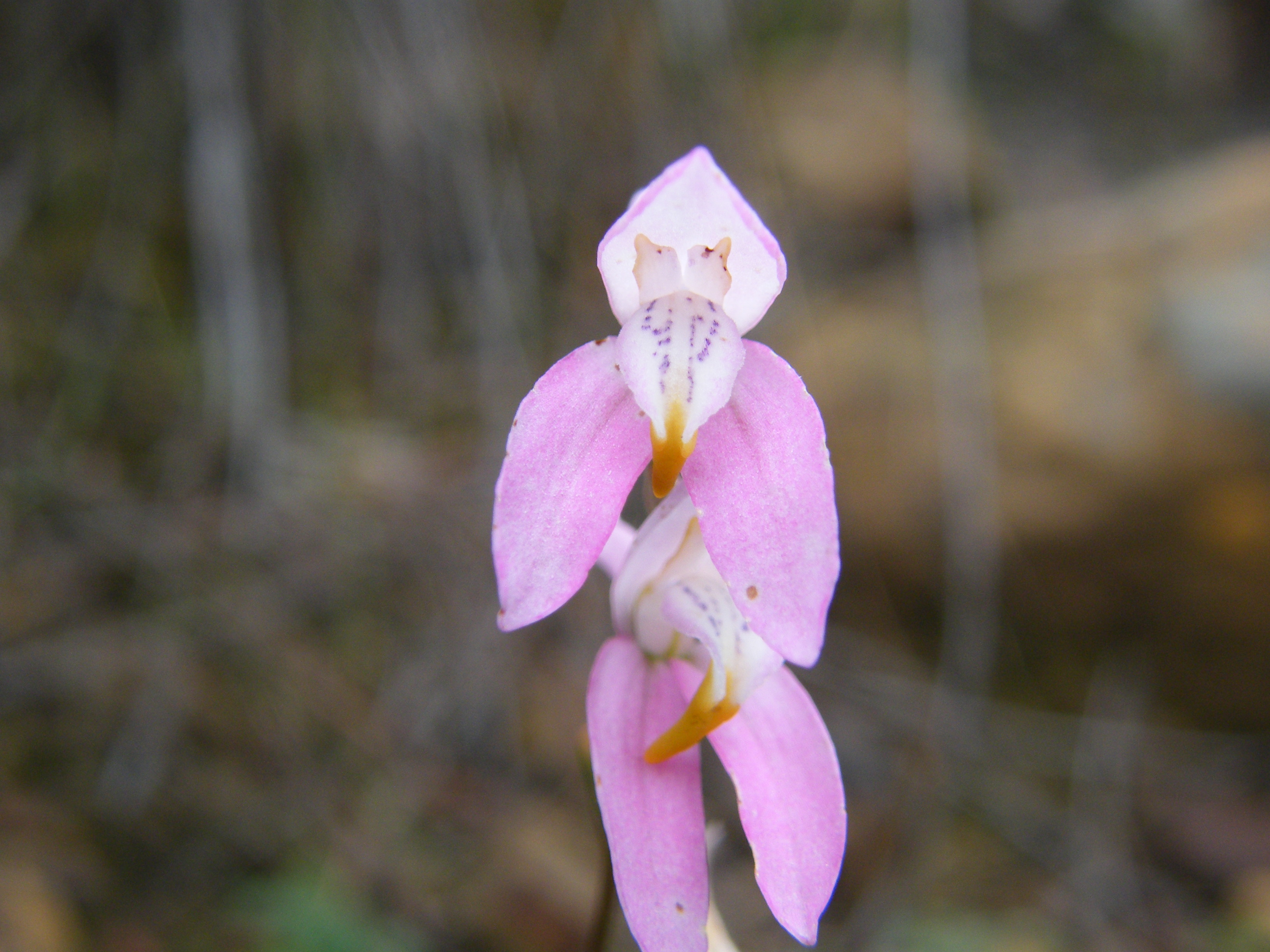

Scientific classification
- Kingdom: Plantae
- Clade: Tracheophytes
- Clade: Angiosperms
- Clade: Monocots
- Order: Asparagales
- Family: Orchidaceae
- Subfamily: Orchidoideae
- Genus: Disa
- Species: D. obliqua

Binomial name
- Disa obliqua (Lindl.) Bolus

Synonyms
- Schizodium obliquum Lindl.

= Disa obliqua =

Species of flowering plant

Disa obliqua is a perennial plant and geophyte belonging to the genus Disa and is part of the fynbos. The plant is endemic to the Western Cape.

There are two subspecies:

- Disa obliqua subsp. clavigera (Lindl.) Bytebier
- Disa obliqua subsp. obliqua
