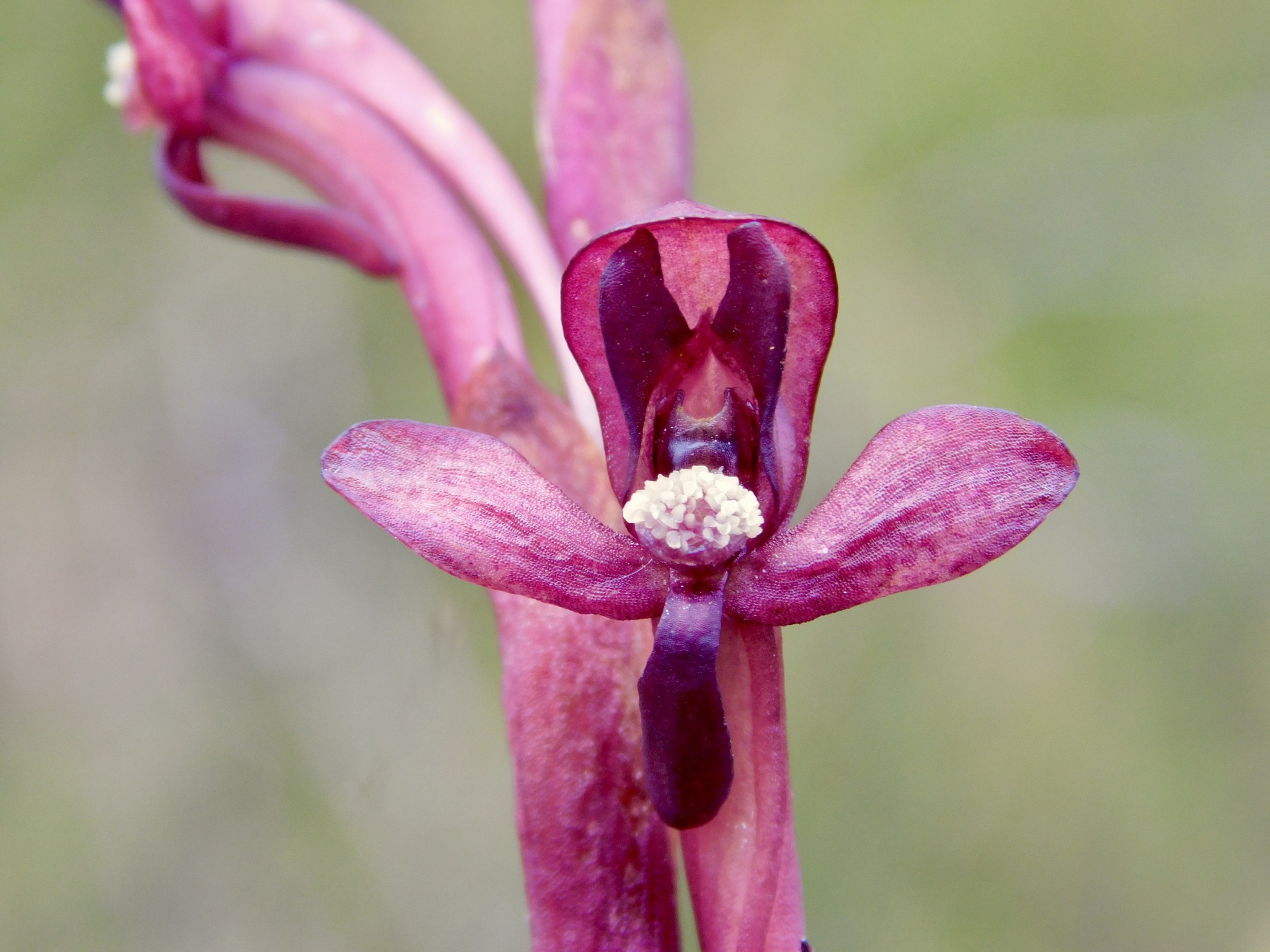

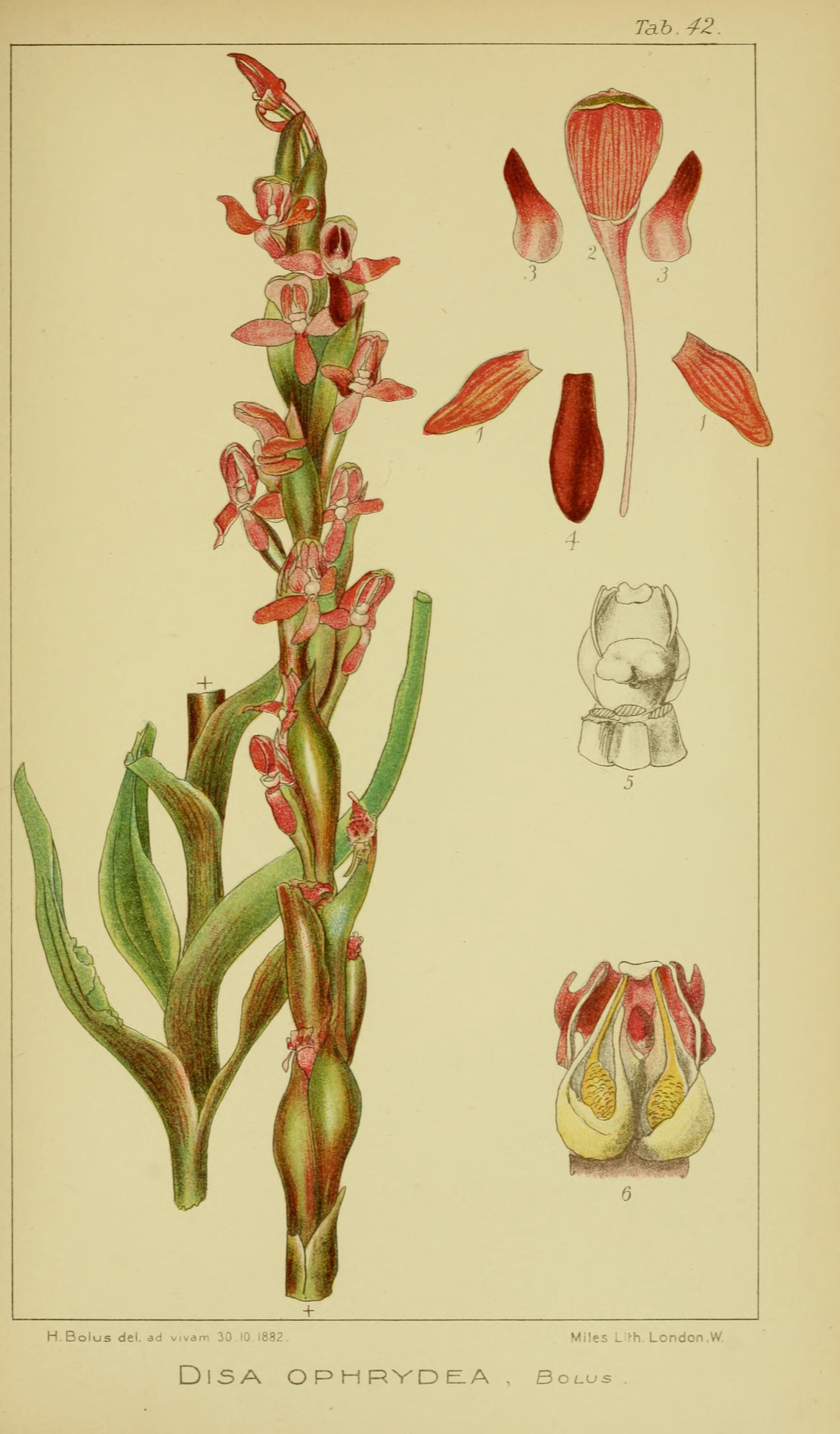

Scientific classification
- Kingdom: Plantae
- Clade: Tracheophytes
- Clade: Angiosperms
- Clade: Monocots
- Order: Asparagales
- Family: Orchidaceae
- Subfamily: Orchidoideae
- Genus: Disa
- Species: D. ophrydea

Binomial name
- Disa ophrydea (Lindl.) Bolus

Synonyms
- Brownleea pentheriana Kraenzl. ex Zahlbr.; Disa sonderiana Schltr. ex Kraenzl.; Monadenia ophrydea Lindl.

= Disa ophrydea =

Species of flowering plant

Disa ophrydea, commonly known as the beetroot monadisa, is a perennial plant and geophyte belonging to the genus Disa and is part of the fynbos. The plant is endemic to the Eastern and Western Cape.
