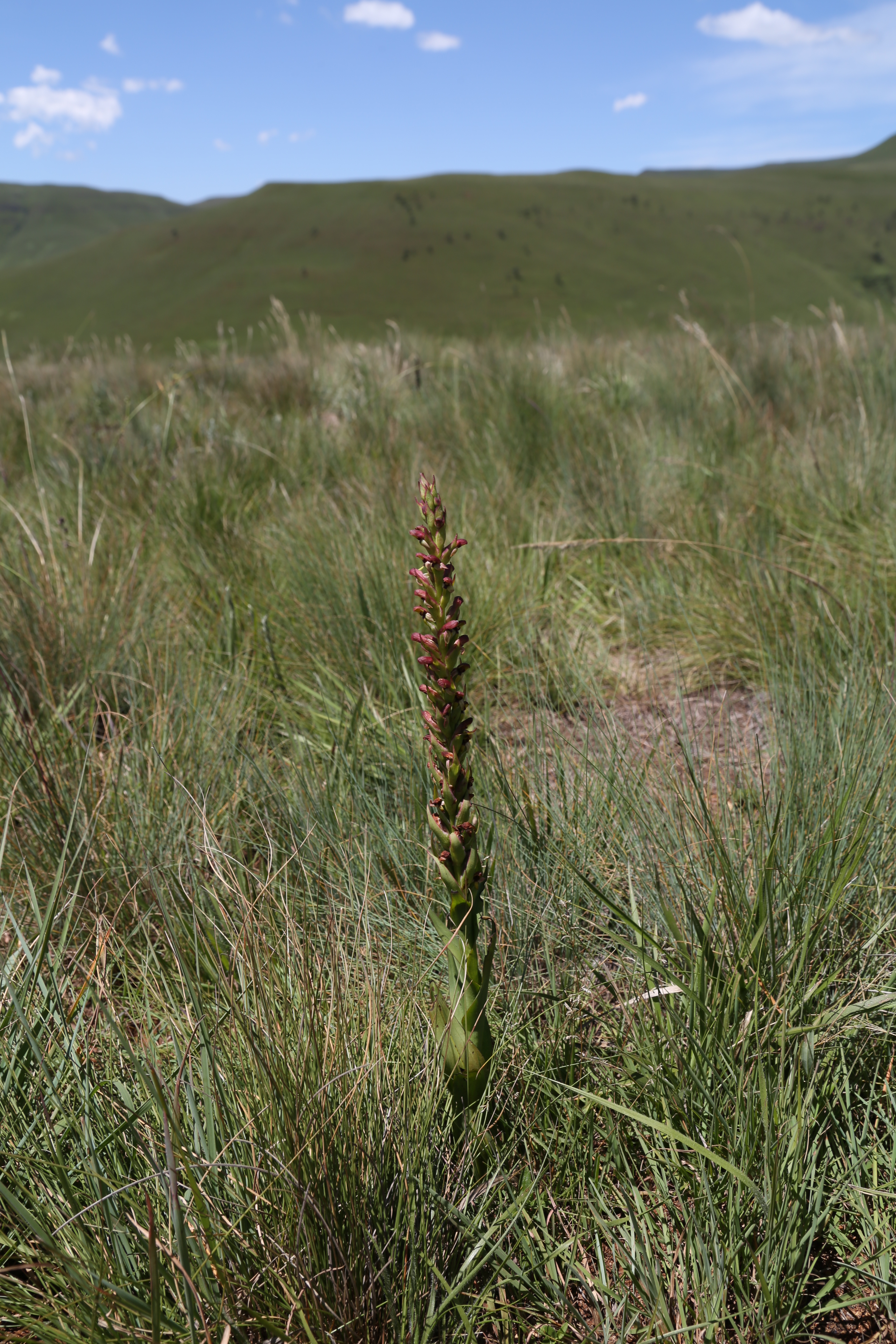

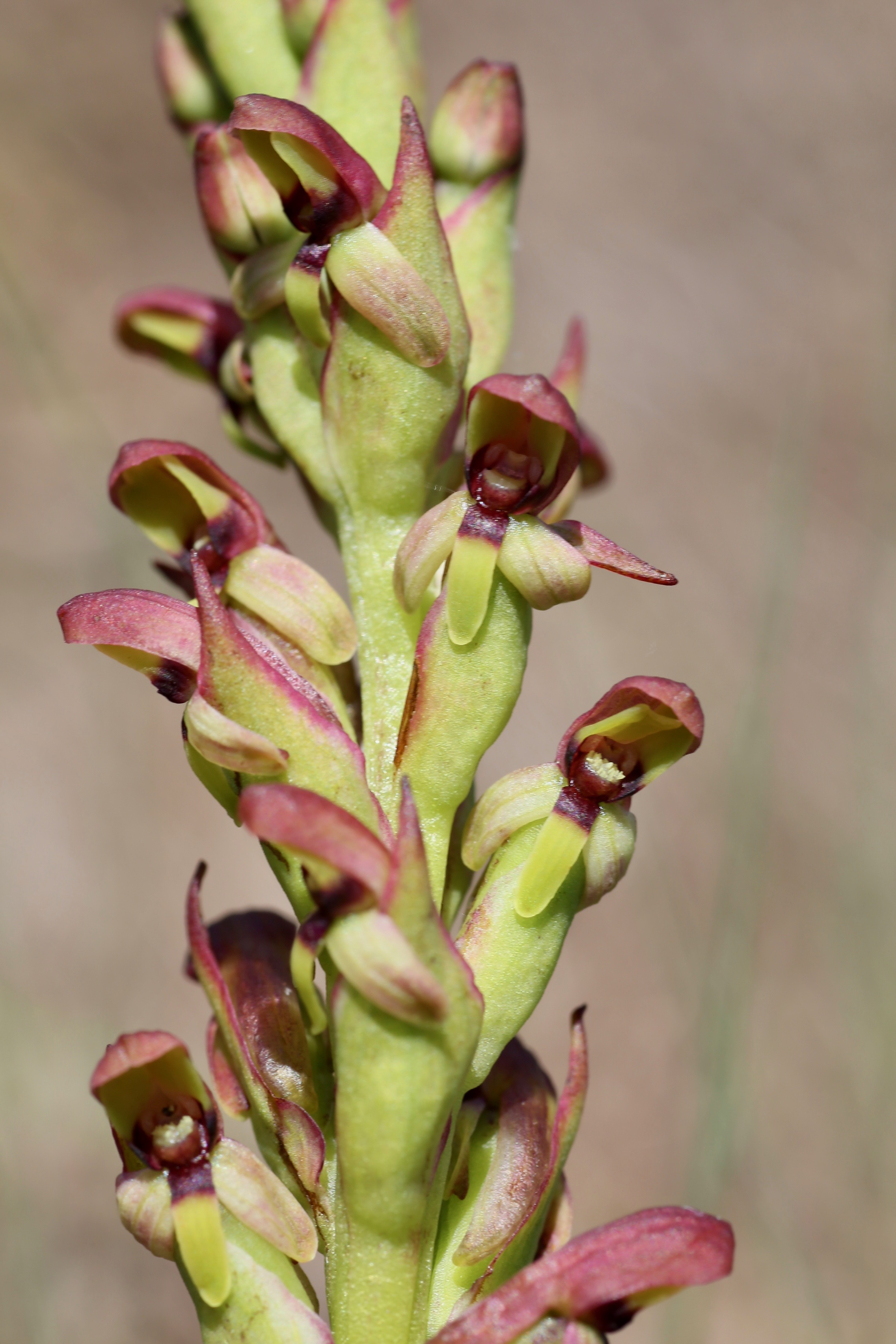

Scientific classification
- Kingdom: Plantae
- Clade: Tracheophytes
- Clade: Angiosperms
- Clade: Monocots
- Order: Asparagales
- Family: Orchidaceae
- Subfamily: Orchidoideae
- Genus: Disa
- Species: D. brevicornis

Binomial name
- Disa brevicornis (Lindl.) Bolus

Synonyms
- Monadenia brevicornis Lindl.

= Disa brevicornis =

Species of flowering plant

Disa brevicornis is a perennial plant and geophyte belonging to the genus Disa. In South Africa, the species is native to KwaZulu-Natal, Limpopo, Mpumalanga, Eastern Cape, Free State and Western Cape. It is also native to Lesotho, Madagascar, Malawi and Zimbabwe.
