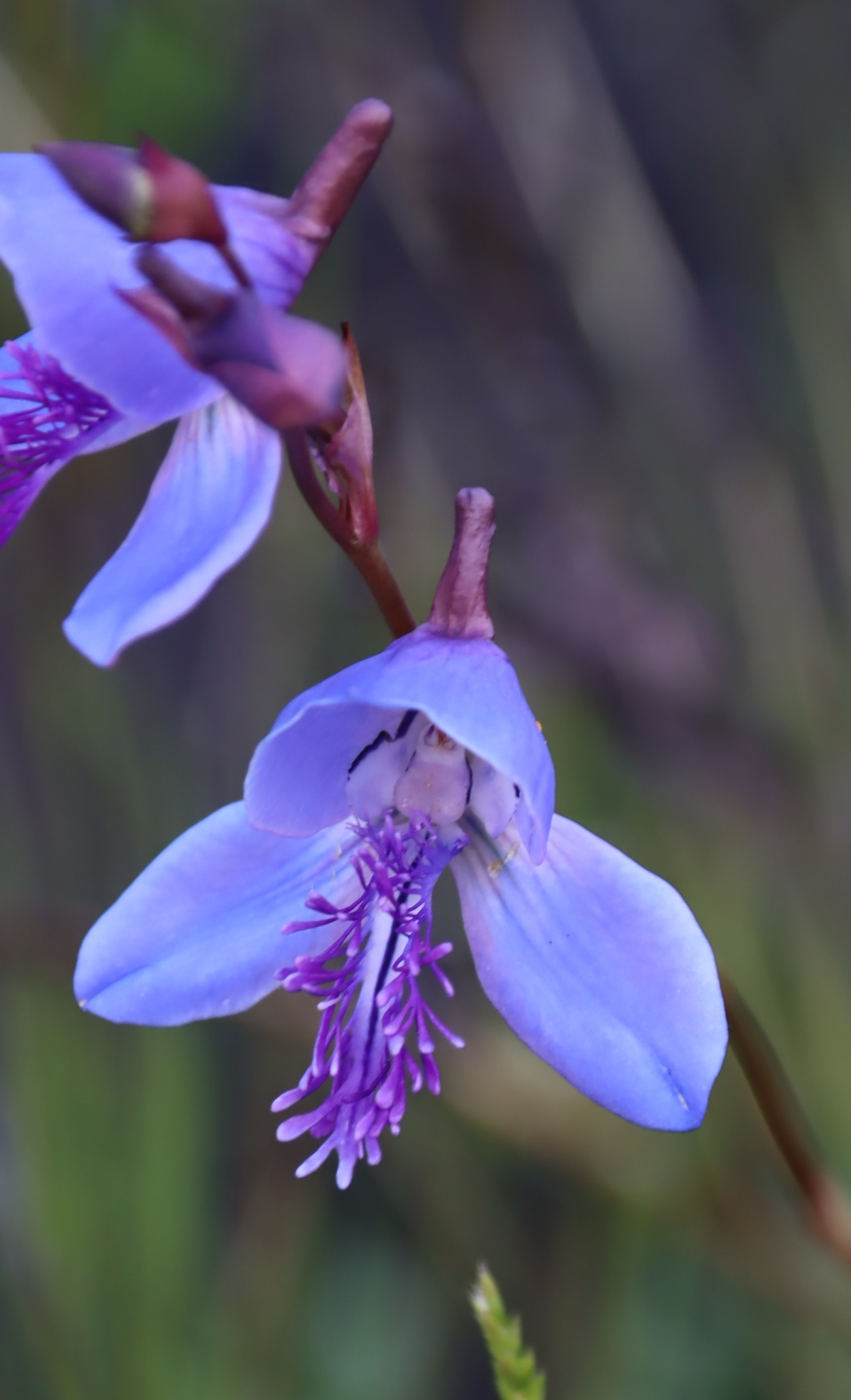

Scientific classification
- Kingdom: Plantae
- Clade: Embryophytes
- Clade: Tracheophytes
- Clade: Spermatophytes
- Clade: Angiosperms
- Clade: Monocots
- Order: Asparagales
- Family: Orchidaceae
- Subfamily: Orchidoideae
- Genus: Disa
- Species: D. baurii

Binomial name
- Disa baurii Bolus

Synonyms
- Disa hamatopetala Rendle; Herschelia bachmanniana Kraenzl.; Herschelia baurii (Bolus) Kraenzl.; Herschelia hamatopetala (Rendle) Kraenzl.; Herschelianthe bachmanniana (Kraenzl.) Rauschert; Herschelianthe baurii (Bolus) Rauschert; Herschelianthe hamatopetala (Rendle) Rauschert

= Disa baurii =

Species of flowering plant in the orchid family

Disa baurii is a perennial plant and geophyte belonging to the genus Disa. In South Africa, the plant is native to KwaZulu-Natal, Eastern Cape, Limpopo and Mpumalanga. It also occurs in Burundi, Democratic Republic of the Congo, Eswatini, Malawi, Mozambique, Rwanda, Tanzania, Zambia and Zimbabwe.
