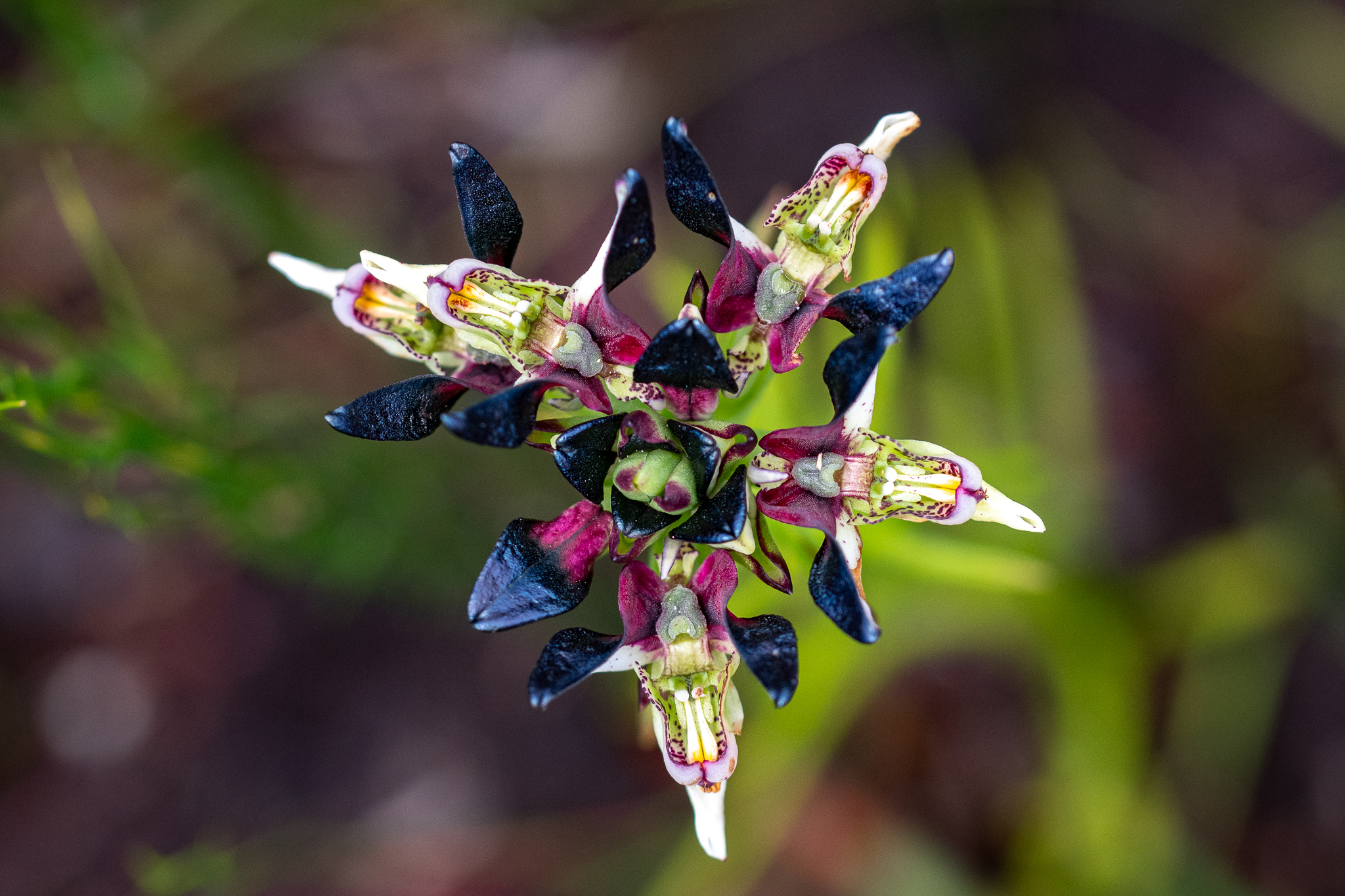

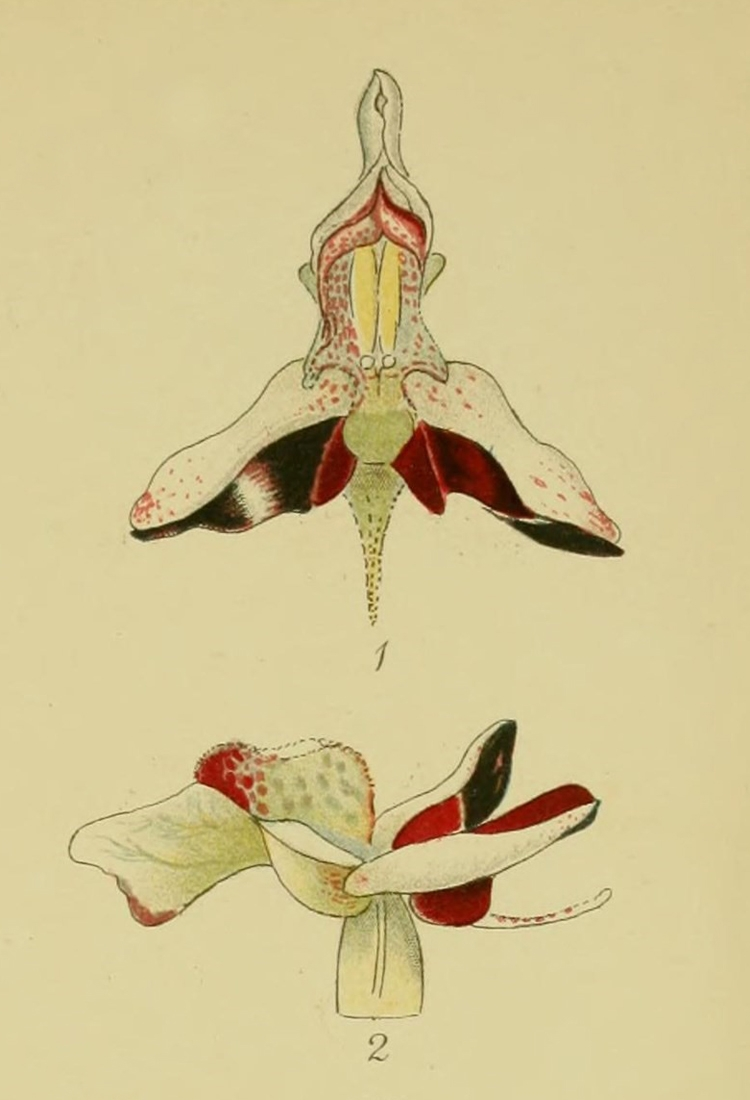

Scientific classification
- Kingdom: Plantae
- Clade: Tracheophytes
- Clade: Angiosperms
- Clade: Monocots
- Order: Asparagales
- Family: Orchidaceae
- Subfamily: Orchidoideae
- Genus: Disa
- Species: D. atricapilla

Binomial name
- Disa atricapilla (Harv. ex Lindl.) Bolus

Synonyms
- Disa bivalvata var. atricapilla (Harv. ex Lindl.) Schltr.; Orthopenthea atricapilla (Harv. ex Lindl.) Rolfe; Penthea atricapilla Harv. ex Lindl.

= Disa atricapilla =

Species of flowering plant

Disa atricapilla, the black-haired orchid, is a perennial plant and geophyte belonging to the genus Disa and is part of the fynbos. The plant grows up to 30 cm tall. The species is endemic to the Western Cape and occurs in the southwest. The plant flowers in November and December, usually after wildfires. The flowers are bicoloured.
