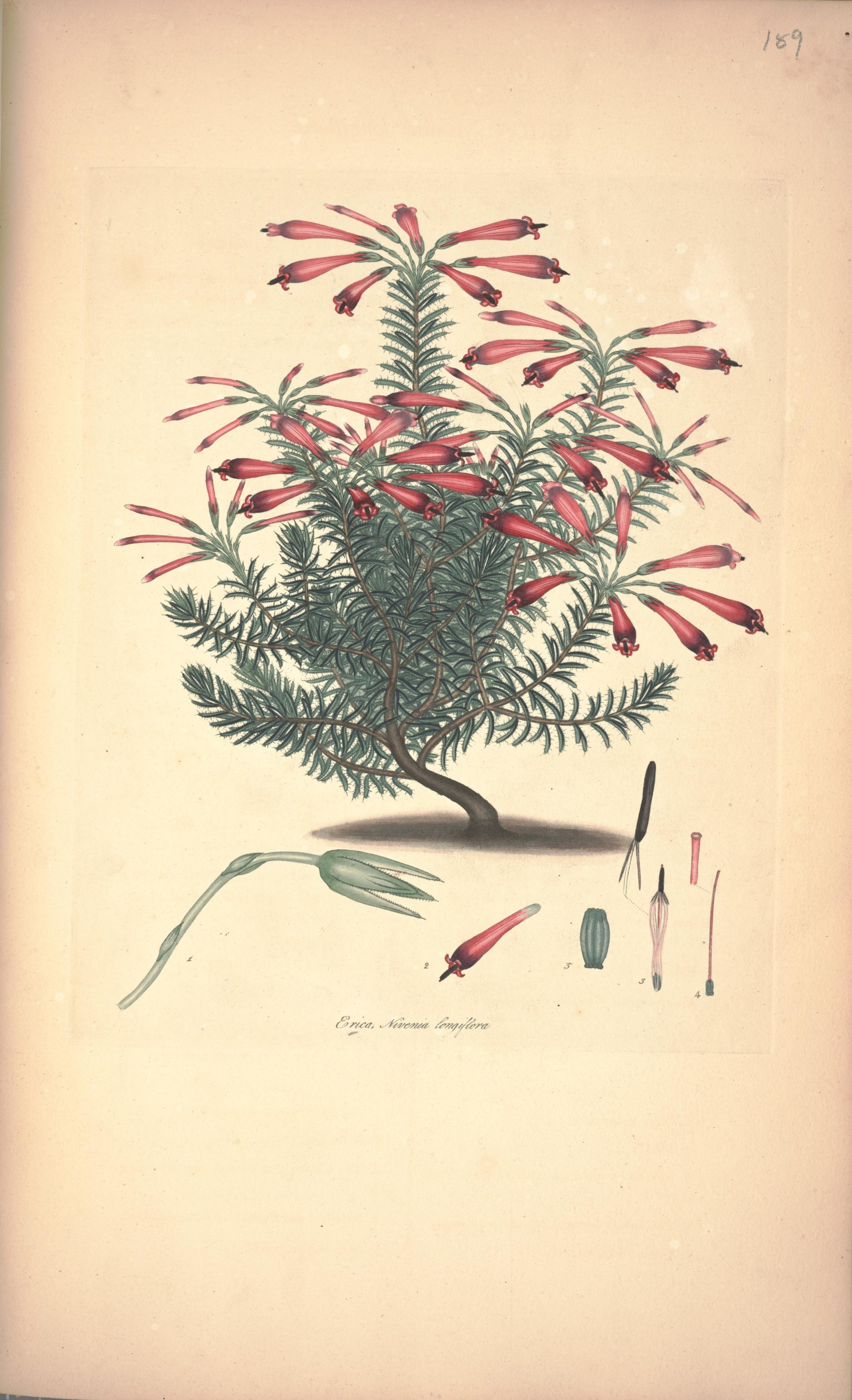

Scientific classification
- Kingdom: Plantae
- Clade: Tracheophytes
- Clade: Angiosperms
- Clade: Eudicots
- Clade: Asterids
- Order: Ericales
- Family: Ericaceae
- Genus: Erica
- Species: E. embothriifolia

Binomial name
- Erica embothriifolia Salisb.

= Erica embothriifolia =

Species of flowering plant

Erica embothriifolia is a plant belonging to the genus Erica and forming part of the fynbos. The species is endemic to the Western Cape.

The species has three varieties:

- Erica embothriifolia var. embothriifolia
- Erica embothriifolia var. longiflora (Andrews) Bolus
- Erica embothriifolia var. subaequalis Bolus
