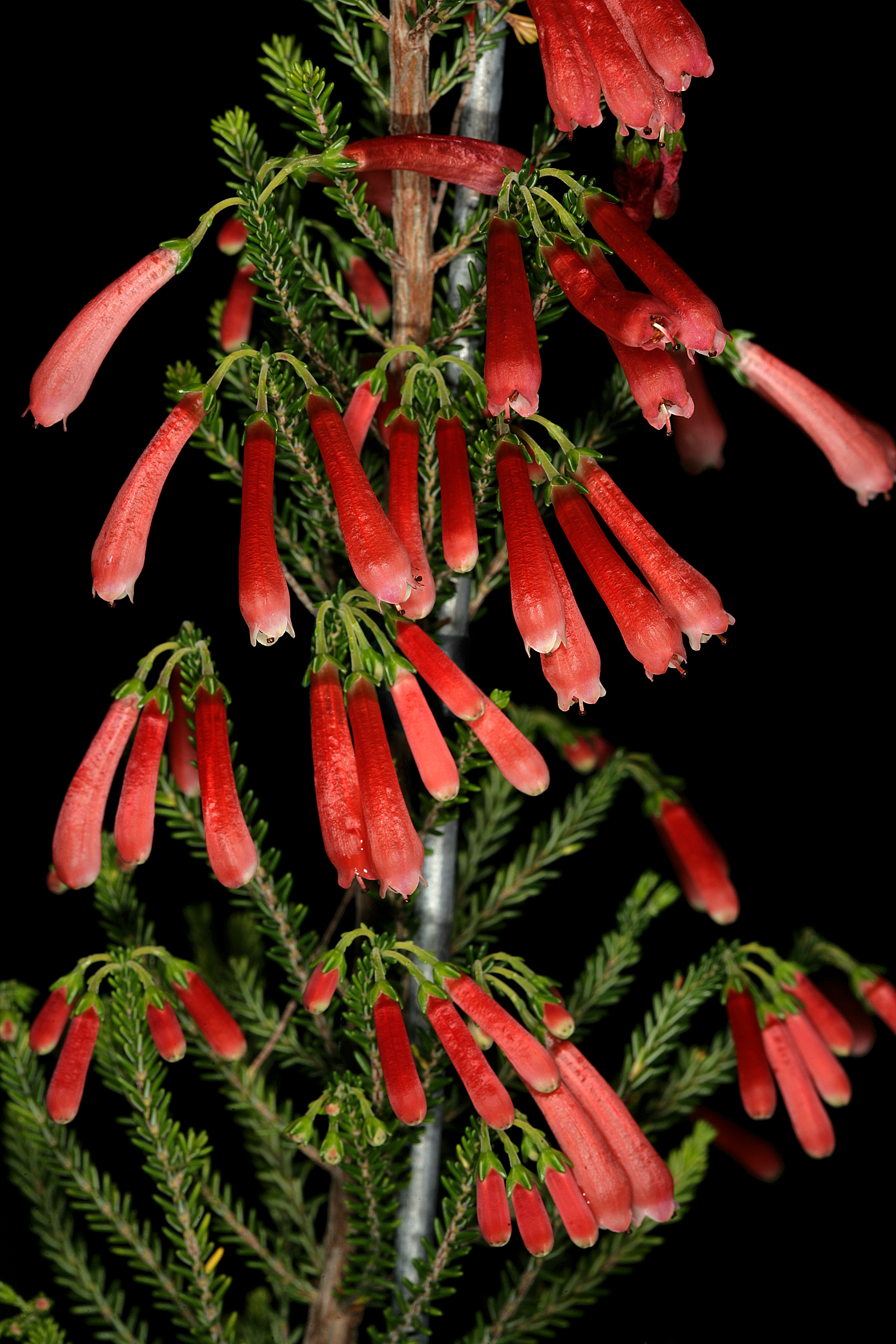

Scientific classification
- Kingdom: Plantae
- Clade: Tracheophytes
- Clade: Angiosperms
- Clade: Eudicots
- Clade: Asterids
- Order: Ericales
- Family: Ericaceae
- Genus: Erica
- Species: E. haematosiphon

Binomial name
- Erica haematosiphon Guthrie & Bolus, (1905)

Synonyms
- Erica coralliflora Compton; Erica macropus Guthrie & Bolus

= Erica haematosiphon =

Species of flowering plant

Erica haematosiphon, the bloedbuisies, is a plant that belongs to the genus Erica and forms part of the fynbos. The species is endemic to the Western Cape.
