= Erica lerouxiae =

Scientific classification
- Kingdom: Plantae
- Clade: Tracheophytes
- Clade: Angiosperms
- Clade: Eudicots
- Clade: Asterids
- Order: Ericales
- Family: Ericaceae
- Genus: Erica
- Species: E. lerouxiae

Binomial name
- Erica lerouxiae Bolus

Species of flowering plant

Erica lerouxiae is a plant belonging to the genus Erica and is part of the fynbos. The species is endemic to the Western Cape and occurs at Jonkershoek and Franschhoek. The habitat is threatened by invasive plants, pine plantations, dam construction, vineyard plantings and excessive veld fires.
