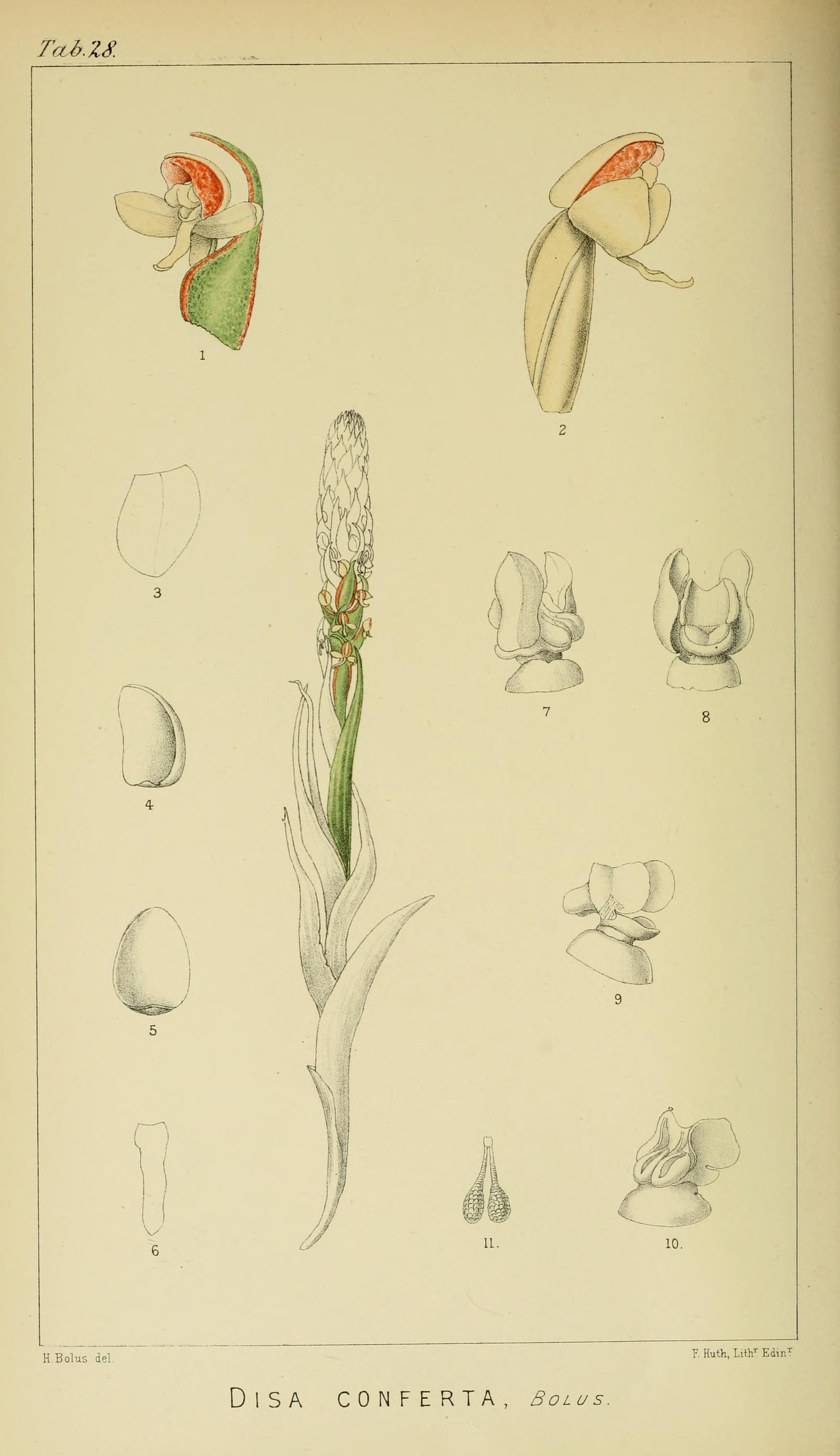

Scientific classification
- Kingdom: Plantae
- Clade: Tracheophytes
- Clade: Angiosperms
- Clade: Monocots
- Order: Asparagales
- Family: Orchidaceae
- Subfamily: Orchidoideae
- Genus: Disa
- Species: D. conferta

Binomial name
- Disa conferta Bolus

Synonyms
- Monadenia conferta (Bolus) Kraenzl.

= Disa conferta =

Species of flowering plant

Disa conferta is a perennial plant and geophyte that belongs to the genus Disa and is part of the fynbos. The plant is endemic to the Western Cape and has no threats.
