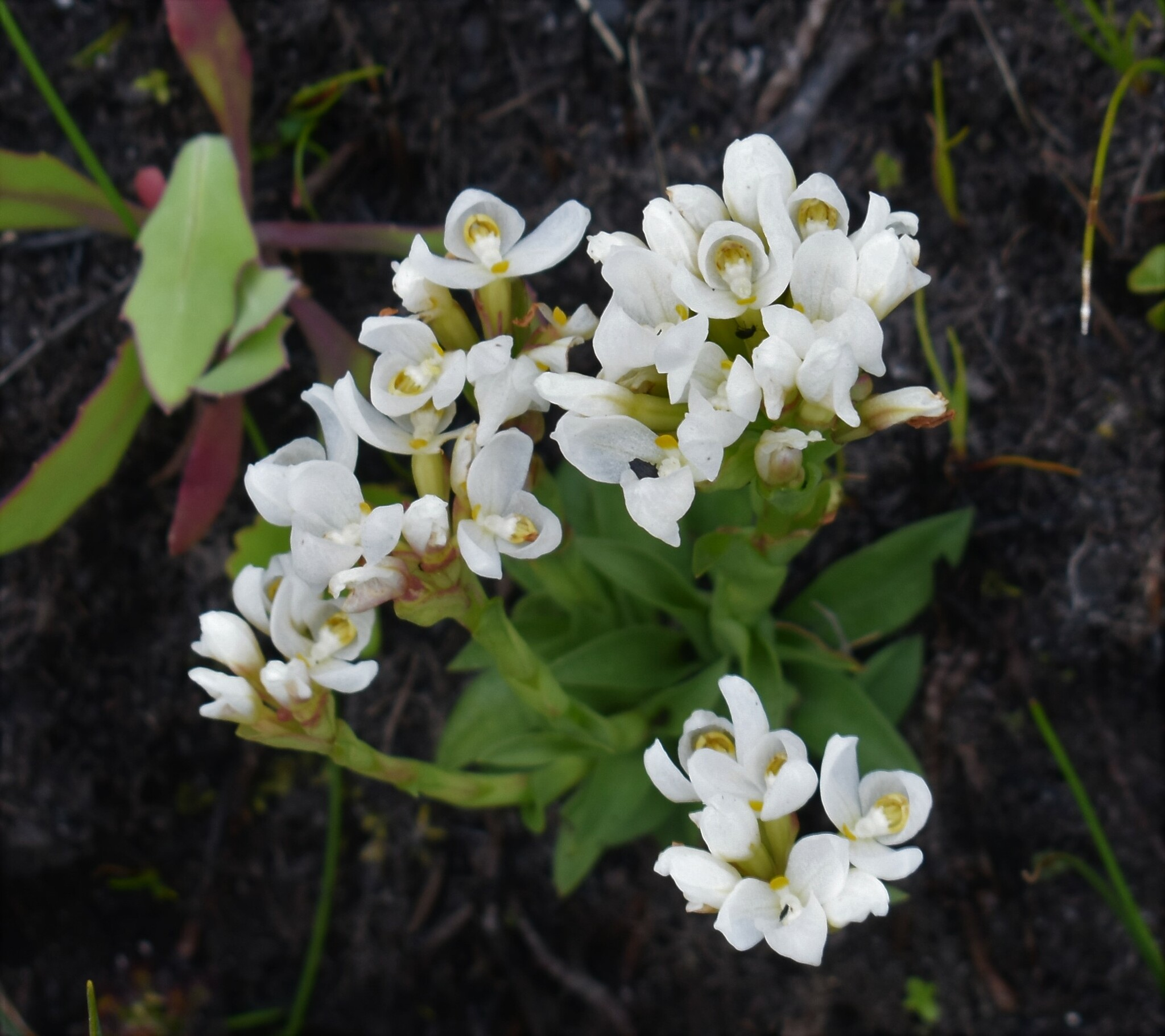

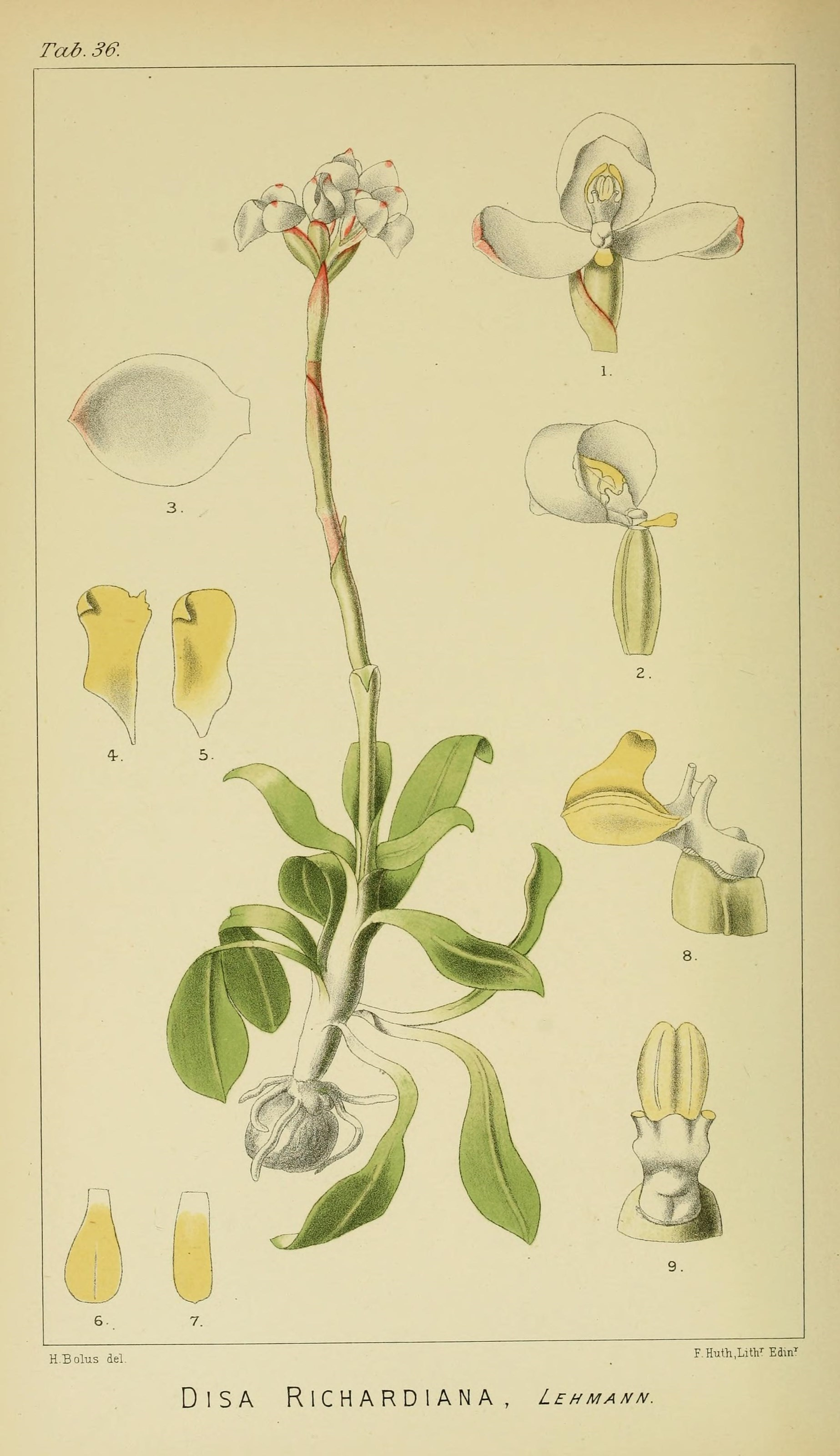

Scientific classification
- Kingdom: Plantae
- Clade: Tracheophytes
- Clade: Angiosperms
- Clade: Monocots
- Order: Asparagales
- Family: Orchidaceae
- Subfamily: Orchidoideae
- Genus: Disa
- Species: D. richardiana

Binomial name
- Disa richardiana Lehm. ex Bolus

Synonyms
- Orthopenthea obtusa (Lindl.) Schelpe; Orthopenthea richardiana (Lehm. ex Bolus) Rolfe; Penthea obtusa Lindl.; Penthea virginea Harv.

= Disa richardiana =

Species of flowering plant

Disa richardiana is a perennial plant and geophyte belonging to the genus Disa and part of the fynbos. The plant is endemic to the Western Cape.
