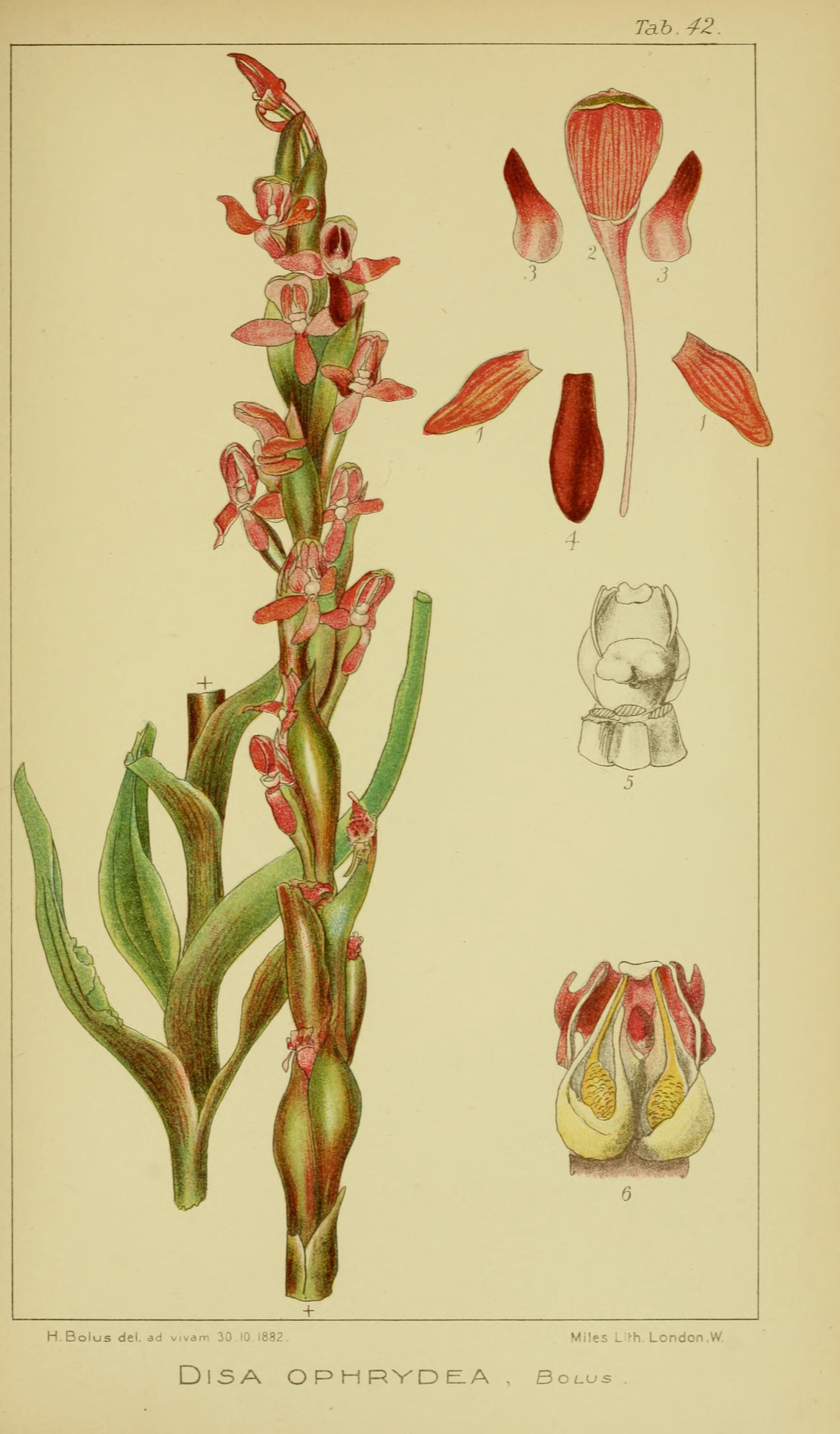

Scientific classification
- Kingdom: Plantae
- Clade: Tracheophytes
- Clade: Angiosperms
- Clade: Monocots
- Order: Asparagales
- Family: Orchidaceae
- Subfamily: Orchidoideae
- Genus: Disa
- Species: D. oreophila

Binomial name
- Disa oreophila Bolus

= Disa oreophila =

Species of flowering plant

Disa oreophila is a perennial plant and geophyte belonging to the genus Disa. The plant is native to KwaZulu-Natal, Lesotho, Mpumalanga, Eastern Cape and the Free State.

The plant has two subspecies:

- Disa oreophila subsp. erecta H.P.Linder
- Disa oreophila subsp. oreophila
