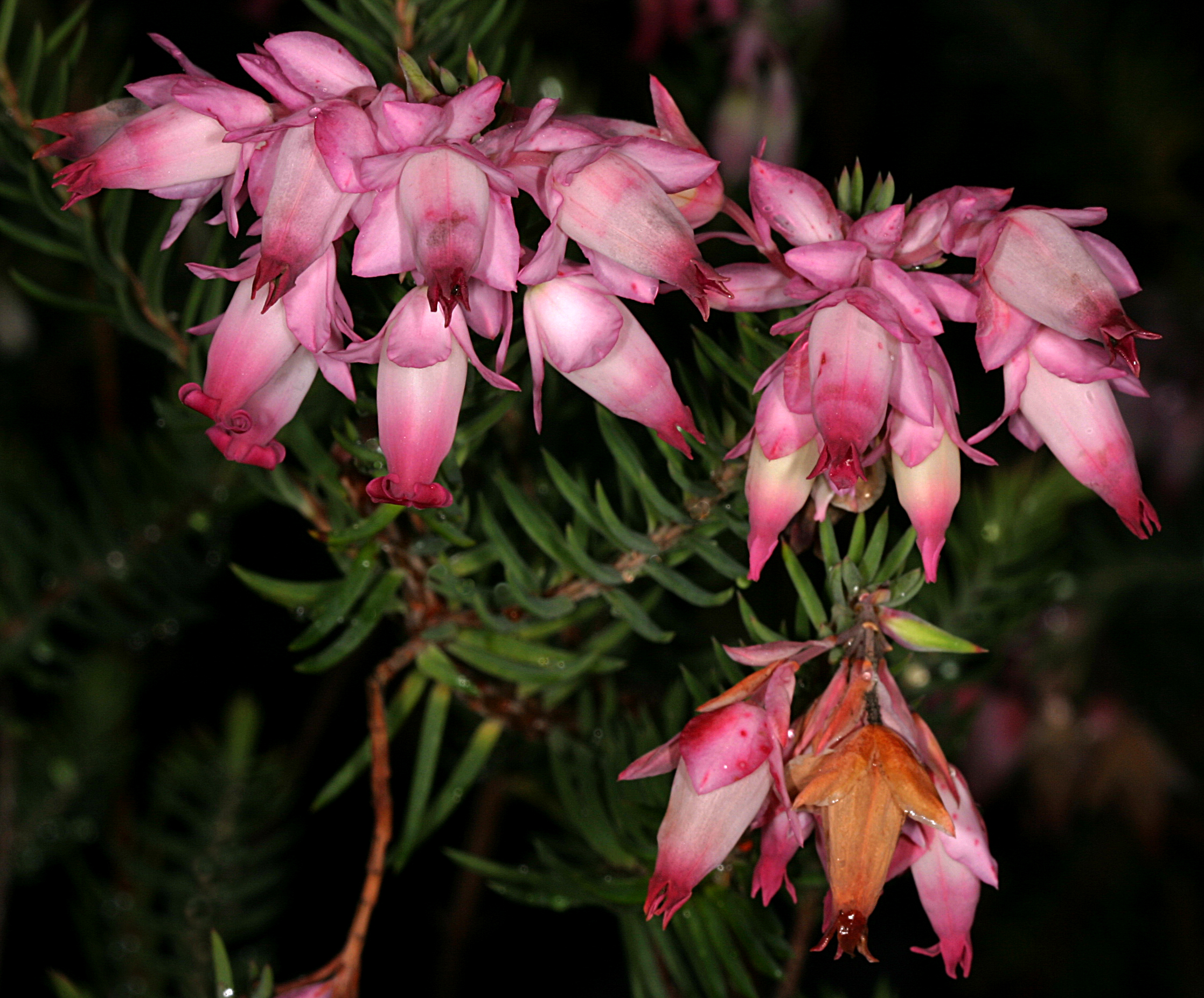

Scientific classification
- Kingdom: Plantae
- Clade: Tracheophytes
- Clade: Angiosperms
- Clade: Eudicots
- Clade: Asterids
- Order: Ericales
- Family: Ericaceae
- Genus: Erica
- Species: E. eugenea

Binomial name
- Erica eugenea Dulfer

Synonyms
- Erica haroldiana Skan; Erica nobilis Guthrie & Bolus

= Erica eugenea =

Species of flowering plant

Erica eugenea is a plant belonging to the genus Erica and forming part of the fynbos. The species is endemic to the Western Cape.
