= Erica canescens =

Scientific classification
- Kingdom: Plantae
- Clade: Tracheophytes
- Clade: Angiosperms
- Clade: Eudicots
- Clade: Asterids
- Order: Ericales
- Family: Ericaceae
- Genus: Erica
- Species: E. canescens

Binomial name
- Erica canescens J.C.Wendl.

Synonyms
- Erica canescens var. micranthera Bolus; Erica pusilla Salisb.; Erica pusilla var. micranthera Bolus; Erica villosiuscula G.Lodd.; Ericoides pusillum Kuntze

Species of flowering plant

Erica canescens is a plant belonging to the genus Erica, and forming part of the fynbos. The species is endemic to the Western Cape.
