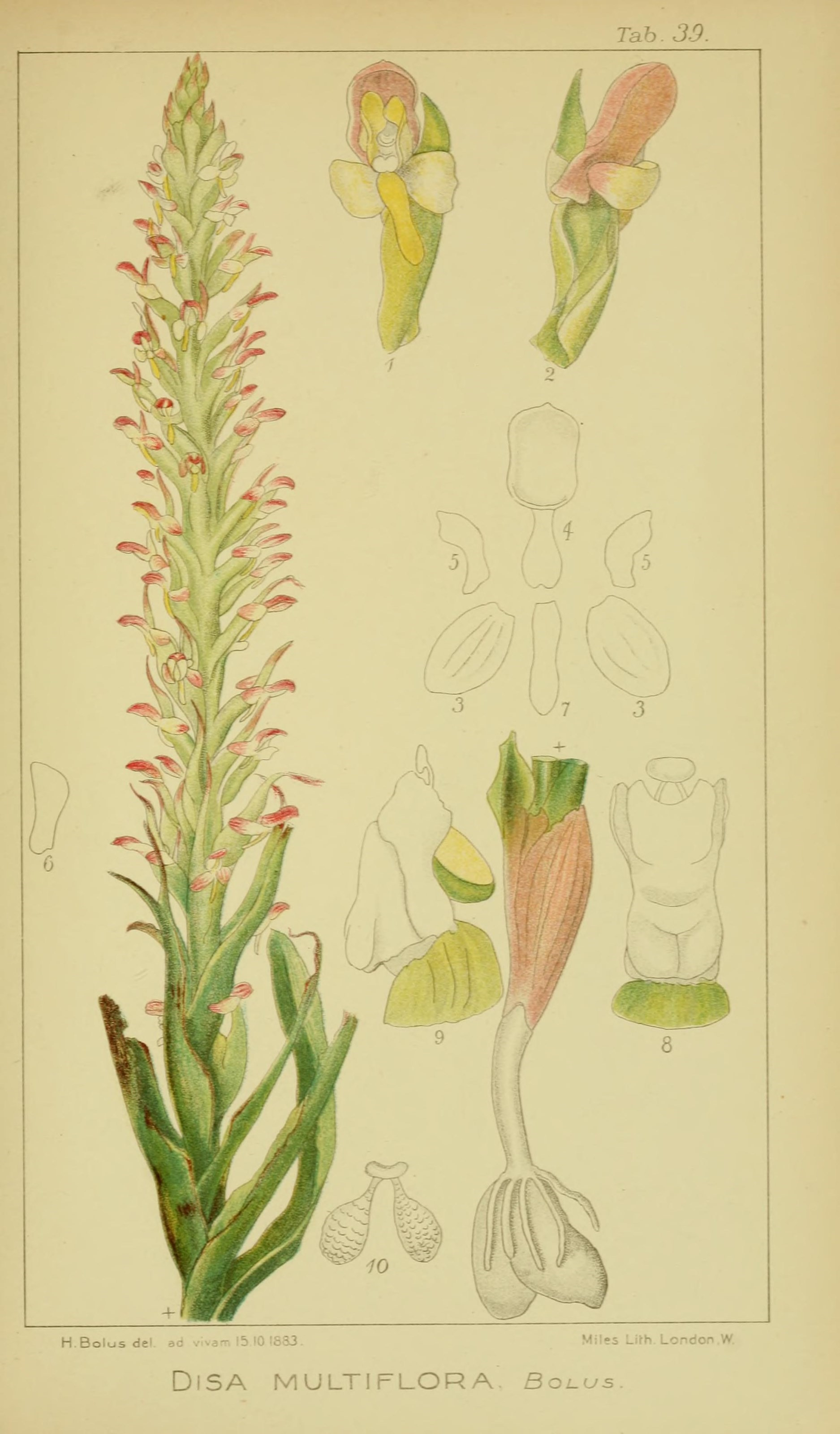

Scientific classification
- Kingdom: Plantae
- Clade: Tracheophytes
- Clade: Angiosperms
- Clade: Monocots
- Order: Asparagales
- Family: Orchidaceae
- Subfamily: Orchidoideae
- Genus: Disa
- Species: D. densiflora

Binomial name
- Disa densiflora (Lindl.) Bolus

Synonyms
- Disa auriculata Bolus; Disa multiflora (Sond.) Bolus; Monadenia auriculata (Bolus) Rolfe; Monadenia densiflora Lindl.; Monadenia multiflora Sond.

= Disa densiflora =

Species of flowering plant

Disa densiflora is a perennial plant and geophyte belonging to the genus Disa and is part of the fynbos. The plant is endemic to the Eastern Cape and Western Cape.
