= Disa venusta =

Scientific classification
- Kingdom: Plantae
- Clade: Tracheophytes
- Clade: Angiosperms
- Clade: Monocots
- Order: Asparagales
- Family: Orchidaceae
- Subfamily: Orchidoideae
- Genus: Disa
- Species: D. venusta

Binomial name
- Disa venusta Bolus

Synonyms
- Herschelia venusta (Bolus) Kraenzl.; Herschelianthe venusta (Bolus) Rauschert

Species of flowering plant

Disa venusta is a perennial plant and geophyte belonging to the genus Disa and is part of the fynbos. The plant is endemic to the Western Cape and occurs from the Cape Peninsula to Bredasdorp, mostly below 450 m above sea level. The plant has an area of occurrence of 2920 km2. The species' habitat is constantly shrinking due to coastal development, invasive plants and a lack of veld fires.
