= Erica lateralis =

Scientific classification
- Kingdom: Plantae
- Clade: Tracheophytes
- Clade: Angiosperms
- Clade: Eudicots
- Clade: Asterids
- Order: Ericales
- Family: Ericaceae
- Genus: Erica
- Species: E. lateralis

Binomial name
- Erica lateralis Willd.

Synonyms
- Erica arbuscula G.Lodd. ex J.Forbes; Erica declinata Hornem.; Erica fibula Link; Erica guttiflora Salisb.; Erica haemantha Bolus; Erica incarnata Andrews; Erica montana L.Bolus; Erica oreina Dulfer; Erica pedunculata .C.Wendl.

Species of flowering plant

Erica lateralis, the button heath, is a plant belonging to the genus Erica and is part of the fynbos. The species is endemic to the Western Cape.
