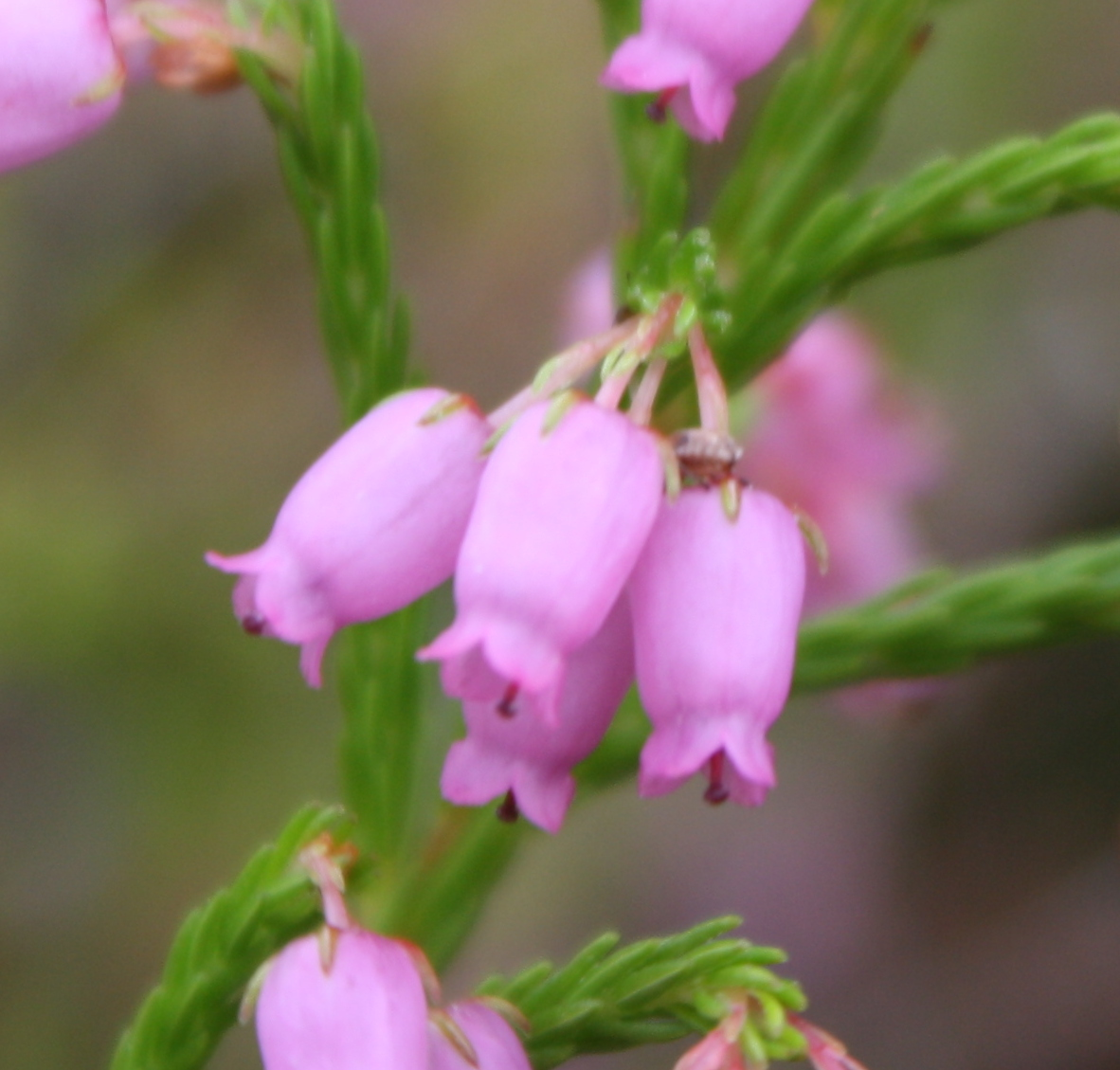

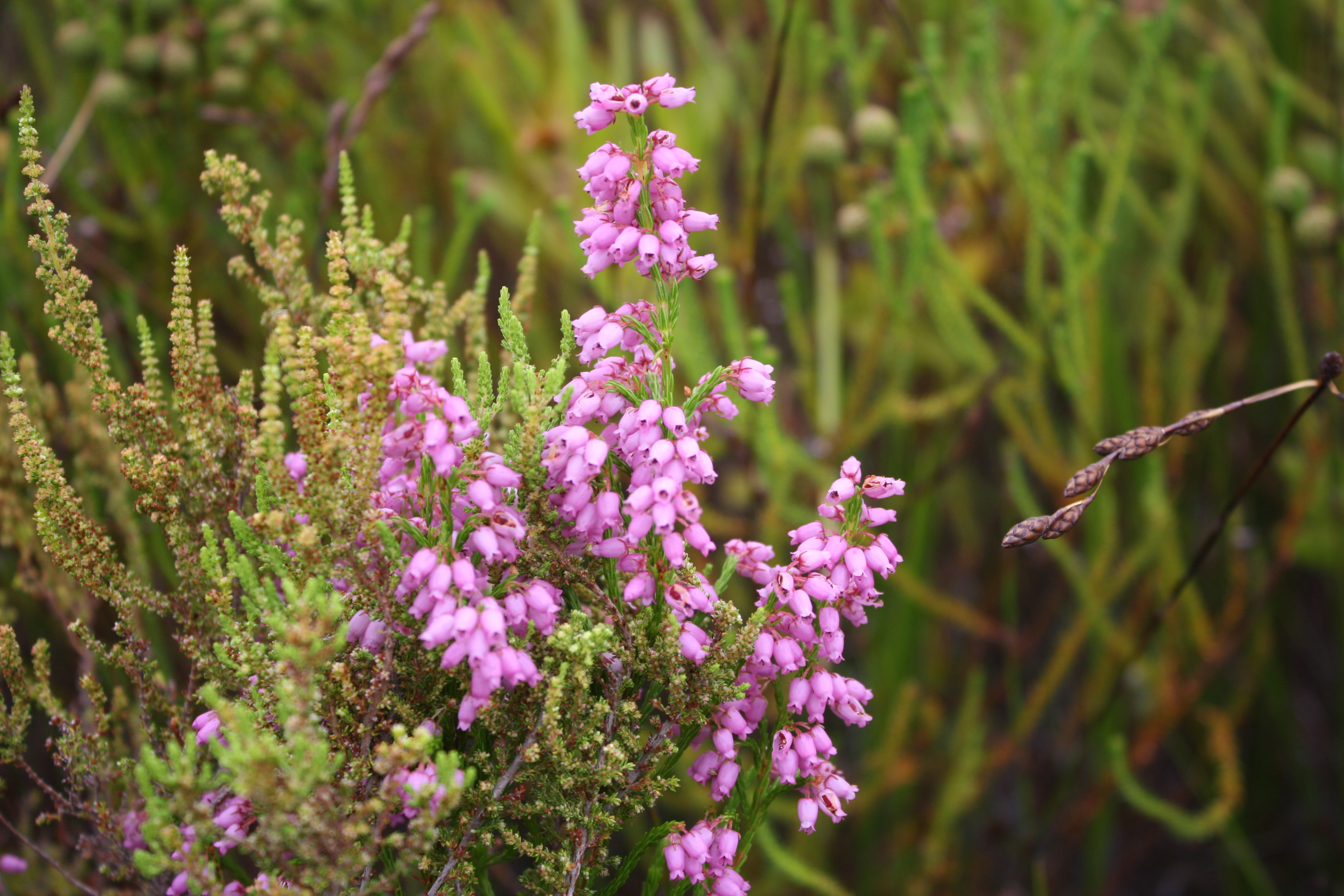

Scientific classification
- Kingdom: Plantae
- Clade: Tracheophytes
- Clade: Angiosperms
- Clade: Eudicots
- Clade: Asterids
- Order: Ericales
- Family: Ericaceae
- Genus: Erica
- Species: E. laeta

Binomial name
- Erica laeta Bartl.

Synonyms
- Erica laeta var. incisa Bolus; Erica rubens Andrews; Ericoides laetum (Bartl.) Kuntze

= Erica laeta =

Species of flowering plant

Erica laeta is a plant belonging to the genus Erica and is part of the fynbos. The species is endemic to the Western Cape.
