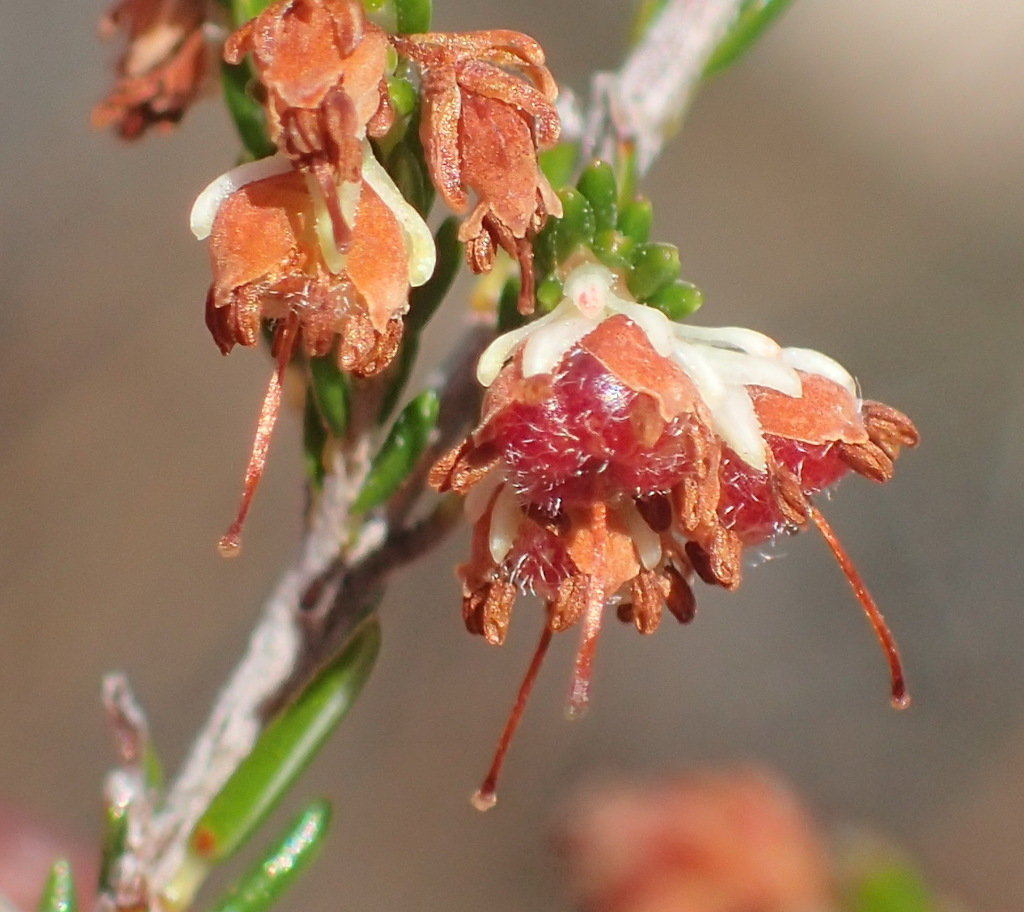

Scientific classification
- Kingdom: Plantae
- Clade: Tracheophytes
- Clade: Angiosperms
- Clade: Eudicots
- Clade: Asterids
- Order: Ericales
- Family: Ericaceae
- Genus: Erica
- Species: E. zwartbergensis

Binomial name
- Erica zwartbergensis Bolus

= Erica zwartbergensis =

Species of flowering plant

Erica zwartbergensis, the swartberg shield heath, is a species of perennial flowering plant in the family Ericaceae. It is one of the numerous endemic species of South Africa in the genus Erica.
