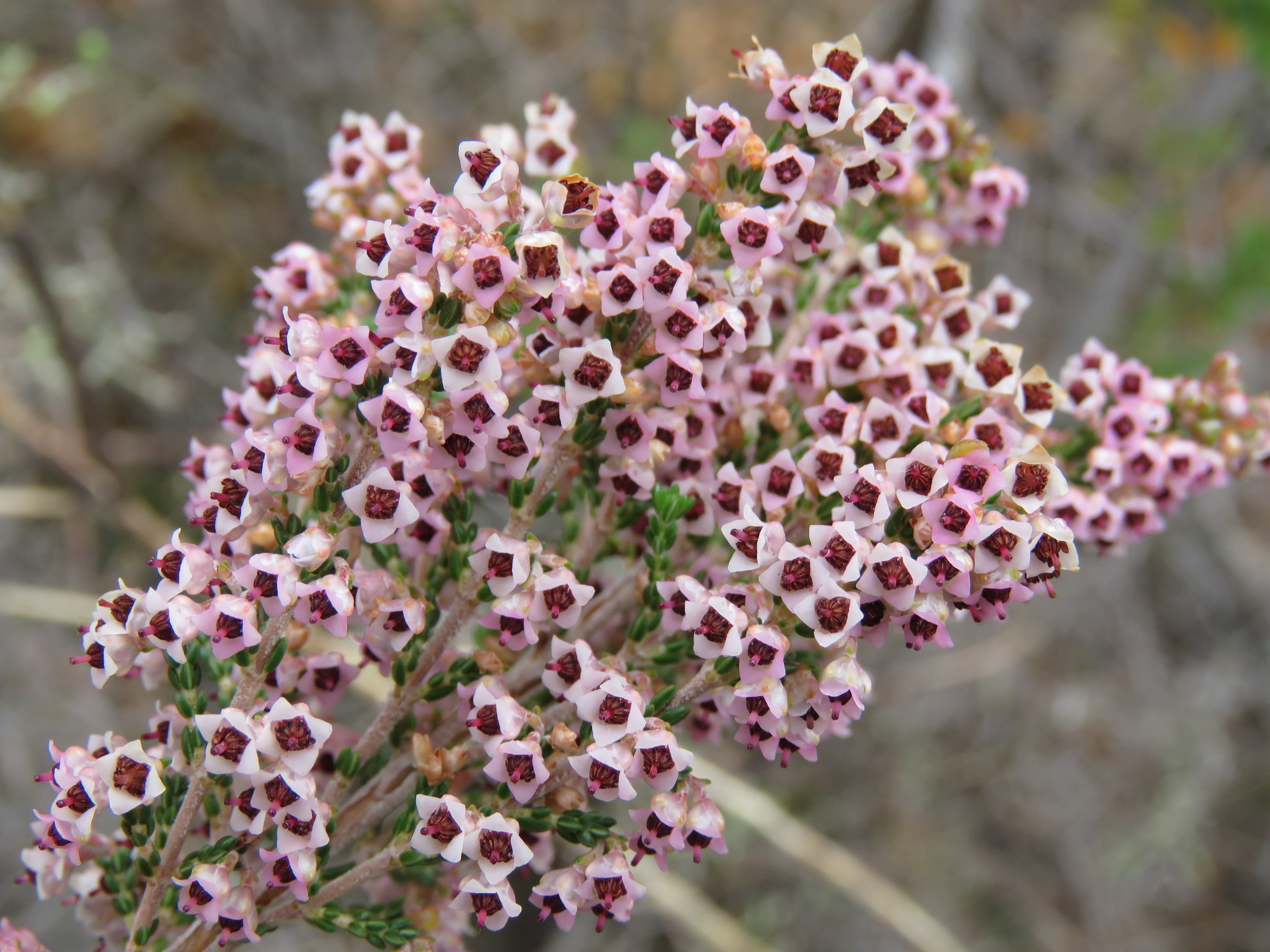

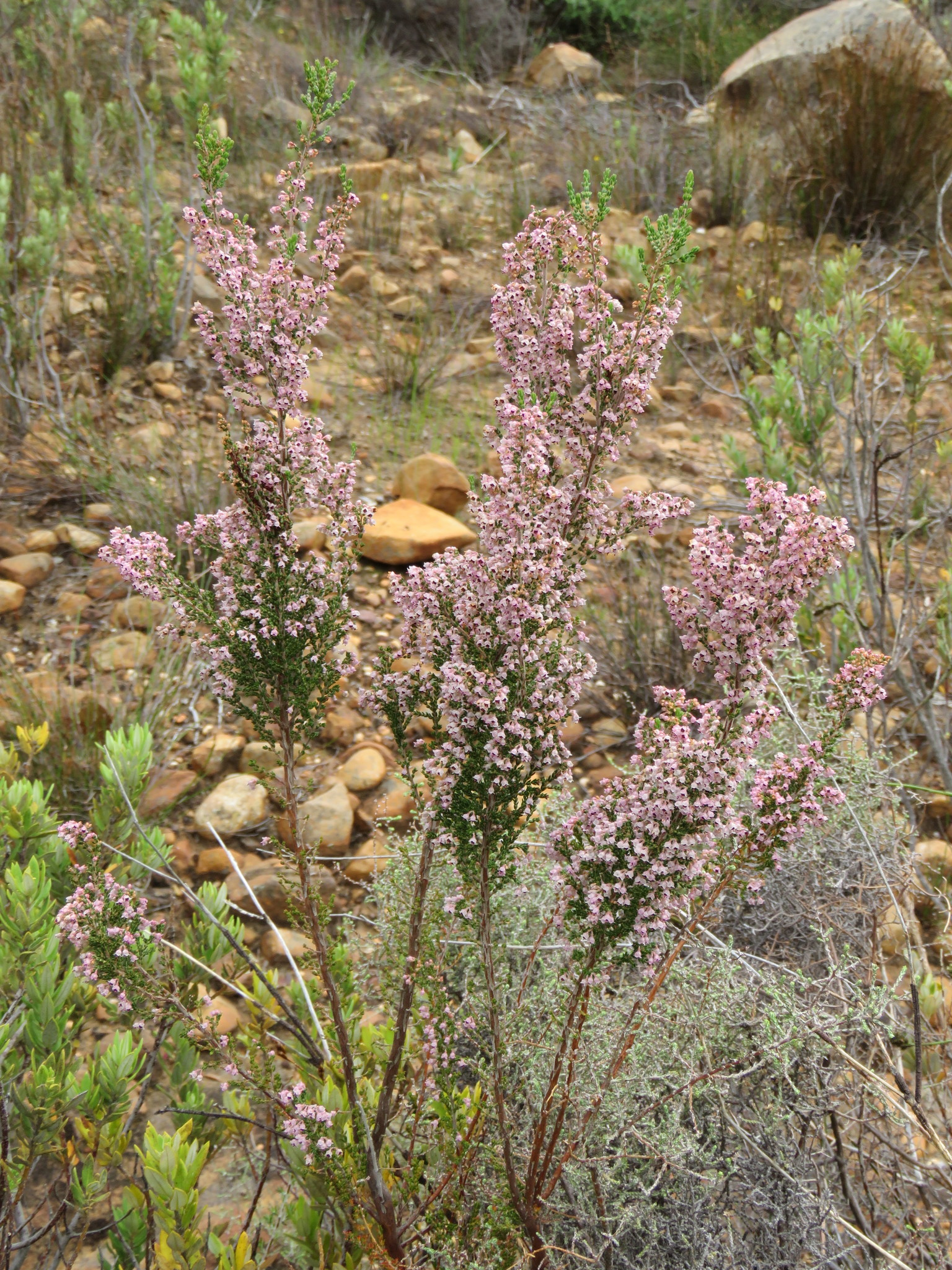

Scientific classification
- Kingdom: Plantae
- Clade: Tracheophytes
- Clade: Angiosperms
- Clade: Eudicots
- Clade: Asterids
- Order: Ericales
- Family: Ericaceae
- Genus: Erica
- Species: E. lucida

Binomial name
- Erica lucida Salisb.

Synonyms
- Ericoides lucidum (Salisb.) Kuntze

= Erica lucida =

Species of flowering plant

Erica lucida is a plant belonging to the genus Erica and is part of the fynbos. The species is endemic to the Western Cape.

== Varieties ==
The species has three varieties:

- Erica lucida var. laxa (Kuntze) Bolus
- Erica lucida var. lucida
- Erica lucida var. pauciflora Bolus
