= Erica berzelioides =

Scientific classification
- Kingdom: Plantae
- Clade: Tracheophytes
- Clade: Angiosperms
- Clade: Eudicots
- Clade: Asterids
- Order: Ericales
- Family: Ericaceae
- Genus: Erica
- Species: E. berzelioides

Binomial name
- Erica berzelioides Guthrie & Bolus

Species of flowering plant

Erica berzelioides is a plant belonging to the genus Erica and forming part of the fynbos. The species is endemic to the Western Cape. There is only one population at Heuningrug southwest of Bredasdorp. The plant's habitat is threatened by overgrazing, excessive fires and invasive plants, especially the acacia species. The most recent survey only found ten plants.
