= Harry Bolus =

South African artist and botanist (1834–1911)

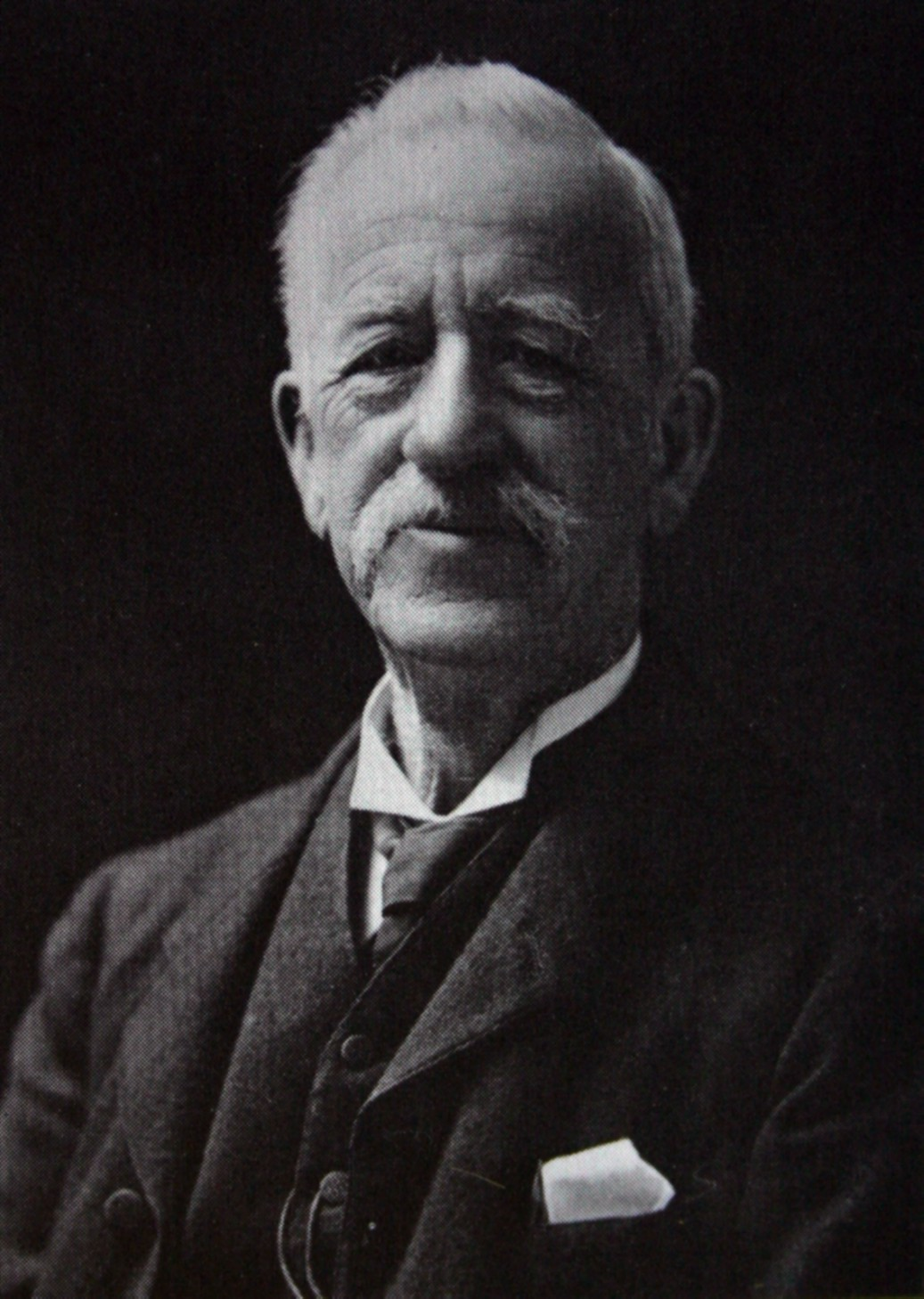
- Born: 28 April 1834
- Died: 25 May 1911 (aged 77)
- Occupations: Botanist, botanical artist, businessman

Harry Bolus (28 April 1834 – 25 May 1911) was a South African botanist, botanical artist, businessman and philanthropist. He advanced botany in South Africa by establishing bursaries, founding the Bolus Herbarium and bequeathing his library and a large part of his fortune to the South African College (now the University of Cape Town). Active in scientific circles, he was a Fellow of the Linnean Society, member and president of the South African Philosophical Society (later the Royal Society of South Africa), the SA Medal and Grant by the SA Association for the Advancement of Science and an honorary D.Sc. from the University of the Cape of Good Hope.

== Biography ==
Bolus was born in Nottingham, England. He was educated at Castle Gate School, Nottingham. The headmaster George Herbert regularly corresponded with and received plant specimens from William Kensit of Grahamstown, South Africa. Kensit requested that the headmaster send him one of his pupils as an assistant; Harry Bolus duly landed at Port Elizabeth from the ship Jane in March 1850. He spent two years with Kensit and then moved to Port Elizabeth. Following a short visit to England, he settled in Graaff-Reinet, where he would live for the next 19 years. In 1857 he married Sophia Kensit, the sister of William Kensit. Between 1858 and 1870 they had 3 sons and a daughter. In 1864 he lost his eldest son of six years, and Francis Guthrie who had become a close friend, suggested his taking up botany to ameliorate his loss. He started his botanical collection in 1865 and was soon corresponding with Joseph Hooker at Kew, William Henry Harvey in Dublin and Peter MacOwan in Grahamstown. One of his most treasured gifts was a copy of De Candolle's Prodromus received from Guthrie in 1869. In 1875, he joined his brother Walter in Cape Town, settling in the suburb of Kenilworth, where they founded a stockbroking firm called Bolus Bros. The following year he and Guthrie made their first visit to Kew, taking with them a large number of plant specimens for naming. Bolus described the period as 'forty happy days'. Returning in the Windsor Castle in October 1876, the ship struck a reef off Dassen Island with the loss of his specimens and notes. Not daunted, he set about the collection of new specimens and organised expeditions to various corners of South Africa. He was an excellent field botanist and published numerous books on his observations. Although adventurous by nature, he was also quiet and unassuming. With Peter MacOwan he issued the exsiccata Herbarium normale Austro-africanum conflaverunt Macowan & Bolus (1884 - ?1892).

His business flourished so he was able to acquire many fine botanical books. Complete sets of the Botanical Magazine, Botanical Register, Refugium Botanicum, and the large folios of Pierre-Joseph Redouté, Nikolaus Joseph von Jacquin, Ferdinand Bauer and Francis Masson formed part of his collection. He founded the Harry Bolus Professorship at the University of Cape Town and left a large trust for scholarships. He also donated his extensive herbarium and library to the South African College. He was one of the founding Members of the South African Philosophical Society.

Harry Bolus loved visiting England and made a total of 28 voyages (14 each way) to and from South Africa. He died of heart failure at Oxted, Surrey, on 25 May 1911. His youngest son Frank married Harriet Margaret Louisa Kensit, William Kensit's granddaughter, the following year. She had worked as Harry's assistant in the herbarium while she was in college, was appointed curator of the Bolus Herbarium in 1903, and retired from that position in 1955.

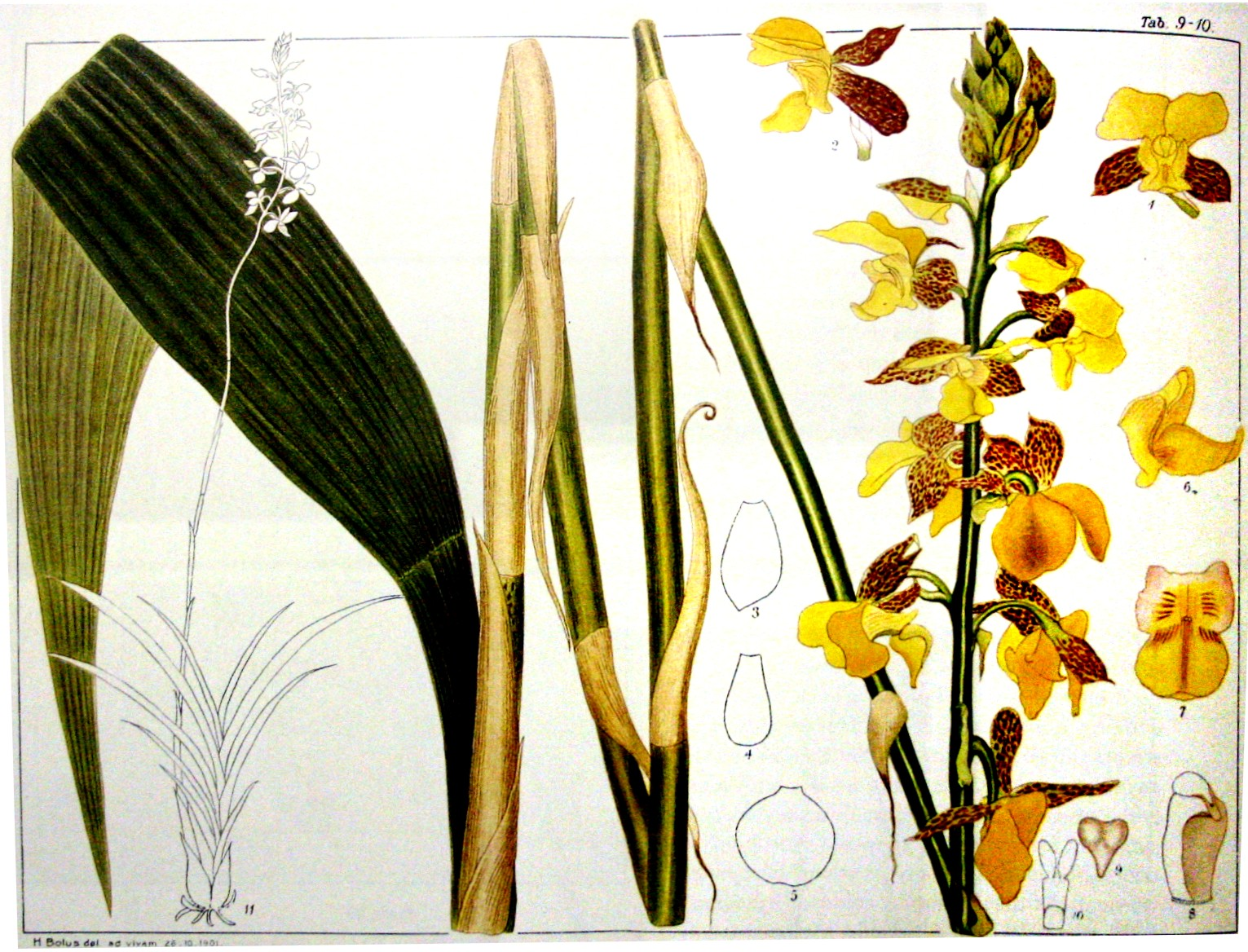
Eulophia streptopetala Lindl., 1901 painting by Harry Bolus

== Correspondence ==
Harry Bolus corresponded widely with his contemporaries, including a number of famous people such as the Victorian naturalist Alfred Russel Wallace, the English botanist and explorer Sir Joseph Dalton Hooker and the South African writer and poet C. Louis Leipoldt.

== Collecting expeditions ==
- Namaqualand 1883
- Eastern Cape with Henry George Flanagan, Florence Sarah Flanagan (née Reynolds) and EE Galpin
- Lourenço Marques to Barberton to Pretoria to Cape Town 1886
- Orange Free State (Bester's Vlei, Witzieshoek, Mont-aux-Sources) with Henry George Flanagan and Florence Sarah Flanagan (née Reynolds) 1893–94
- Transvaal and Swaziland 1904–06

== Honours ==
He is commemorated in five genera: Bolusia Benth., Bolusafra Kuntze, Neobolusia Schltr., Bolusanthus Harms (in 1906,) and Bolusiella Schltr., as well as numerous other specific names.

== Publications ==
- A Preliminary List of the Cape Orchids 1881
- The Orchids of the Cape Peninsula. South African Philosophical Society. 1888.
- Descriptions of the 117 Cape Peninsula Orchids illustrated by 36 plates drawn and coloured by himself.
- A Sketch of the Flora of South Africa 1886
- Icones Orchidearum Austro-africanarum Extra-tropicarum: Or Figures, with Descriptions, of Extra-tropical South African Orchids. William Wesley and Son. 1896.
- Icones Orchidearum Austro-Africanum Extra-tropicarum Volume 1 Part 1 comprising 50 plates 1893.
- Icones Orchidearum Austro-Africanum Extra-tropicarum Part 2 1896.
- Icones Orchidearum Austro-Africanum Extra-tropicarum Volume 2 comprising 100 plates 1911 (shortly after his death).
- Icones Orchidearum Austro-Africanum Extra-tropicarum Volume 3 edited by his grand-niece Miss H. M. L. Kensit, and containing 9 plates painted by his son Frank 1913.
- A List of Flowering Plants and Ferns of the Cape Peninsula with Wolley-Dod
- "Ericaceae" for Flora Capensis with Francis Guthrie and N. E. Brown
