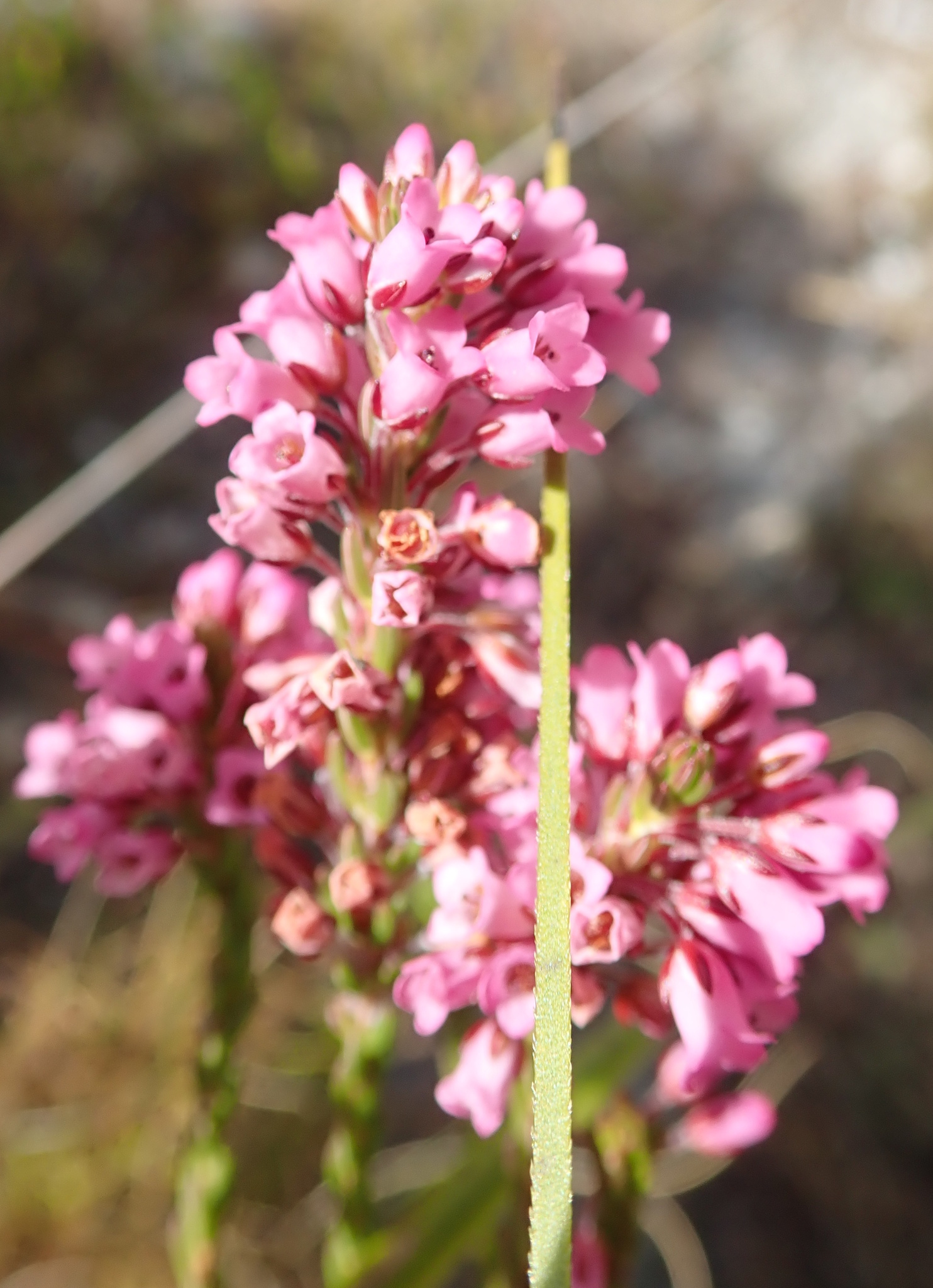

Scientific classification
- Kingdom: Plantae
- Clade: Tracheophytes
- Clade: Angiosperms
- Clade: Eudicots
- Clade: Asterids
- Order: Ericales
- Family: Ericaceae
- Genus: Erica
- Species: E. longiaristata

Binomial name
- Erica longiaristata Benth.

Synonyms
- Ericoides longiaristatum (Benth.) Kuntze

= Erica longiaristata =

Species of flowering plant

Erica longiaristata, the Agulhas heath, longiaristata heath and long-awned heath, is a plant belonging to the genus Erica. The species is endemic to the Western Cape and is frequently confused with the similar species Erica pulchella.
