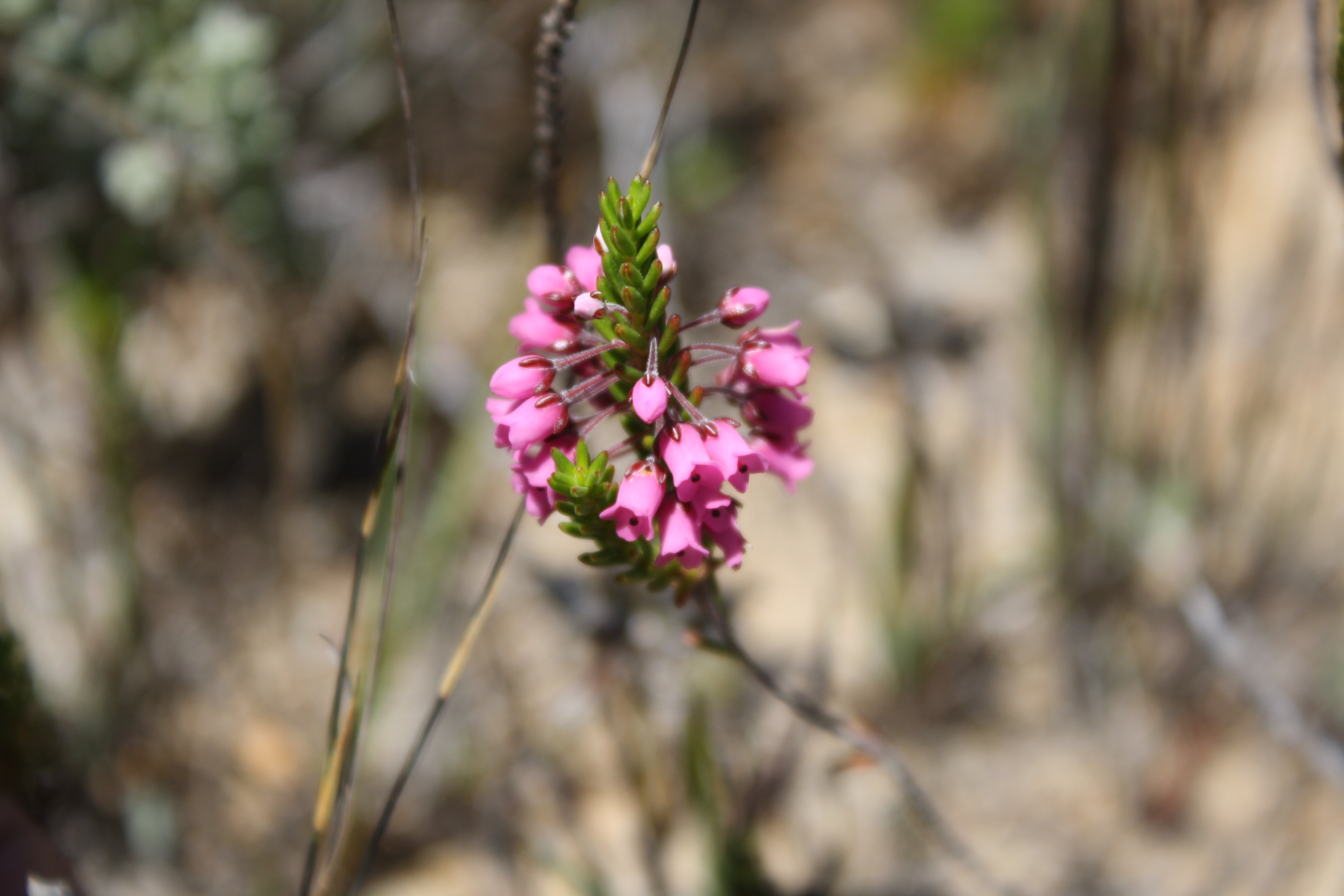

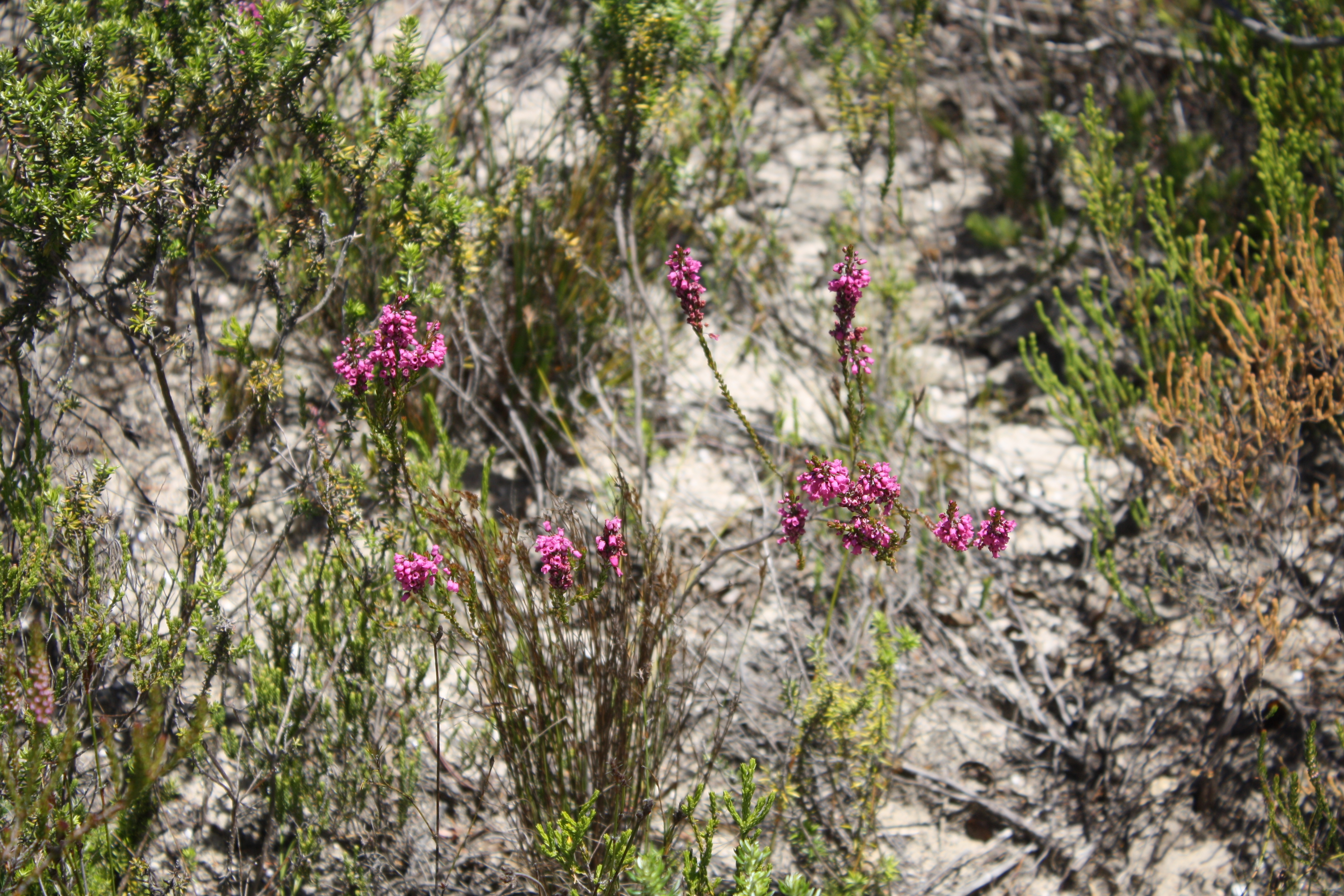

Scientific classification
- Kingdom: Plantae
- Clade: Tracheophytes
- Clade: Angiosperms
- Clade: Eudicots
- Clade: Asterids
- Order: Ericales
- Family: Ericaceae
- Genus: Erica
- Species: E. pulchella

Binomial name
- Erica pulchella Houtt.

Synonyms
- Ericoides pulchellum (Houtt.) Kuntze

= Erica pulchella =

Species of flowering plant

Erica pulchella, the pink rattle heath, is a plant belonging to the genus Erica and is part of the fynbos. The species is endemic to the Western Cape and occurs from the Cape Peninsula to Mossel Bay and is frequently confused with Erica longiaristata.

The species has two varieties:

- Erica pulchella var. major T.M.Salter
- Erica pulchella var. pulchella
