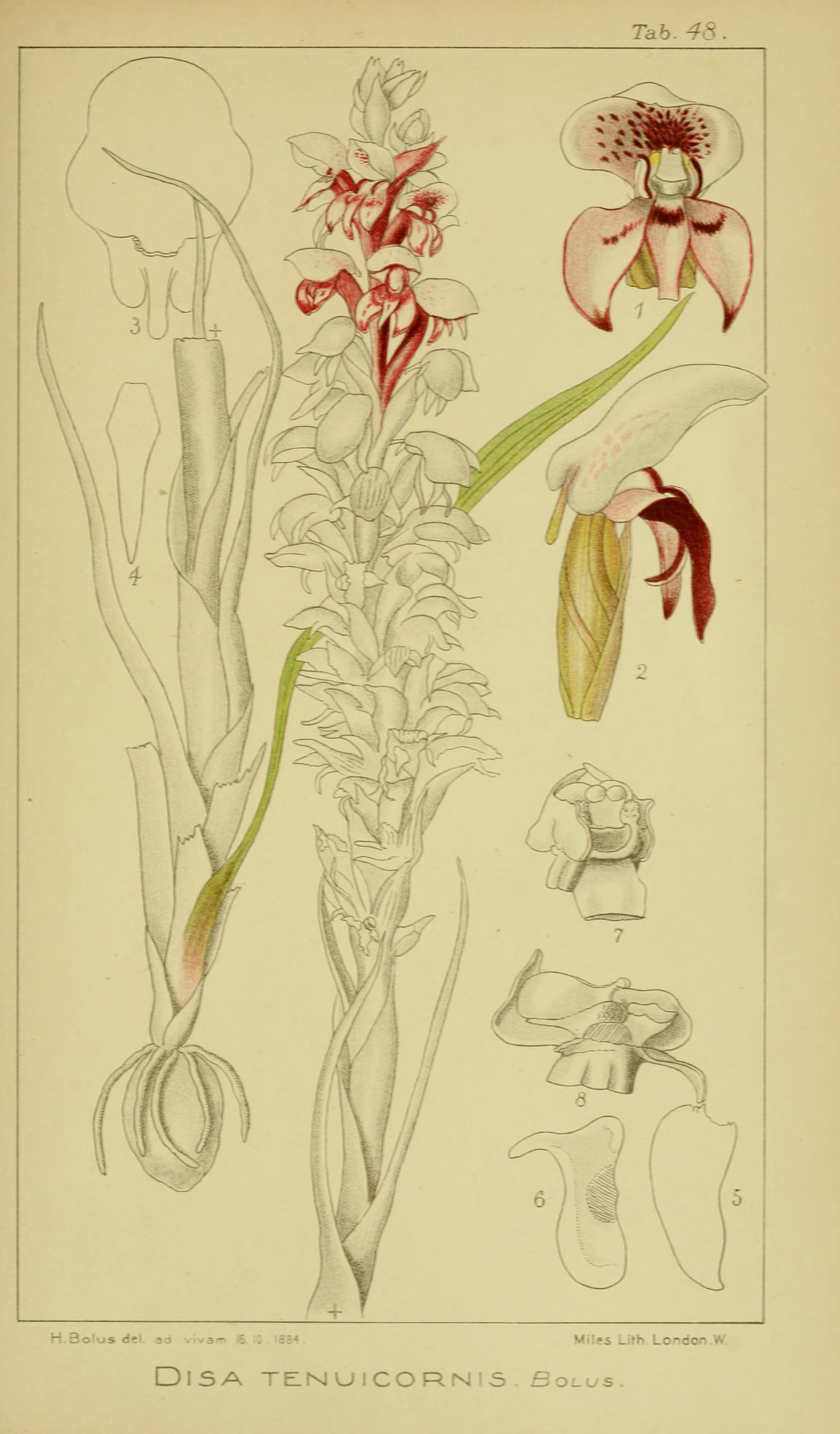

Scientific classification
- Kingdom: Plantae
- Clade: Tracheophytes
- Clade: Angiosperms
- Clade: Monocots
- Order: Asparagales
- Family: Orchidaceae
- Subfamily: Orchidoideae
- Genus: Disa
- Species: D. tenuicornis

Binomial name
- Disa tenuicornis Bolus

= Disa tenuicornis =

Species of flowering plant

Disa tenuicornis is a perennial plant and geophyte belonging to the genus Disa and is part of the fynbos. The plant is endemic to the Western Cape and occurs from the Cape Peninsula to the Riviersonderend Mountains on southern slopes. The plant has a range of 3600 km2 and currently has no threats.
