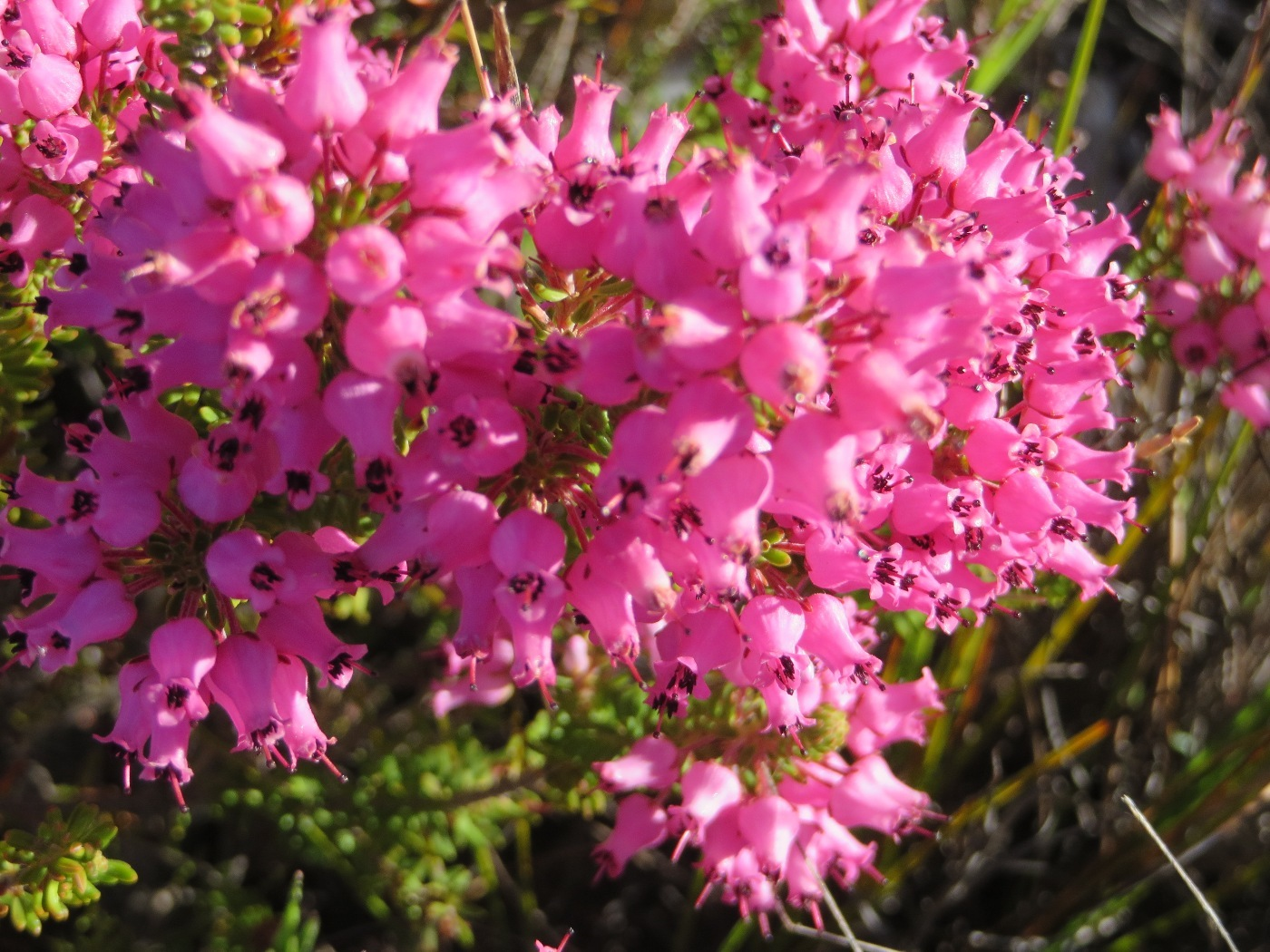

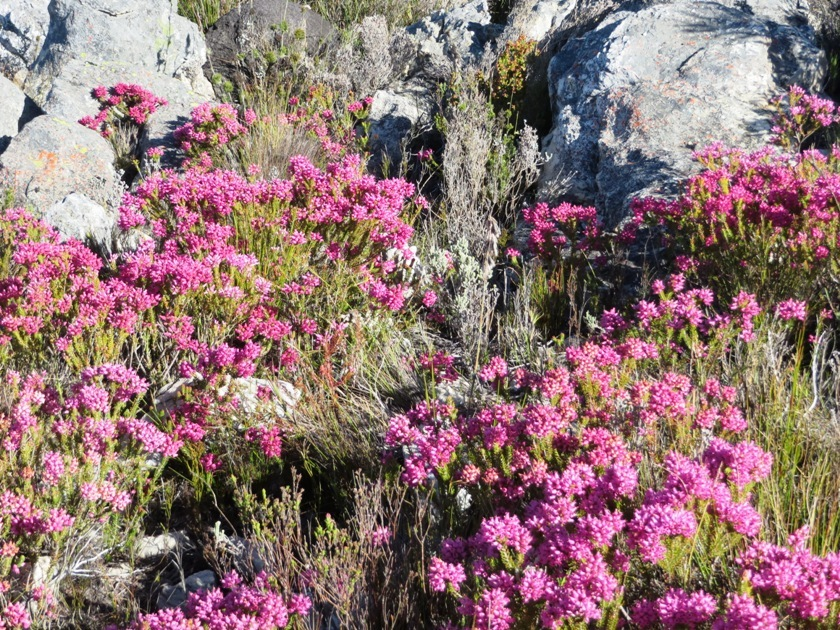

Scientific classification
- Kingdom: Plantae
- Clade: Tracheophytes
- Clade: Angiosperms
- Clade: Eudicots
- Clade: Asterids
- Order: Ericales
- Family: Ericaceae
- Genus: Erica
- Species: E. insolitanthera

Binomial name
- Erica insolitanthera H.A.Baker, (1972)

= Erica insolitanthera =

Species of flowering plant

Erica insolitanthera is a plant belonging to the genus Erica and is part of the fynbos. The species is endemic to the Western Cape and occurs in the Riviersonderend Mountains. The habitat is threatened by invasive plants.
