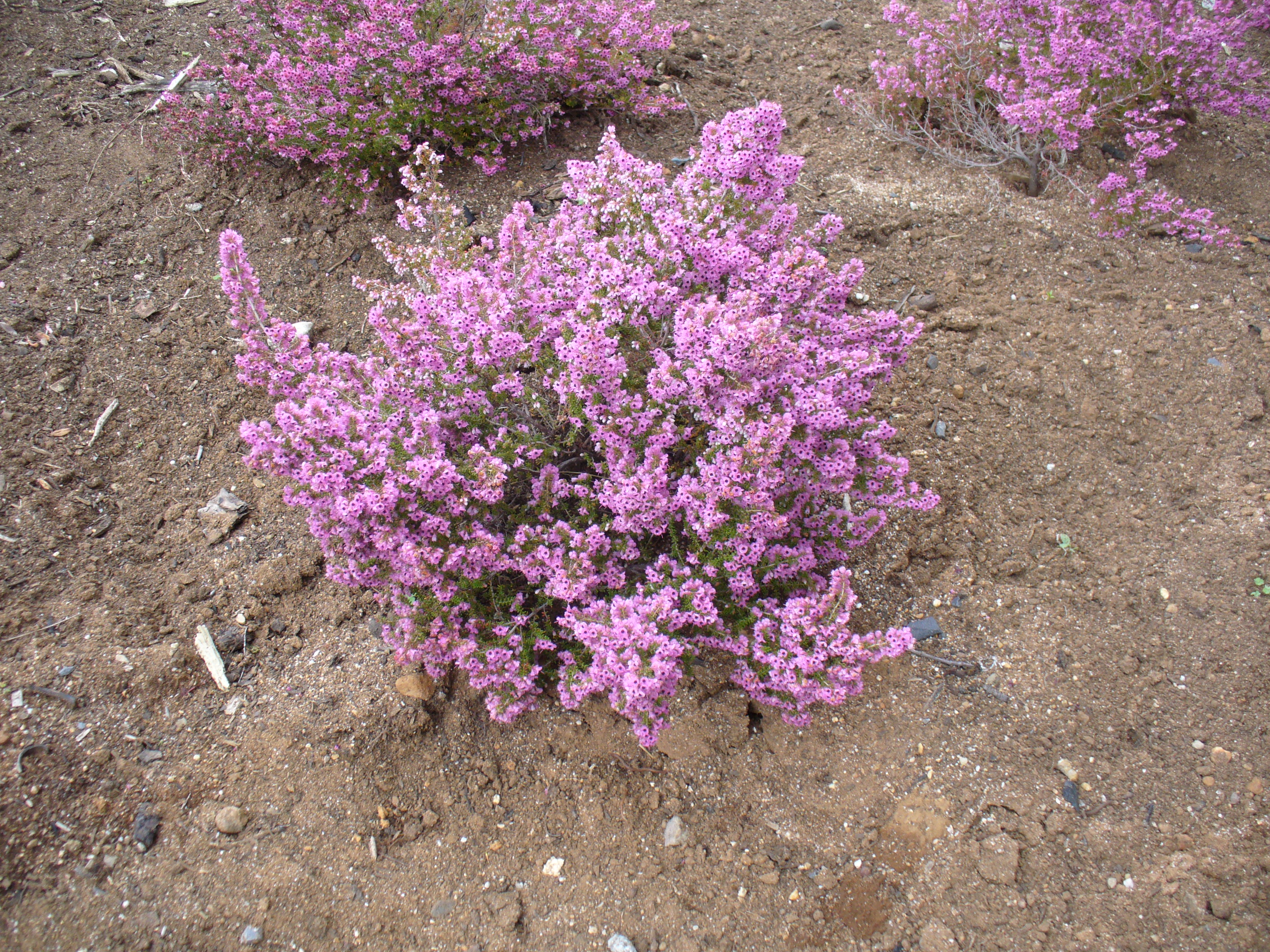

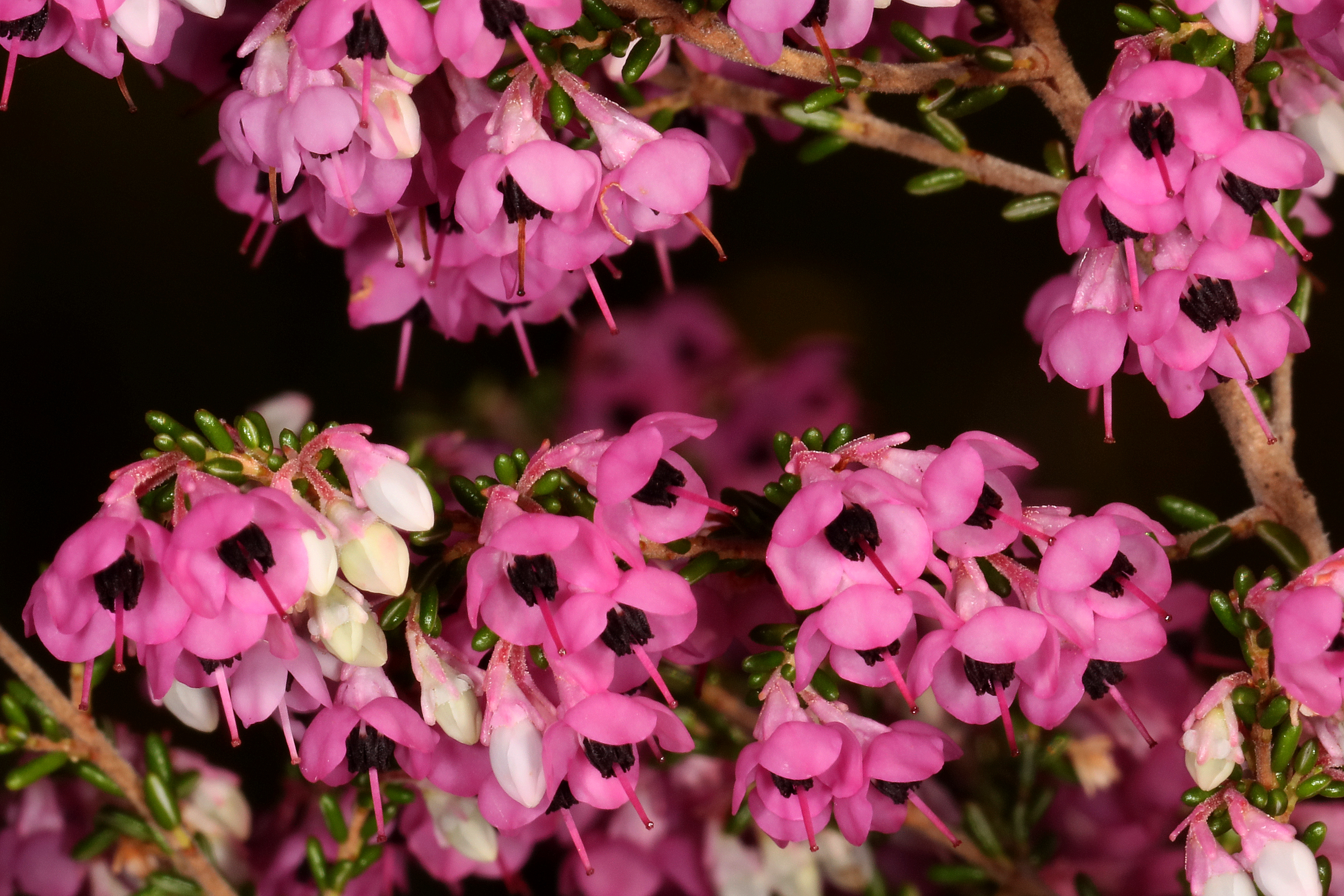

Scientific classification
- Kingdom: Plantae
- Clade: Tracheophytes
- Clade: Angiosperms
- Clade: Eudicots
- Clade: Asterids
- Order: Ericales
- Family: Ericaceae
- Genus: Erica
- Species: E. melanthera

Binomial name
- Erica melanthera L.

Synonyms
- Callista varia (Sinclair) G.Don; Erica caroliniana Benth.; Erica jubata Lodd. ex Spreng.; Erica leiophylla Benth.; Erica lysimachiiflora Salisb.; Erica mundtiana Klotzsch ex Benth.; Erica muricata H.L.Wendl. ex Benth.; Ericoides leiophyllum (Benth.) Kuntze; Ericoides melantherum (L.) Kuntze; Ericoides varium (Sinclair) Kuntze; Gypsocallis melanthera G.Don

= Erica melanthera =

Species of flowering plant

Erica melanthera, the black-anther heath, is a plant belonging to the genus Erica, and is part of the fynbos. The species is endemic to the Western Cape and the Eastern Cape.
