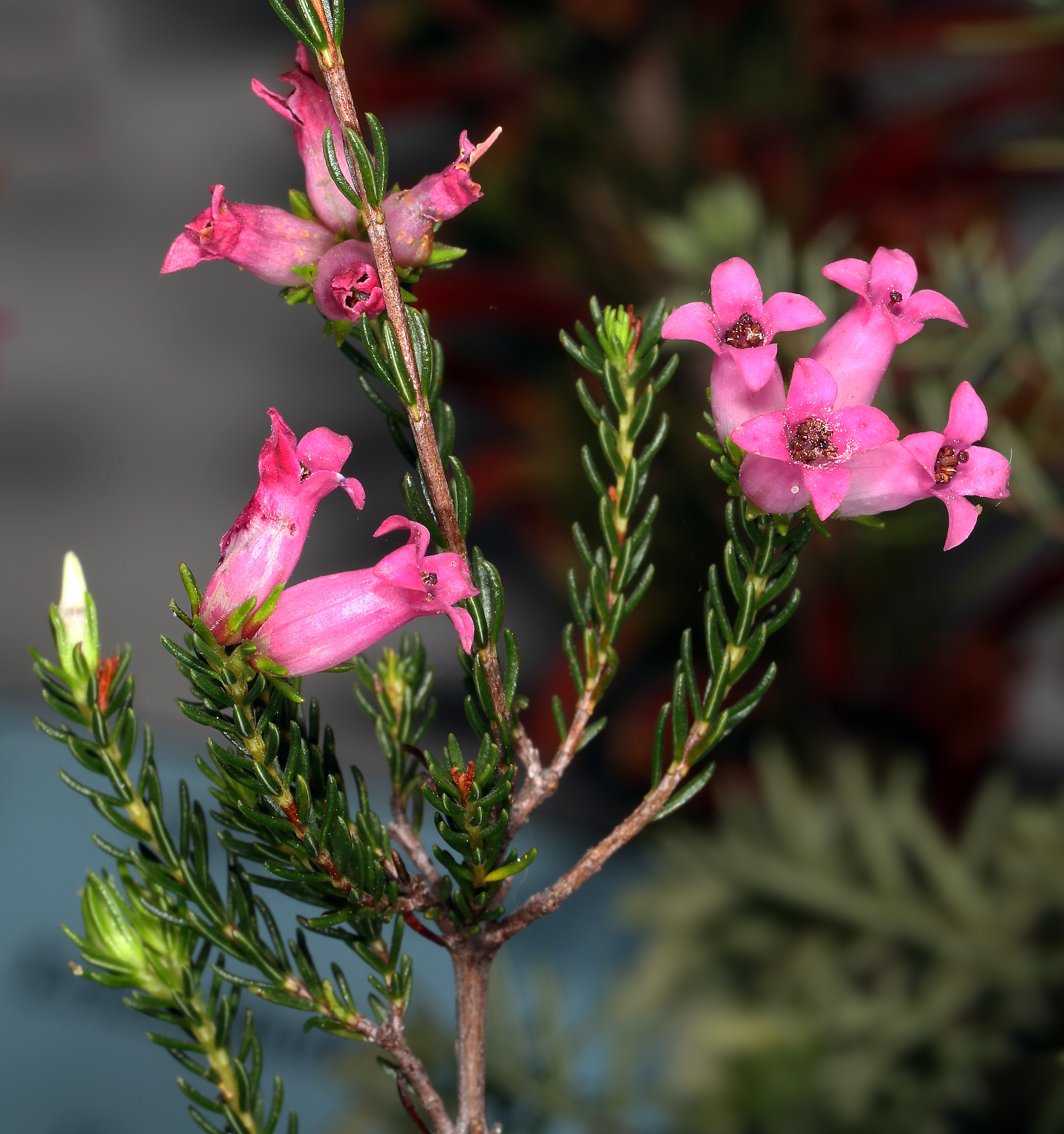

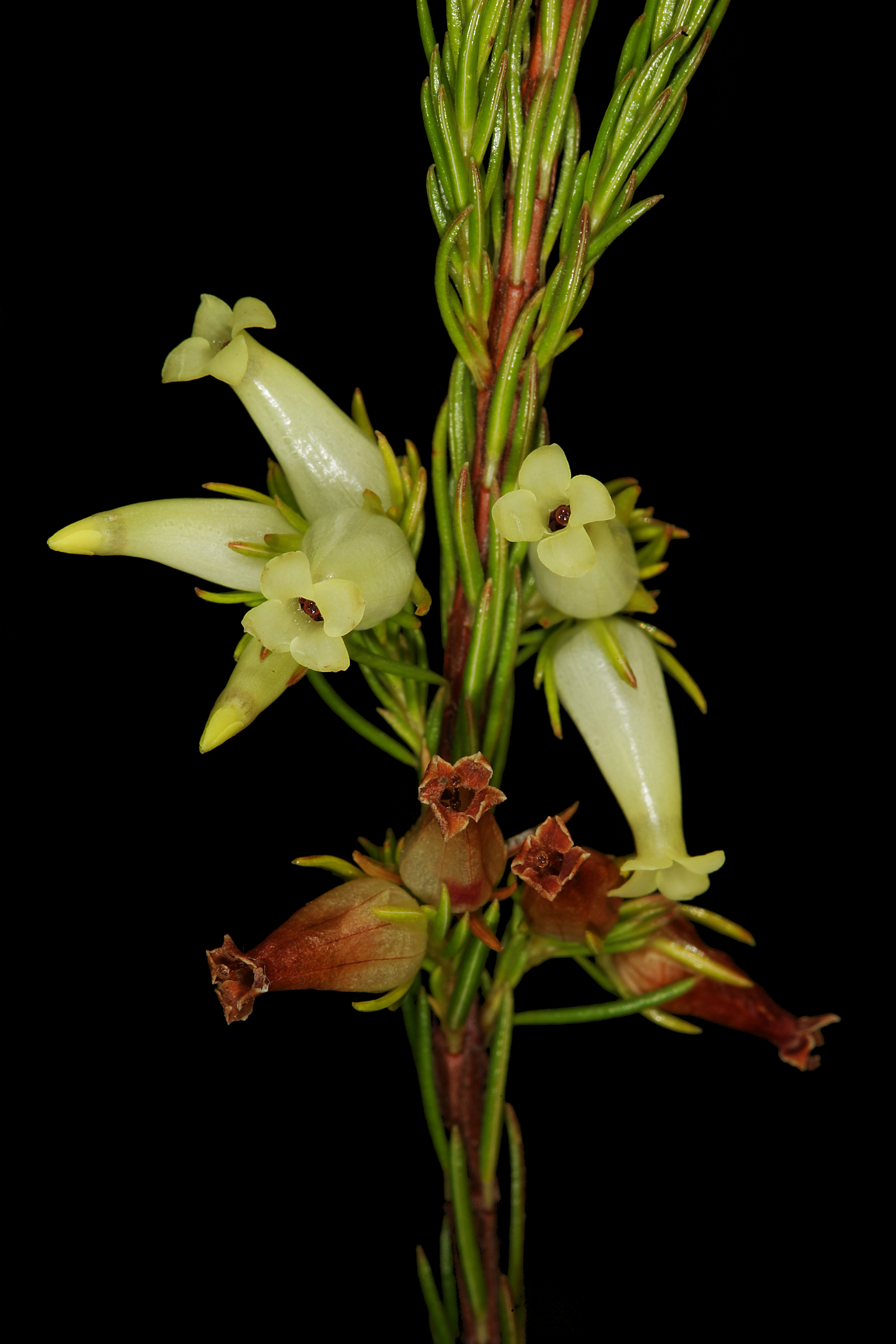

Scientific classification
- Kingdom: Plantae
- Clade: Tracheophytes
- Clade: Angiosperms
- Clade: Eudicots
- Clade: Asterids
- Order: Ericales
- Family: Ericaceae
- Genus: Erica
- Species: E. daphniflora

Binomial name
- Erica daphniflora Salisb., (1802)

Synonyms
- Callista daphniflora G.Don; Erica bartlingiana Klotzsch; Erica incerta KIotzsch; Erica indigesta Klotzsch; Ericoides bartlingianum (Klotzsch) Kuntze; Ericoides daphniflorum (Salisb.) Kuntze

= Erica daphniflora =

Species of flowering plant

Erica daphniflora is a plant belonging to the genus Erica and forming part of the fynbos. The species is endemic to the Western Cape.
