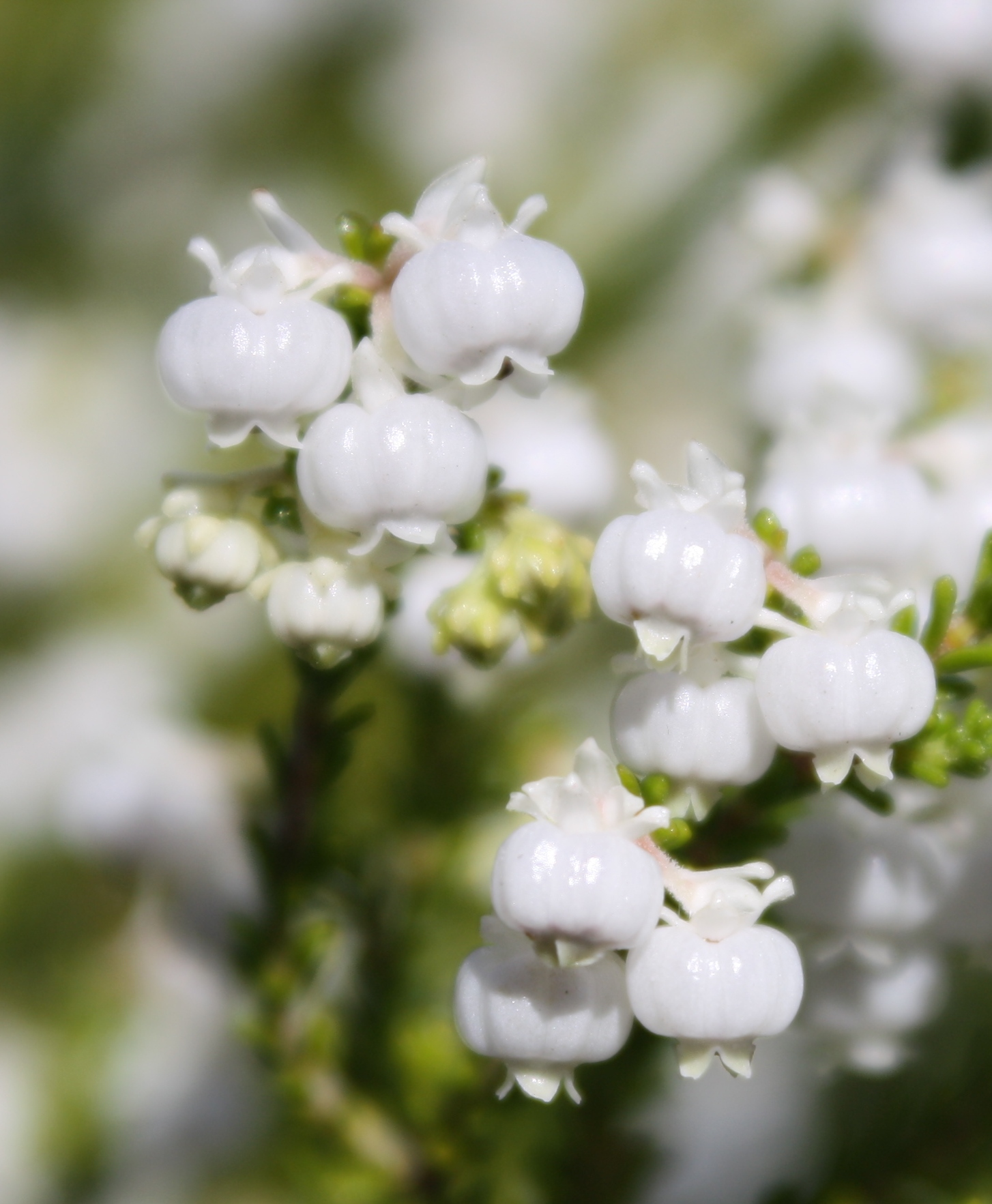

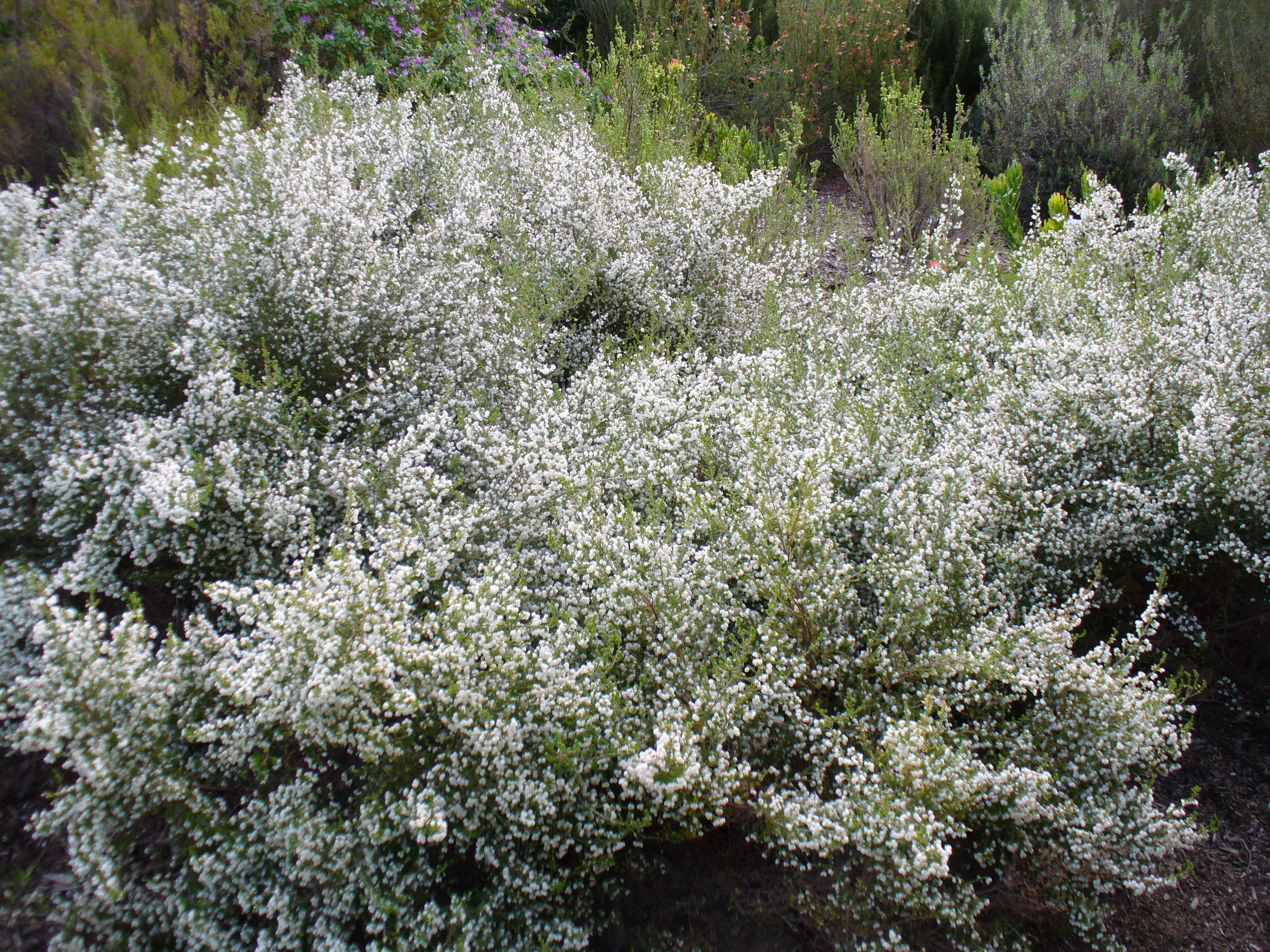

Scientific classification
- Kingdom: Plantae
- Clade: Tracheophytes
- Clade: Angiosperms
- Clade: Eudicots
- Clade: Asterids
- Order: Ericales
- Family: Ericaceae
- Genus: Erica
- Species: E. formosa

Binomial name
- Erica formosa Thunb., (1785)

Synonyms
- Erica grandinosa G.Lodd.; Erica quadrata G.Lodd.; Ericoides formosum (Thunb.) Kuntze; Pachysa formosa G.Don

= Erica formosa =

Species of flowering plant

Erica formosa, the white heath, is a plant that belongs to the genus Erica and forms part of the fynbos. The species is endemic to the Western Cape.
