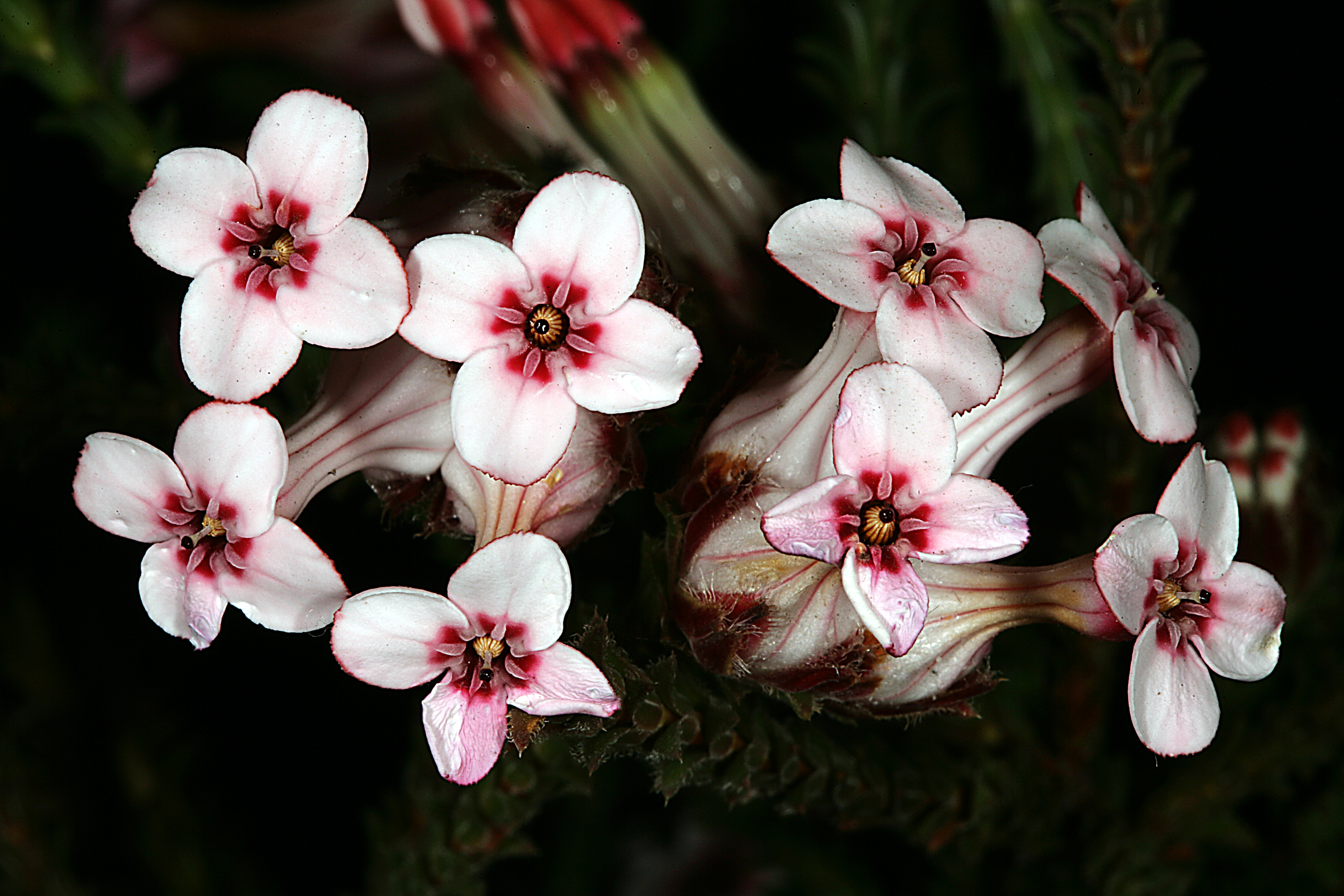

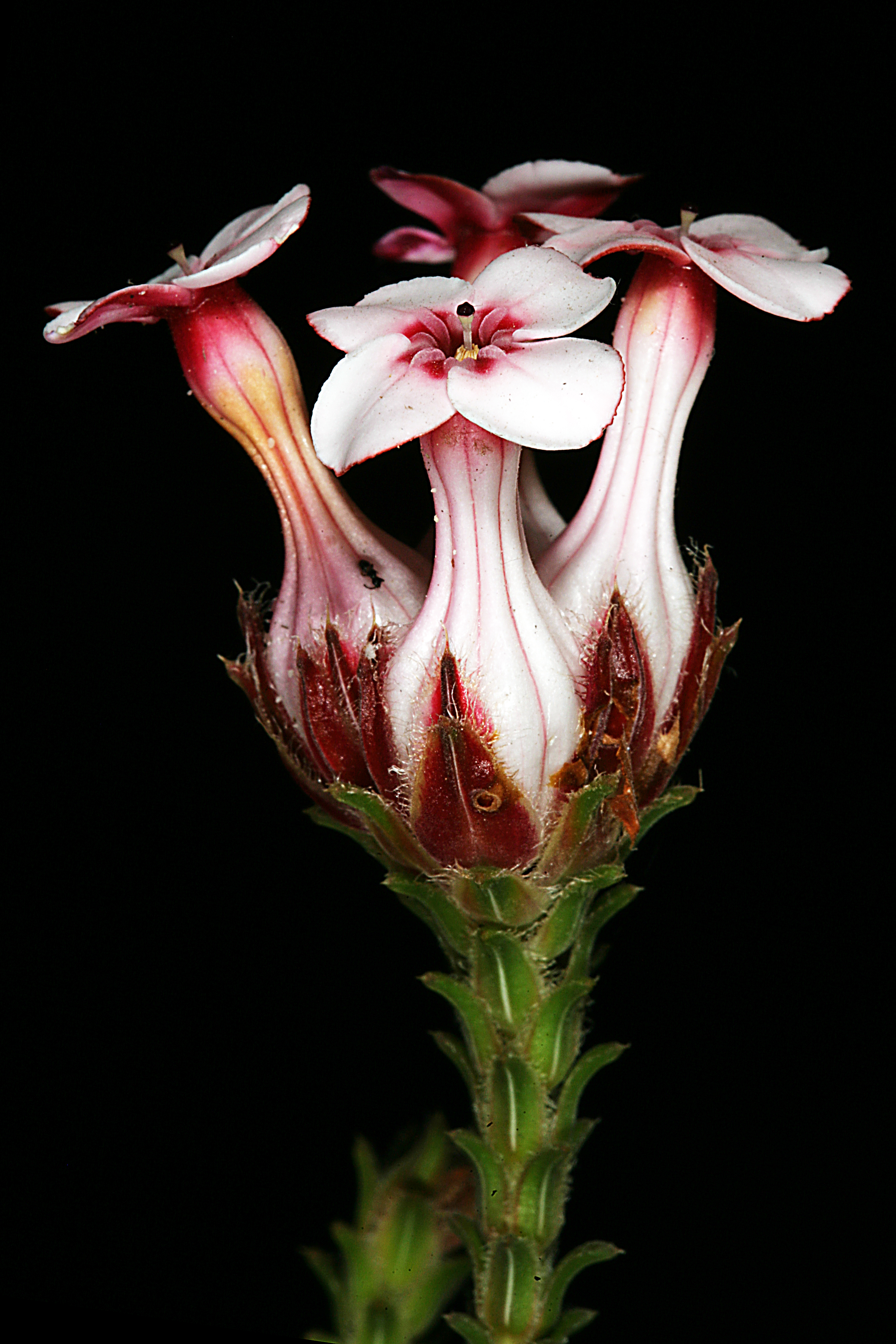

Scientific classification
- Kingdom: Plantae
- Clade: Tracheophytes
- Clade: Angiosperms
- Clade: Eudicots
- Clade: Asterids
- Order: Ericales
- Family: Ericaceae
- Genus: Erica
- Species: E. ampullacea

Binomial name
- Erica ampullacea Curtis

Synonyms
- Erica ampullacea Tratt. ex Tausch; Erica ampulliformis Salisb.; Erica andrewsiana Tausch; Ericoides ampullaceum (Curtis) Kuntze; Euryloma ampullacea G.Don

= Erica ampullacea =

Species of flowering plant

Erica ampullacea, the flask heath, bottle heath and heath sissie, is a plant belonging to the genus Erica and forming part of the fynbos. The species is endemic to the Western Cape.
