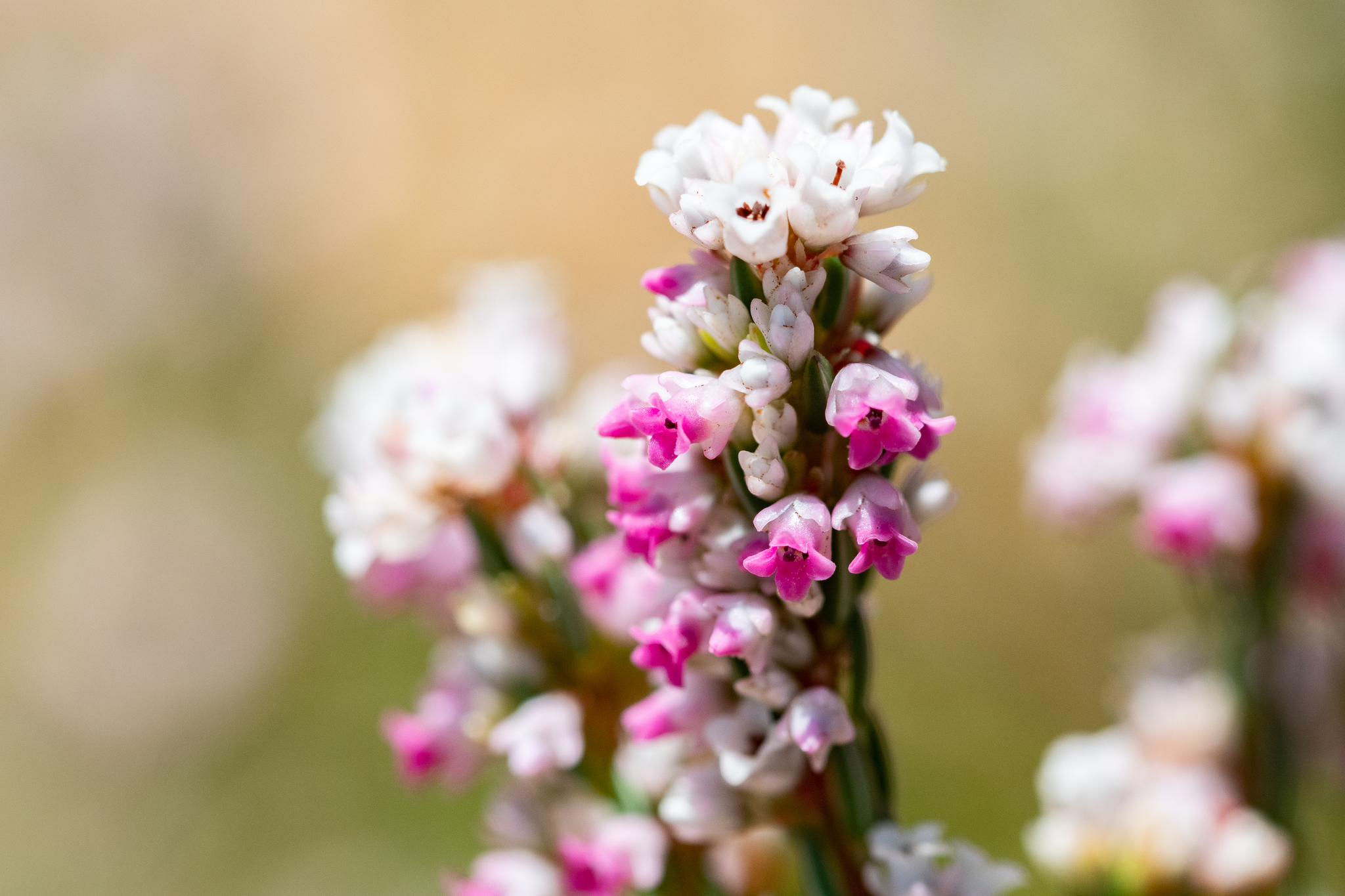

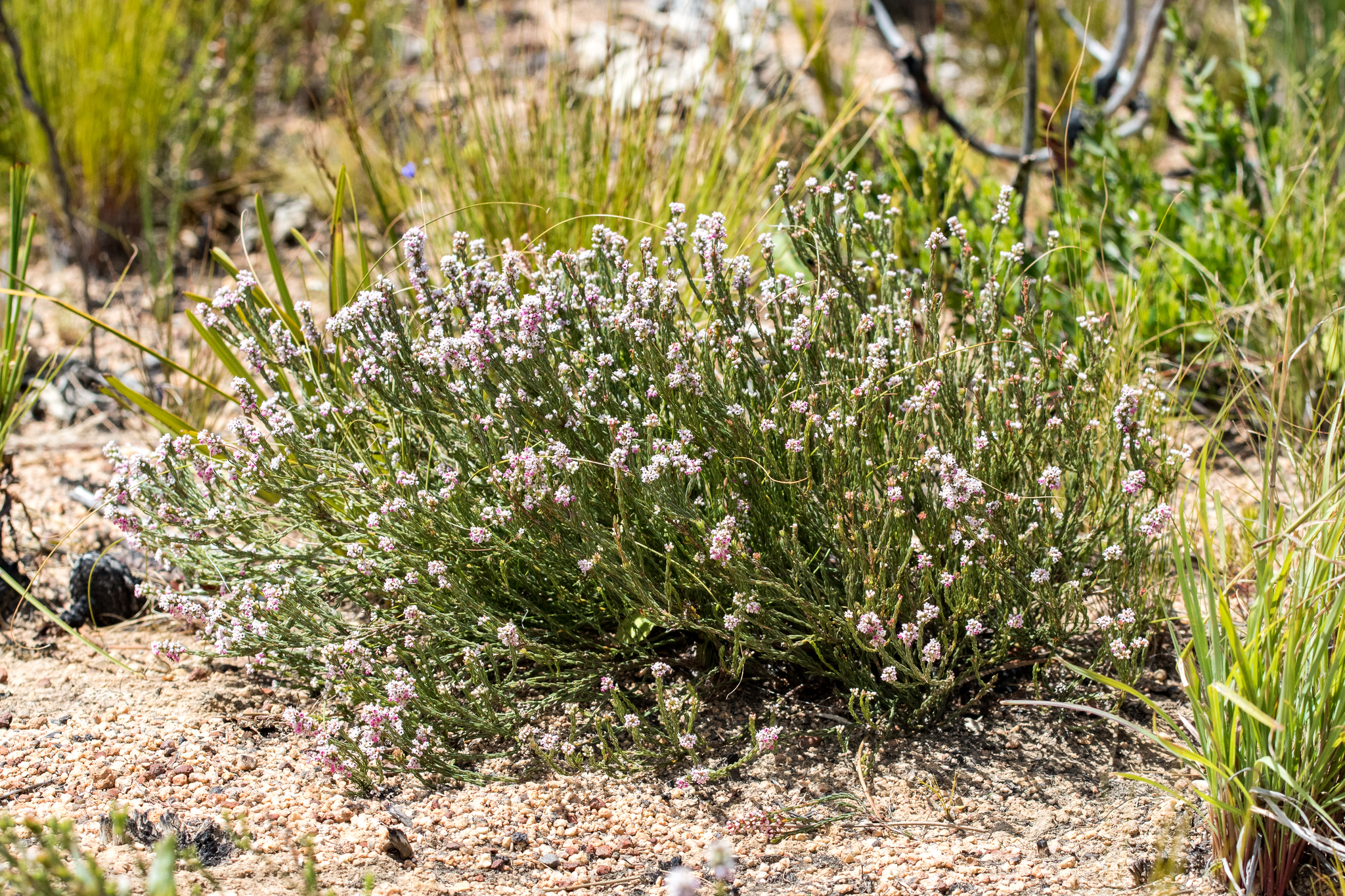

Scientific classification
- Kingdom: Plantae
- Clade: Tracheophytes
- Clade: Angiosperms
- Clade: Eudicots
- Clade: Asterids
- Order: Ericales
- Family: Ericaceae
- Genus: Erica
- Species: E. articularis

Binomial name
- Erica articularis L.,(1767)

Synonyms
- Ericoides articulare (L.) Kuntze

= Erica articularis =

Coppice Heath

Species of flowering plant

Erica articularis, the coppice heath, is a plant that belongs to the genus Erica and forms part of the fynbos. The species is endemic to the Eastern and Western Cape.
