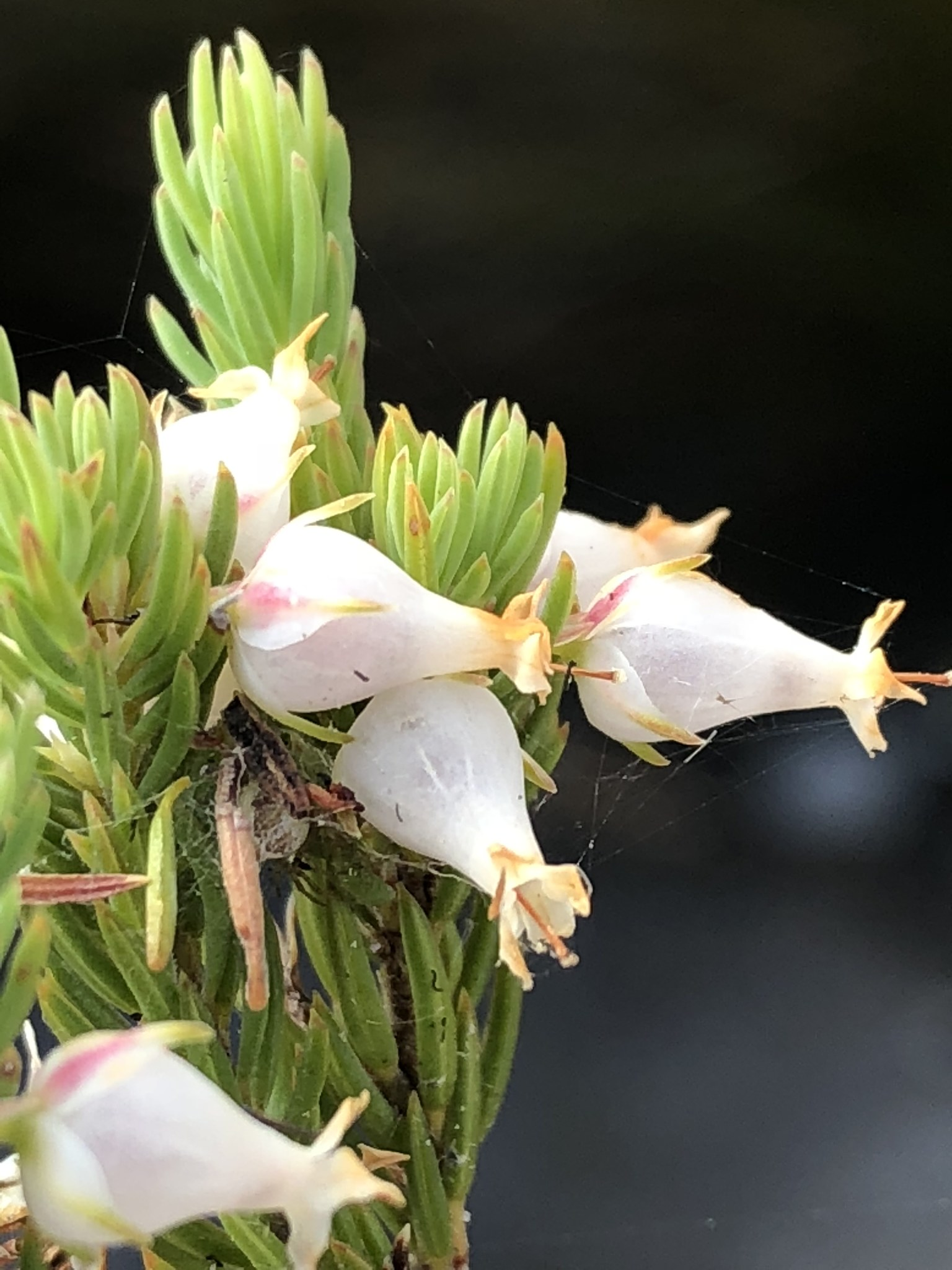

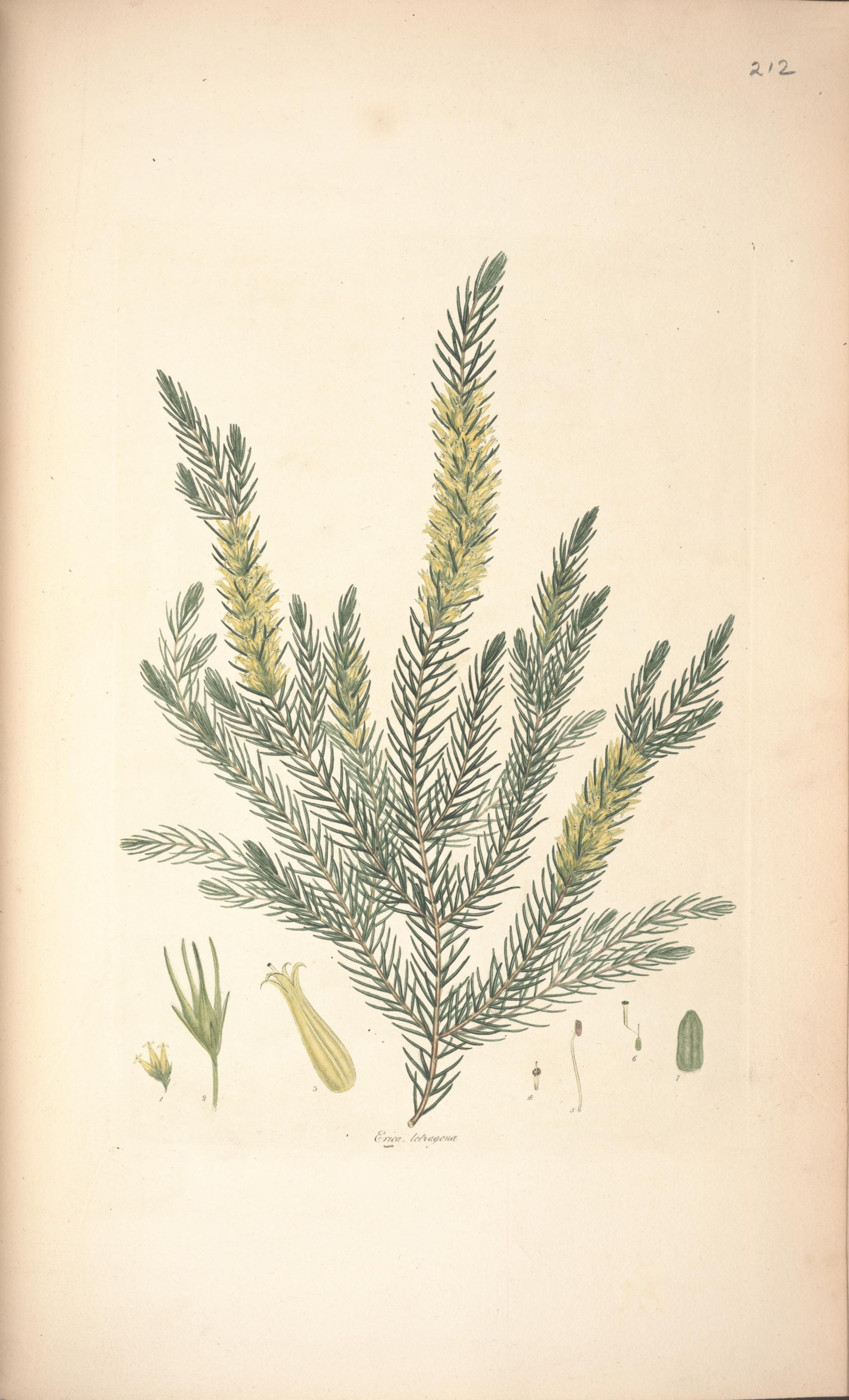

Scientific classification
- Kingdom: Plantae
- Clade: Tracheophytes
- Clade: Angiosperms
- Clade: Eudicots
- Clade: Asterids
- Order: Ericales
- Family: Ericaceae
- Genus: Erica
- Species: E. tetragona

Binomial name
- Erica tetragona L.f.

Synonyms
- Callista tetragona G.Don; Erica pugionifolia Salisb.; Ericoides tetragonum (L.f.) Kuntze; Eurylepis tetragona G.Don

= Erica tetragona =

Species of flowering plant

Erica tetragona is a plant belonging to the genus Erica. The species is endemic to the Western Cape.
