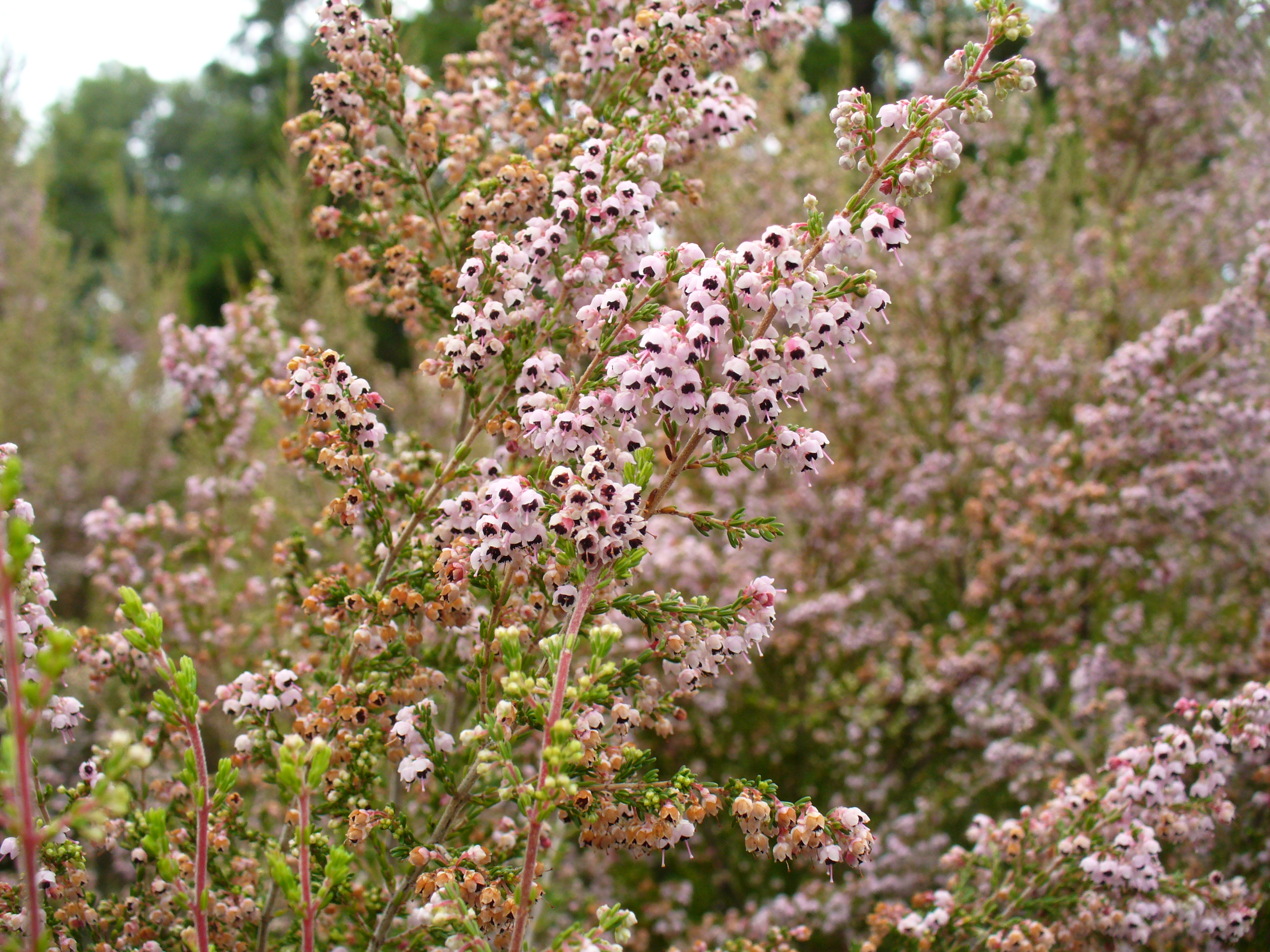

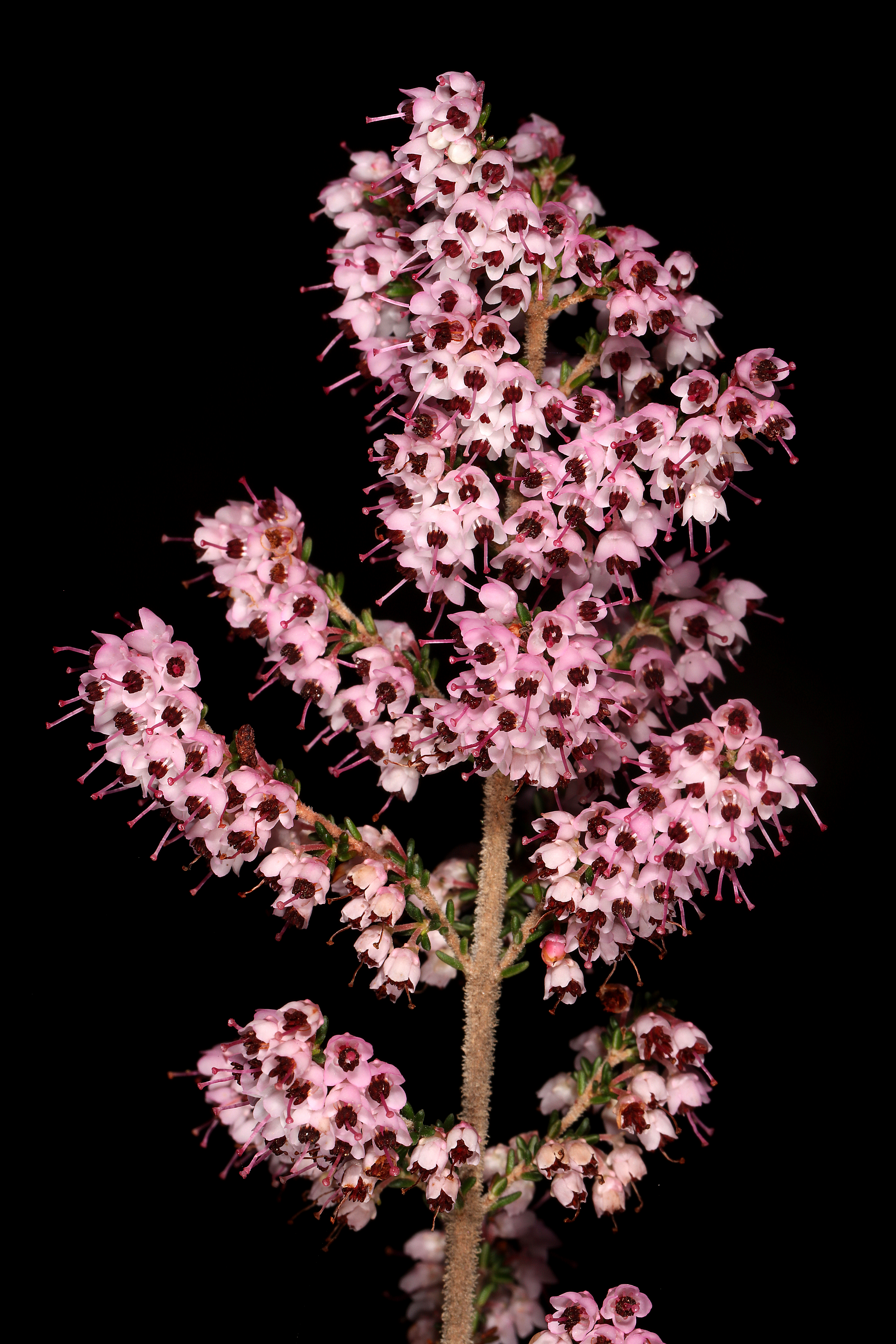

Scientific classification
- Kingdom: Plantae
- Clade: Tracheophytes
- Clade: Angiosperms
- Clade: Eudicots
- Clade: Asterids
- Order: Ericales
- Family: Ericaceae
- Genus: Erica
- Species: E. sparsa

Binomial name
- Erica sparsa Sinclair

Synonyms
- Erica galiiflora Bartl.; Erica macrostoma Klotzsch ex Benth.; Ericoides floribundum Kuntze

= Erica sparsa =

Species of flowering plant

Erica sparsa is a plant belonging to the genus Erica. The species is endemic to the Eastern Cape and Western Cape.
