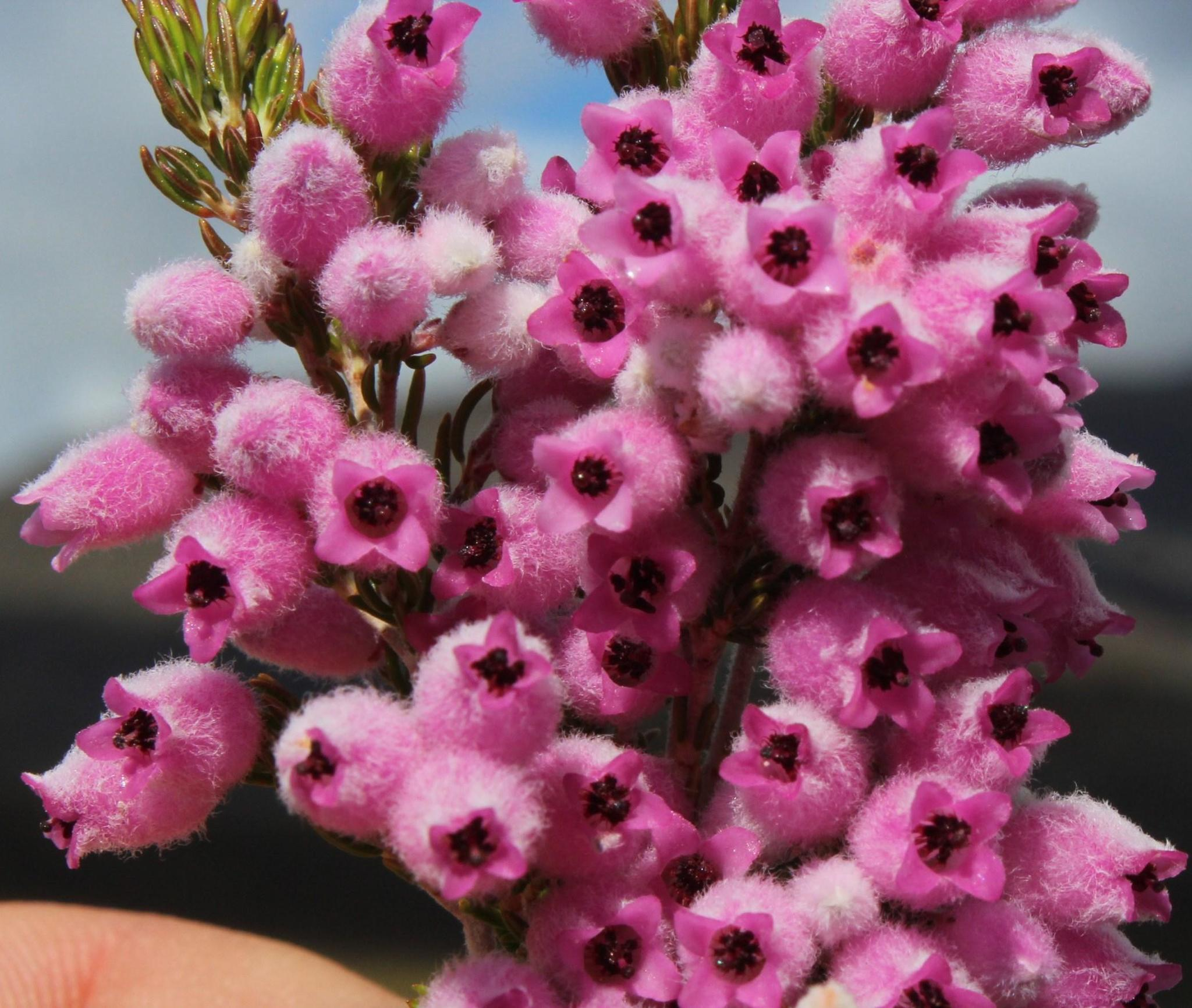

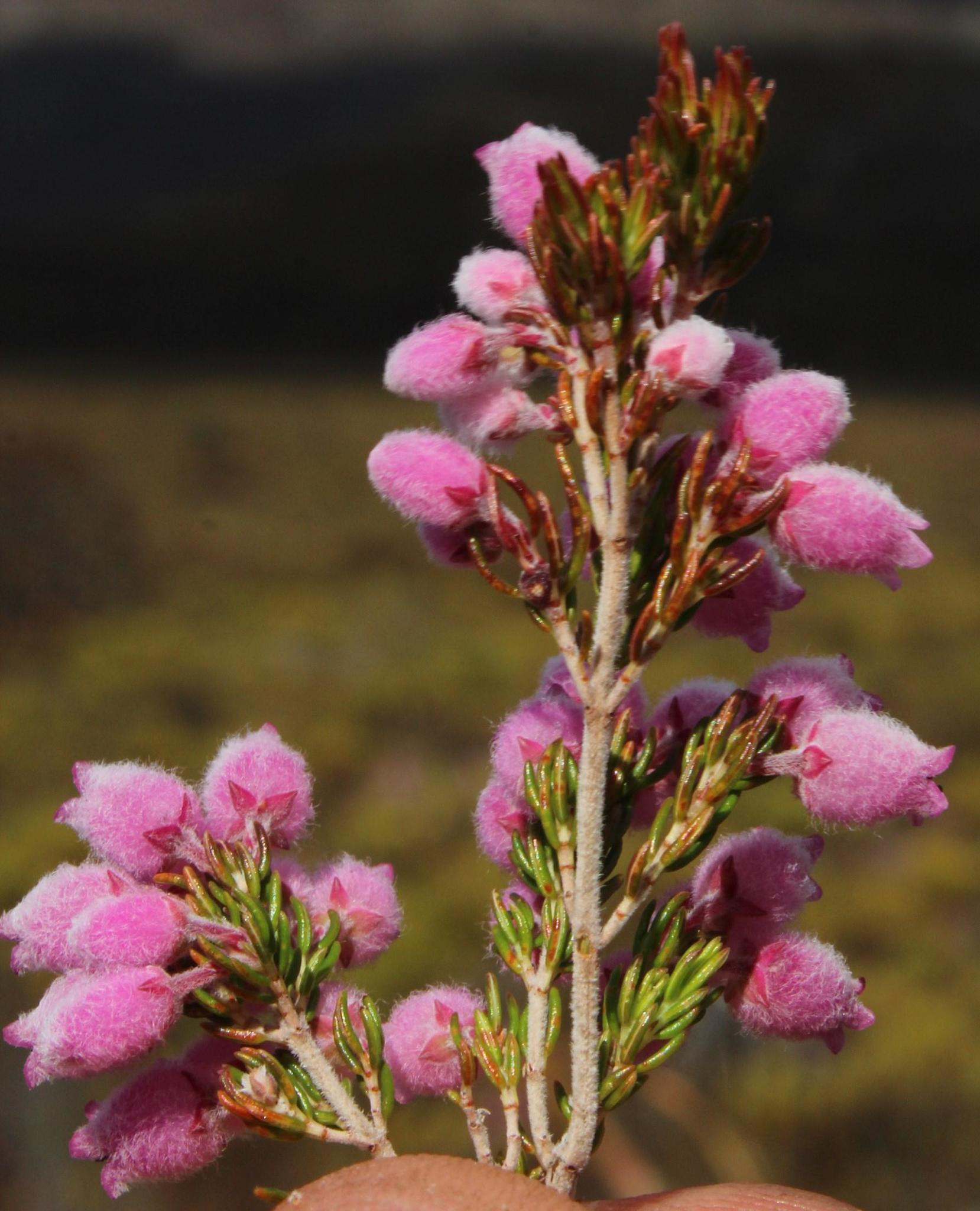

Scientific classification
- Kingdom: Plantae
- Clade: Tracheophytes
- Clade: Angiosperms
- Clade: Eudicots
- Clade: Asterids
- Order: Ericales
- Family: Ericaceae
- Genus: Erica
- Species: E. ovina

Binomial name
- Erica ovina Klotzsch ex Benth.

Synonyms
- Ericoides ovinum (Klotzsch ex Benth.) Kuntze

= Erica ovina =

Species of flowering plant

Erica ovina is a plant belonging to the genus Erica and is part of the fynbos. The species is endemic to the Western Cape.
