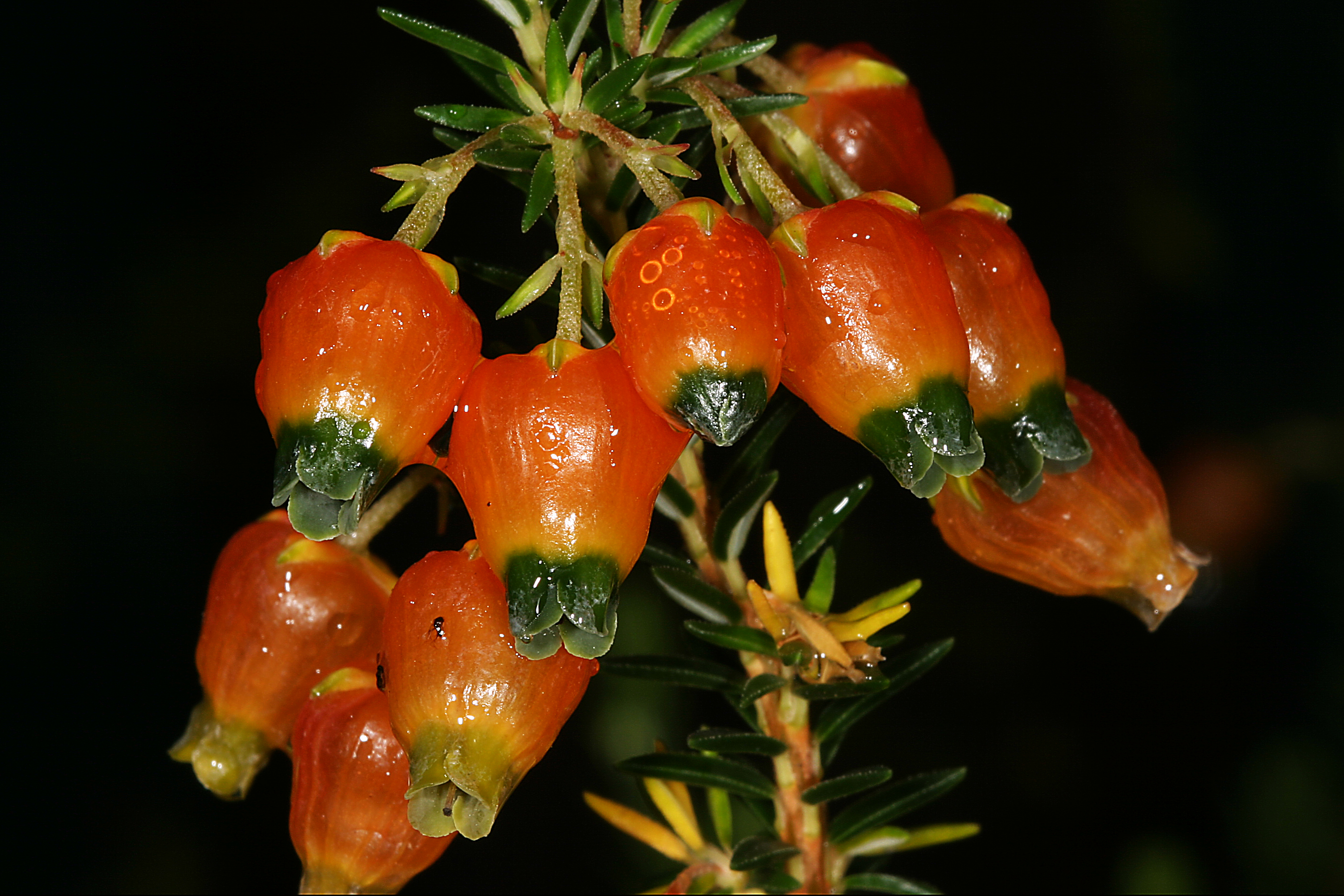

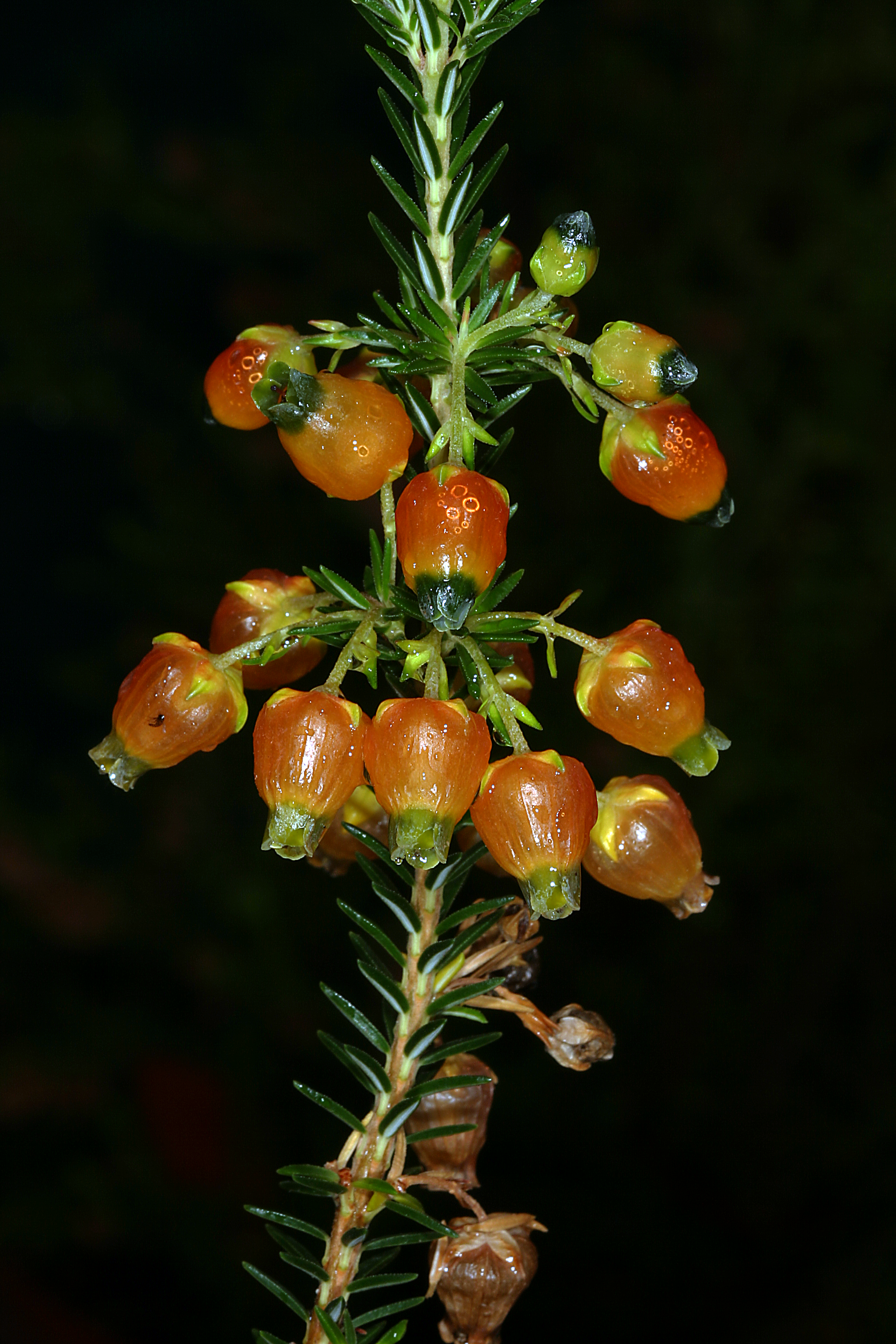

Scientific classification
- Kingdom: Plantae
- Clade: Tracheophytes
- Clade: Angiosperms
- Clade: Eudicots
- Clade: Asterids
- Order: Ericales
- Family: Ericaceae
- Genus: Erica
- Species: E. blenna

Binomial name
- Erica blenna Salisb., (1802)

Synonyms
- Ericoides blennum (Salisb.) Kuntze

= Erica blenna =

Species of flowering plant

Erica blenna, the orange heath, Riversdale heath and lantern heath, is a plant belonging to the genus Erica and forming part of the fynbos. The species is endemic to the Western Cape.
