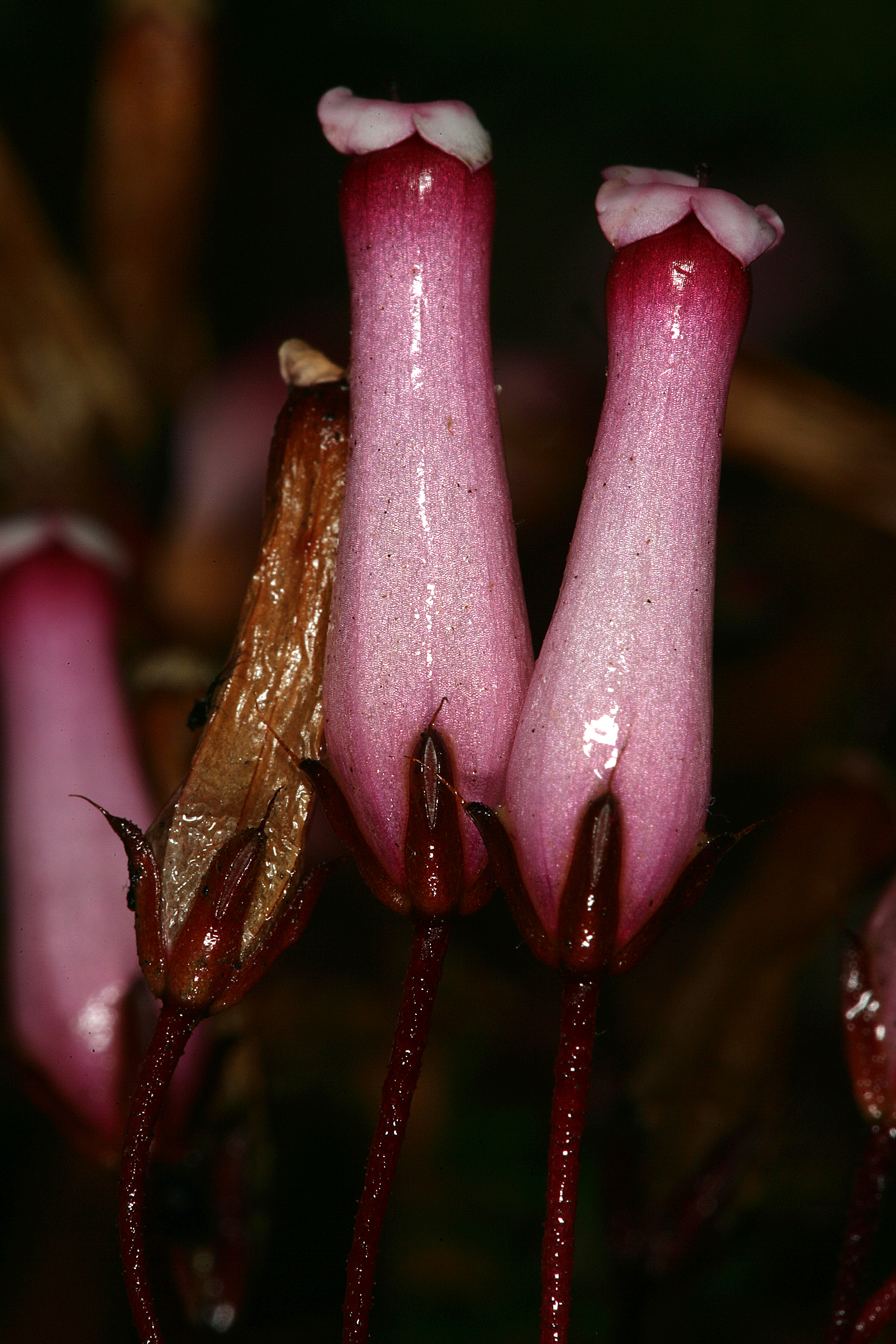

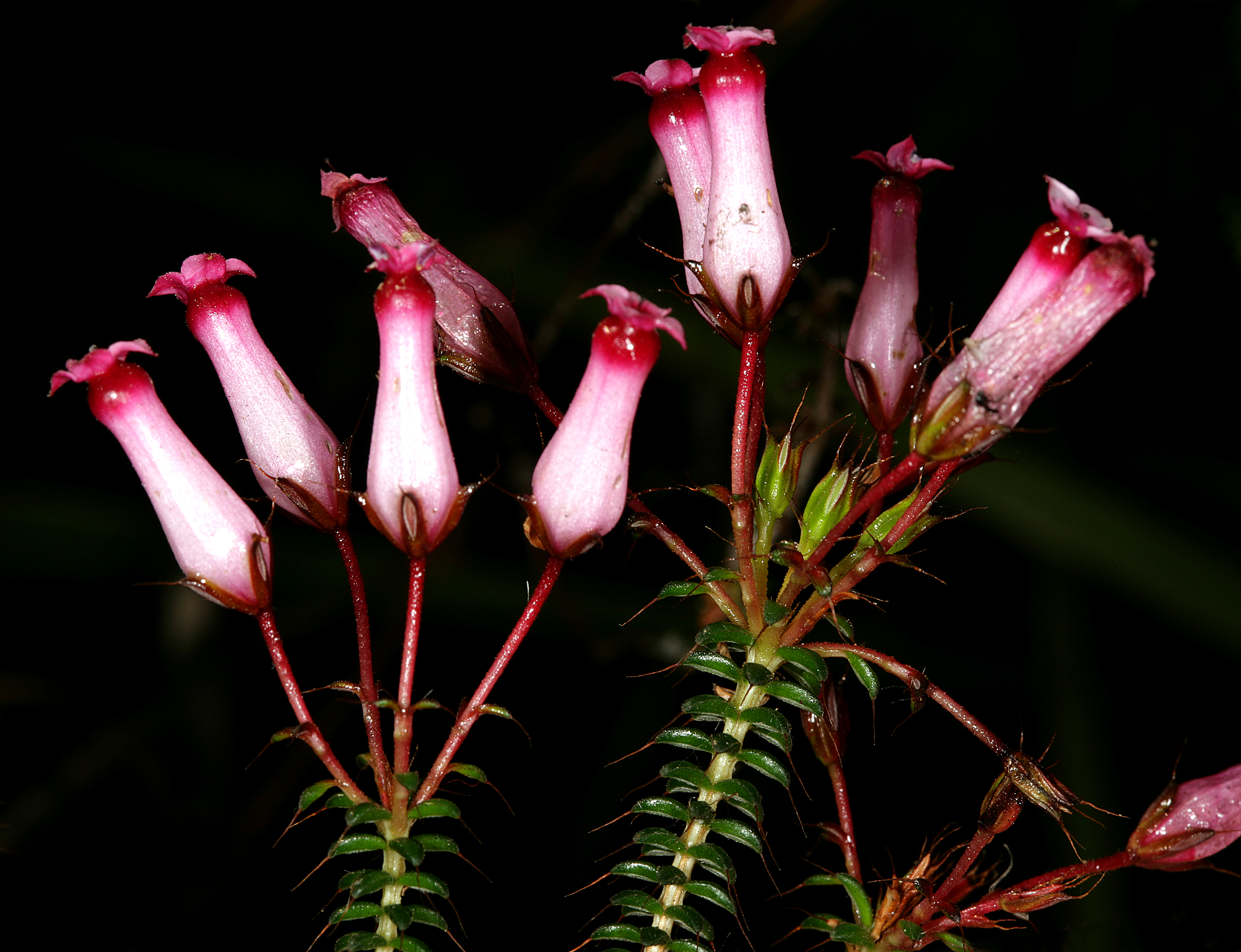

Scientific classification
- Kingdom: Plantae
- Clade: Tracheophytes
- Clade: Angiosperms
- Clade: Eudicots
- Clade: Asterids
- Order: Ericales
- Family: Ericaceae
- Genus: Erica
- Species: E. retorta

Binomial name
- Erica retorta L.f., (1774)

Synonyms
- Erica gorteriifolia Salisb.; Ericoides retortum (L.f.) Kuntze; Euryloma retorta G.Don

= Erica retorta =

Species of flowering plant

Erica retorta is a plant belonging to the genus Erica. The species is endemic to the Western Cape.
