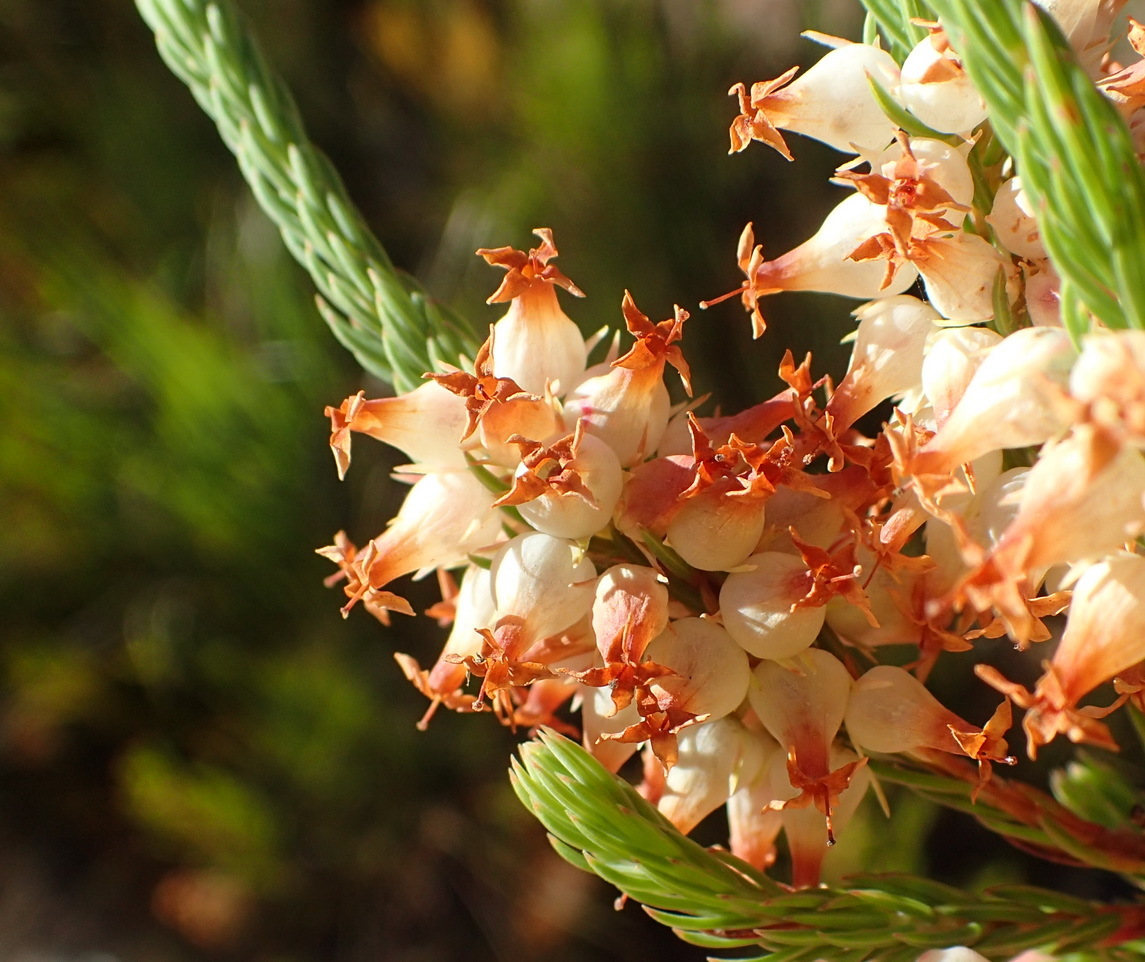

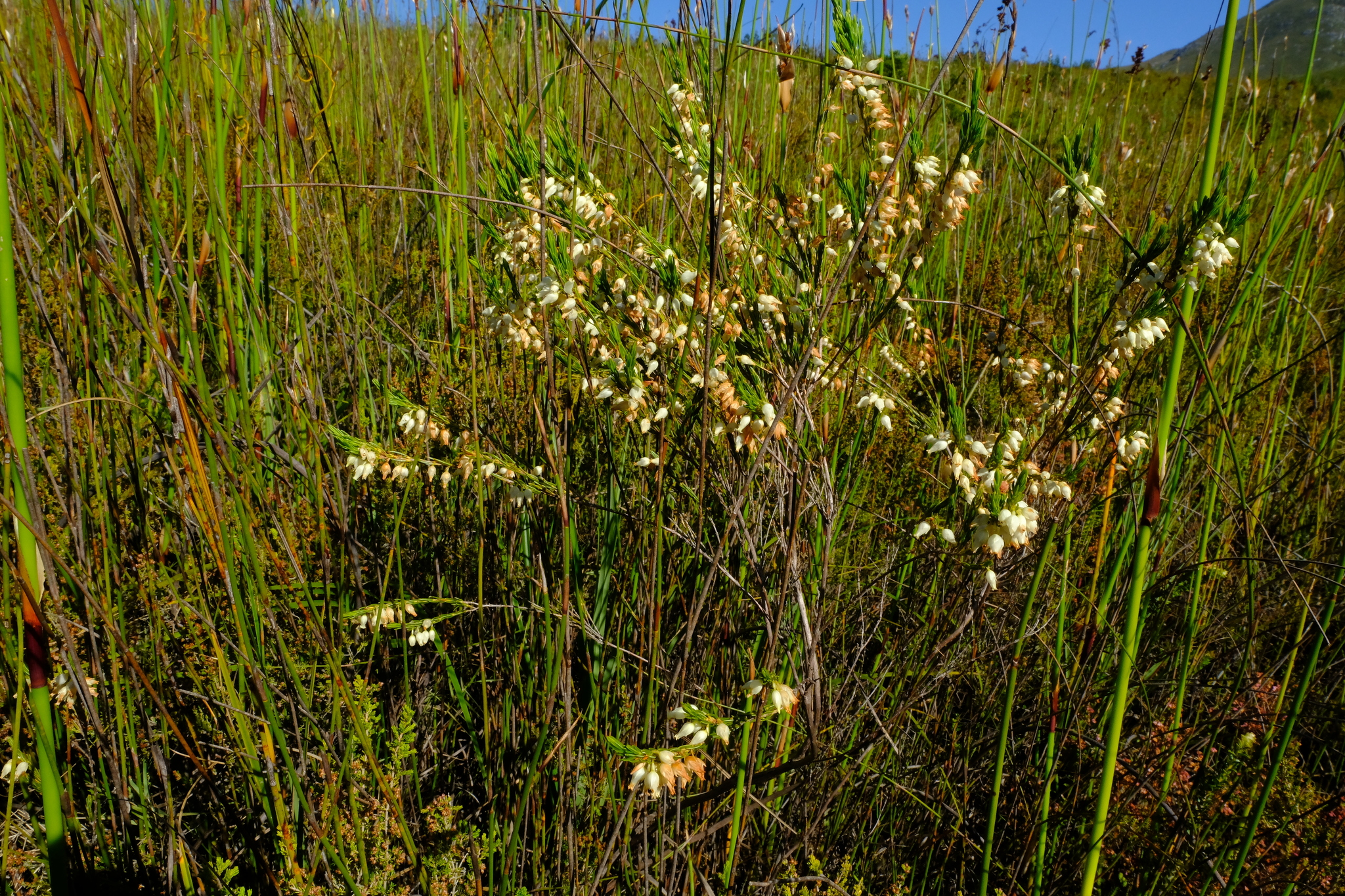

Scientific classification
- Kingdom: Plantae
- Clade: Tracheophytes
- Clade: Angiosperms
- Clade: Eudicots
- Clade: Asterids
- Order: Ericales
- Family: Ericaceae
- Genus: Erica
- Species: E. albens

Binomial name
- Erica albens L., (1771)

Synonyms
- Erica albida Thunb.; Erica viminalis Salisb.; Ericoides albens (L.) Kuntze; Eurylepis albens D.Don

= Erica albens =

Species of flowering plant

Erica albens is a plant belonging to the genus Erica and forming part of the fynbos. The species is endemic to the Western Cape.
