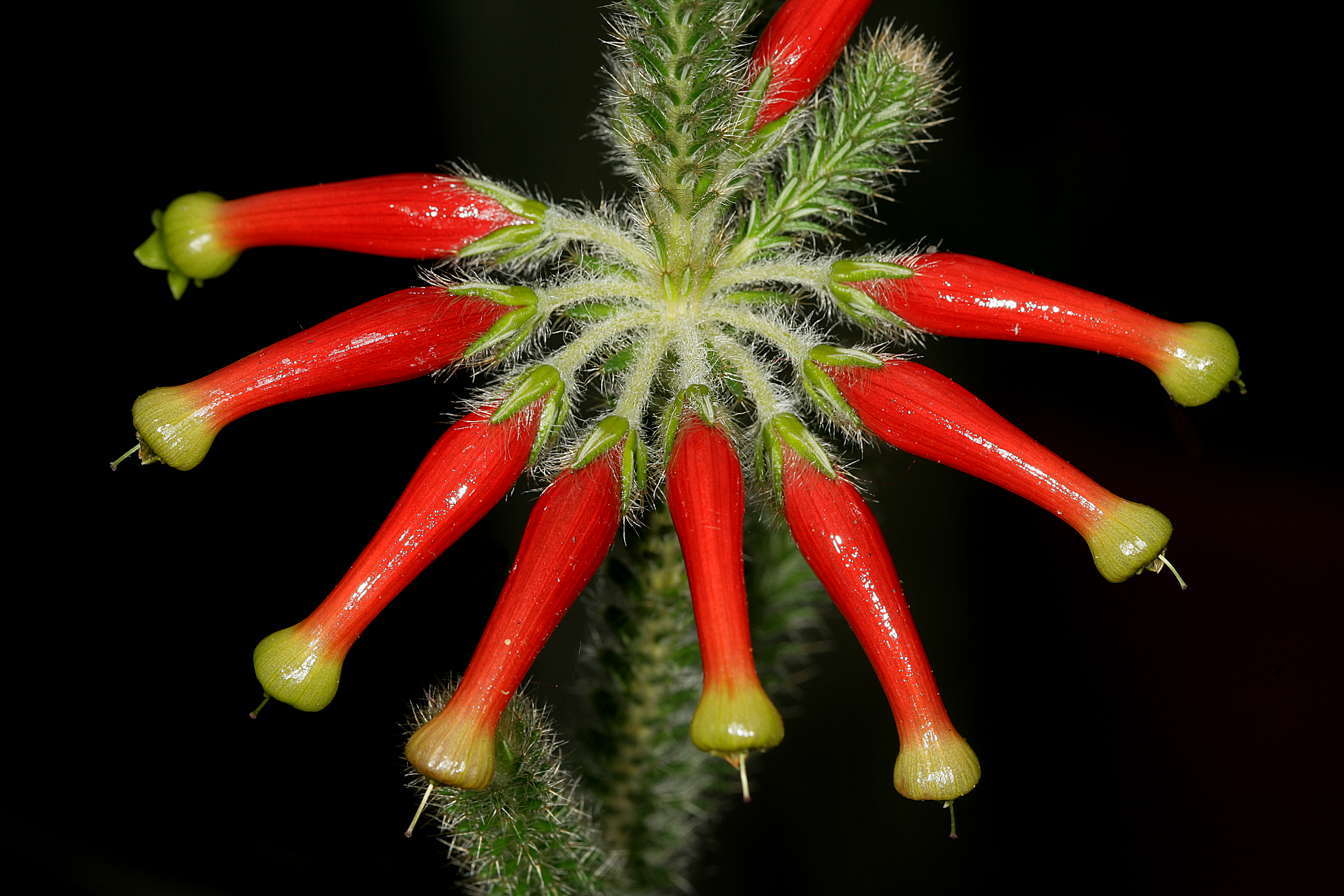

Scientific classification
- Kingdom: Plantae
- Clade: Tracheophytes
- Clade: Angiosperms
- Clade: Eudicots
- Clade: Asterids
- Order: Ericales
- Family: Ericaceae
- Genus: Erica
- Species: E. massonii

Binomial name
- Erica massonii L.f. (1782)

Synonyms
- Callista acuminata G.Don; Callista bedfordiana G.Don; Callista bucciniflora G.Don; Callista calostoma G.Don; Callista magnifica G.Don; Callista metuliflora G.Don; Callista quadrangularis G.Don; Callista rigida (G.Lodd. ex J.Forbes) G.Don; Callista stellifera G.Don; Callista swainsoniana G.Don; Callista templeana G.Don; Callista undulata G.Don; Erica acuminata Andrews; Erica adjuvans Klotzsch; Erica ambigua J.C.Wendl.; Erica andrewsii Klotzsch; Erica bibracteata Klotzsch; Erica bucciniflora Sims; Erica calamiformis Salisb.; Erica culcitiflora Salisb.; Erica cylindrica Andrews; Erica erosa G.Lodd.; Erica hybrida Benth.; Erica lycopodiifolia Salisb.; Erica magnifica Andrews; Erica massonia Andrews; Erica metuliflora Curtis; Erica oblonga J.Forbes; Erica pallida G.Lodd.; Erica patersonioides J.Forbes; Erica perspicua J.Forbes; Erica perspicuoides J.Forbes; Erica princeps Andrews; Erica pseudovestita Benth.; Erica quadrangularis Andrews; Erica radiata Andrews; Erica rubercalyx Andrews; Erica rubrocalyx Gentilh. & Carruth.; Erica rubrosepala Sweet; Erica rugosa Andrews; Erica spuria Andrews; Erica stellifera Andrews; Erica swainsonia Andrews; Erica templea J.Lee ex Andrews; Erica translucens Andrews; Erica tubulosa J.C.Wendl.; Erica undulata Andrews; Erica westphalingia Benth.; Ericoides carinatum (G.Lodd.) Kuntze; Ericoides massonii (L.f.) Kuntze; Eurylepis massonii D.Don; Euryloma oblonga G.Don; Euryloma princeps G.Don; Syringodea acuminata Steud.; Syringodea ambigua G.Don; Syringodea carinata (Sinclair) G.Don; Syringodea hybrida G.Don; Syringodea lycopodiifolia (Salisb.) D.Don ex Steud.; Syringodea massonii (L.f.) G.Don; Syringodea patersonioides (J.Forbes) G.Don; Syringodea perspicua G.Don; Syringodea radiata (Andrews) G.Don; Syringodea rubida G.Don; Syringodea rugosa (Andrews) G.Don; Syringodea spuria (Andrews) G.Don

= Erica massonii =

Species of flowering plant

Erica massonii, or Masson's heath, is a plant that belongs to the genus Erica and is part of the fynbos. The species is endemic to the Western Cape.
