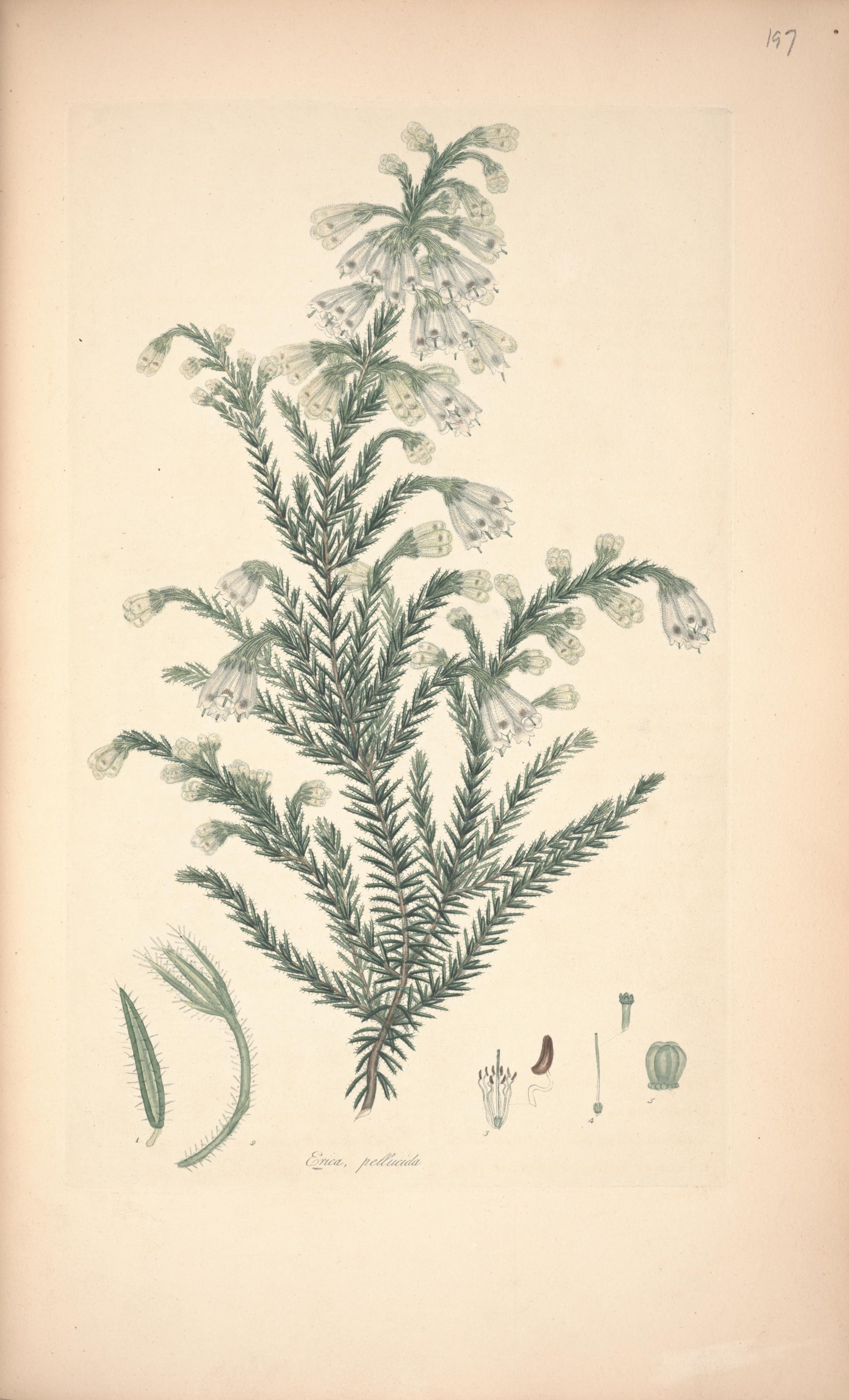

Scientific classification
- Kingdom: Plantae
- Clade: Tracheophytes
- Clade: Angiosperms
- Clade: Eudicots
- Clade: Asterids
- Order: Ericales
- Family: Ericaceae
- Genus: Erica
- Species: E. pellucida

Binomial name
- Erica pellucida Sol. ex Salisb.

Synonyms
- Callista parmentieri (G.Lodd. ex Sinclair) G.Don; Callista pellucida (Sol. ex Salisb.) G.Don; Callista venusta G.Don; Erica dentata J.C.Wendl.; Erica exudans Andrews; Erica pellucidioides J.Forbes; Ericoides pellucidum (Sol. ex Salisb.) Kuntze; Syringodea exposita (G.Lodd. ex J.Forbes) G.Don; Syringodea exudans (Andrews) G.Don; Syringodea pellucida (Sol. ex Salisb.) G.Don

= Erica pellucida =

Species of flowering plant

Erica pellucida is a plant belonging to the genus Erica and is part of the fynbos. The species is endemic to the Western Cape.
