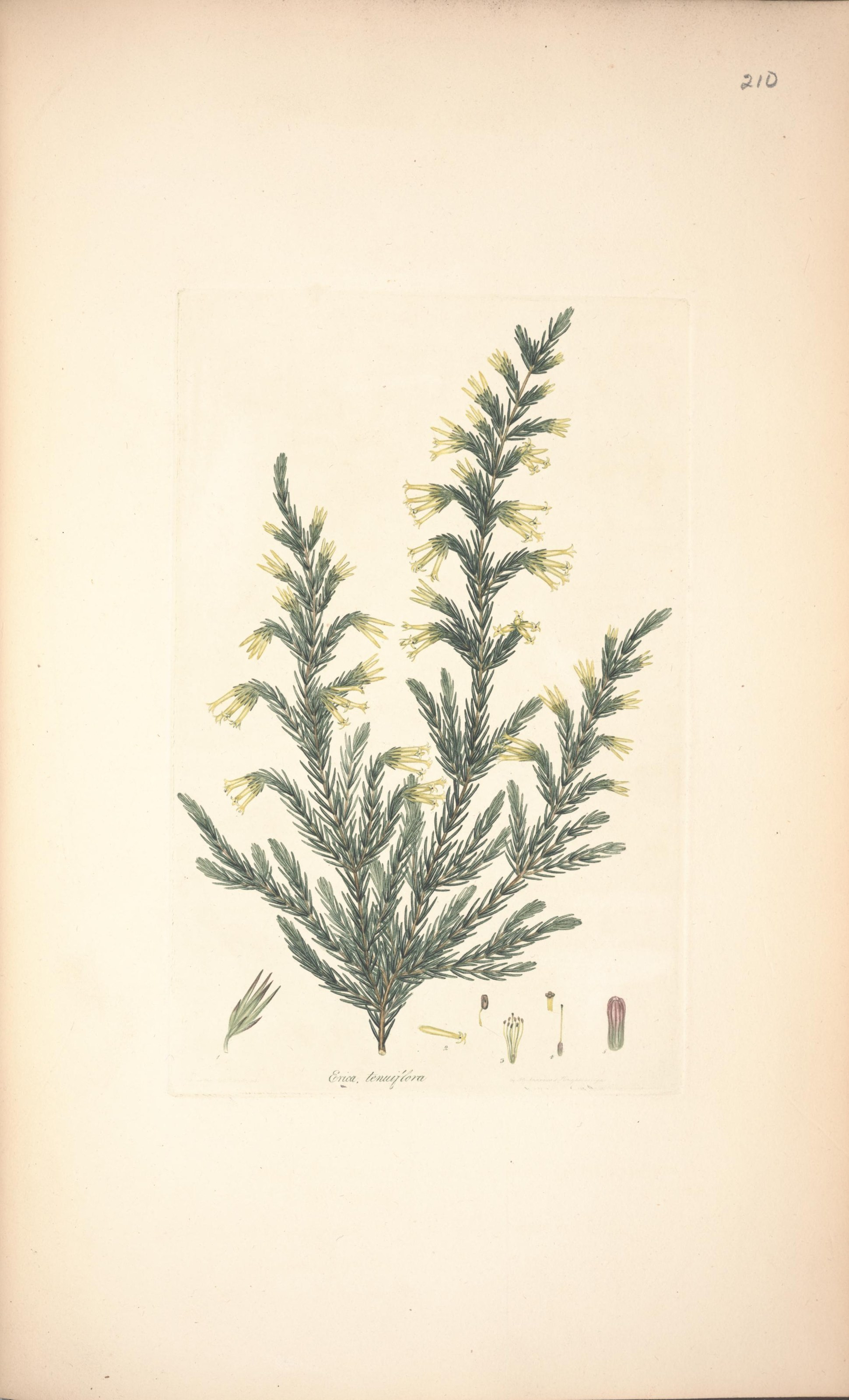

Scientific classification
- Kingdom: Plantae
- Clade: Tracheophytes
- Clade: Angiosperms
- Clade: Eudicots
- Clade: Asterids
- Order: Ericales
- Family: Ericaceae
- Genus: Erica
- Species: E. cylindrica

Binomial name
- Erica cylindrica Thunb., (1785)

Synonyms
- Callista cliffordiana (G.Lodd. ex Sinclair) G.Don; Callista tenuiflora (Andrews) G.Don; Erica fistuliflora Salisb.; Erica stenantha Sweet; Erica tenuiflora Andrews; Ericoides cylindricum Kuntze; Ericoides tenuiflorum (Andrews) Kuntze

= Erica cylindrica =

Species of flowering plant

Erica cylindrica, the cylinder heath, is a plant belonging to the genus Erica and forming part of the fynbos. The species is endemic to the Western Cape.
