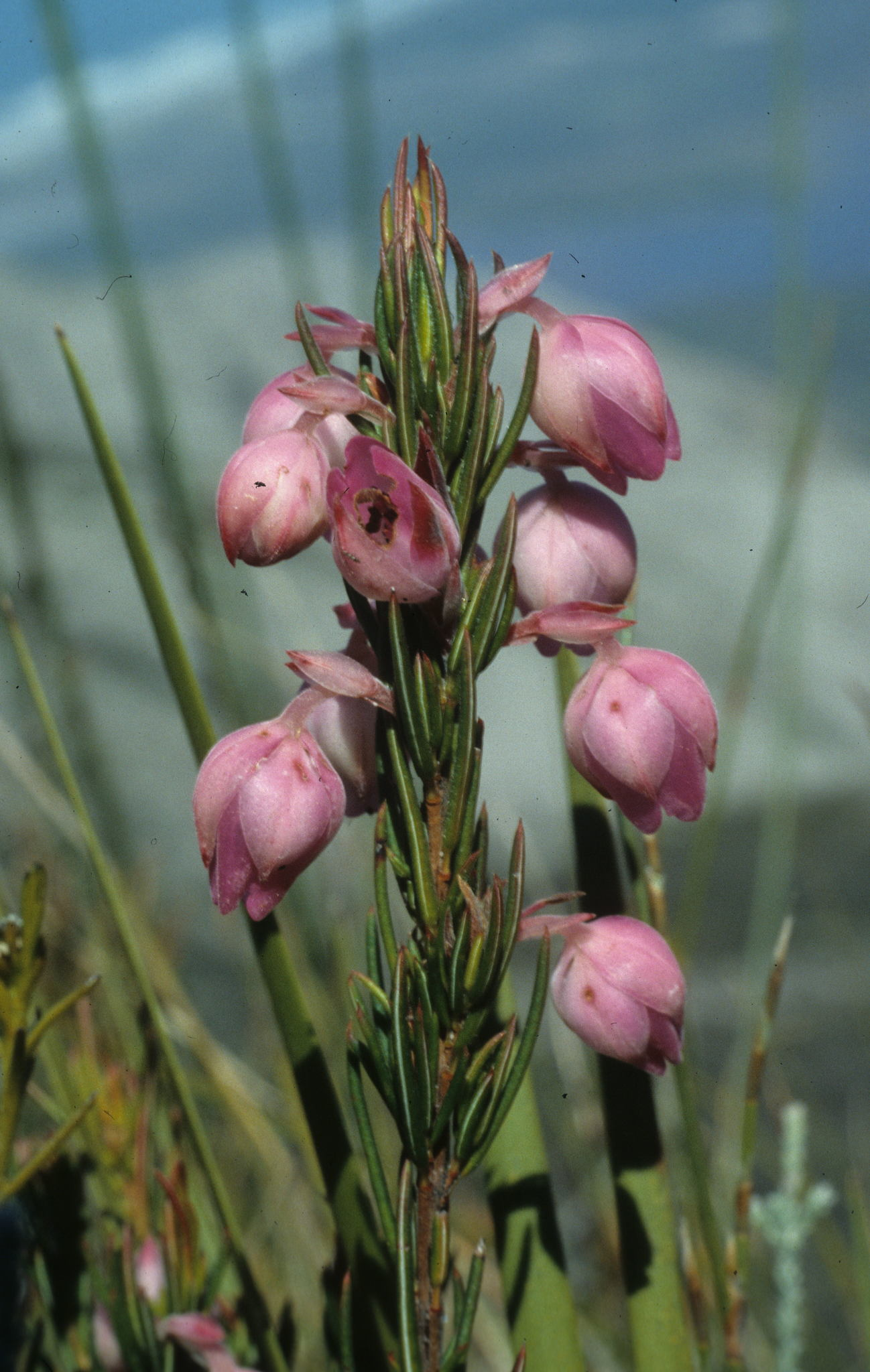

Scientific classification
- Kingdom: Plantae
- Clade: Tracheophytes
- Clade: Angiosperms
- Clade: Eudicots
- Clade: Asterids
- Order: Ericales
- Family: Ericaceae
- Genus: Erica
- Species: E. holosericea

Binomial name
- Erica holosericea Salisb.

Synonyms
- Erica andromediflora Andrews; Erica andromediflora var. triumphans Sims; Erica pomifera Benth.; Ericoides andromediflorum (Andrews) Kuntze; Eurystegia andromediflora (Andrews) D.Don; Eurystegia pomifera D.Don; Eurystegia triumphans G.Don; Lamprotis holosericea G.Don

= Erica holosericea =

Species of flowering plant

Erica holosericea is a plant belonging to the genus Erica. The species is endemic to the Western Cape.
