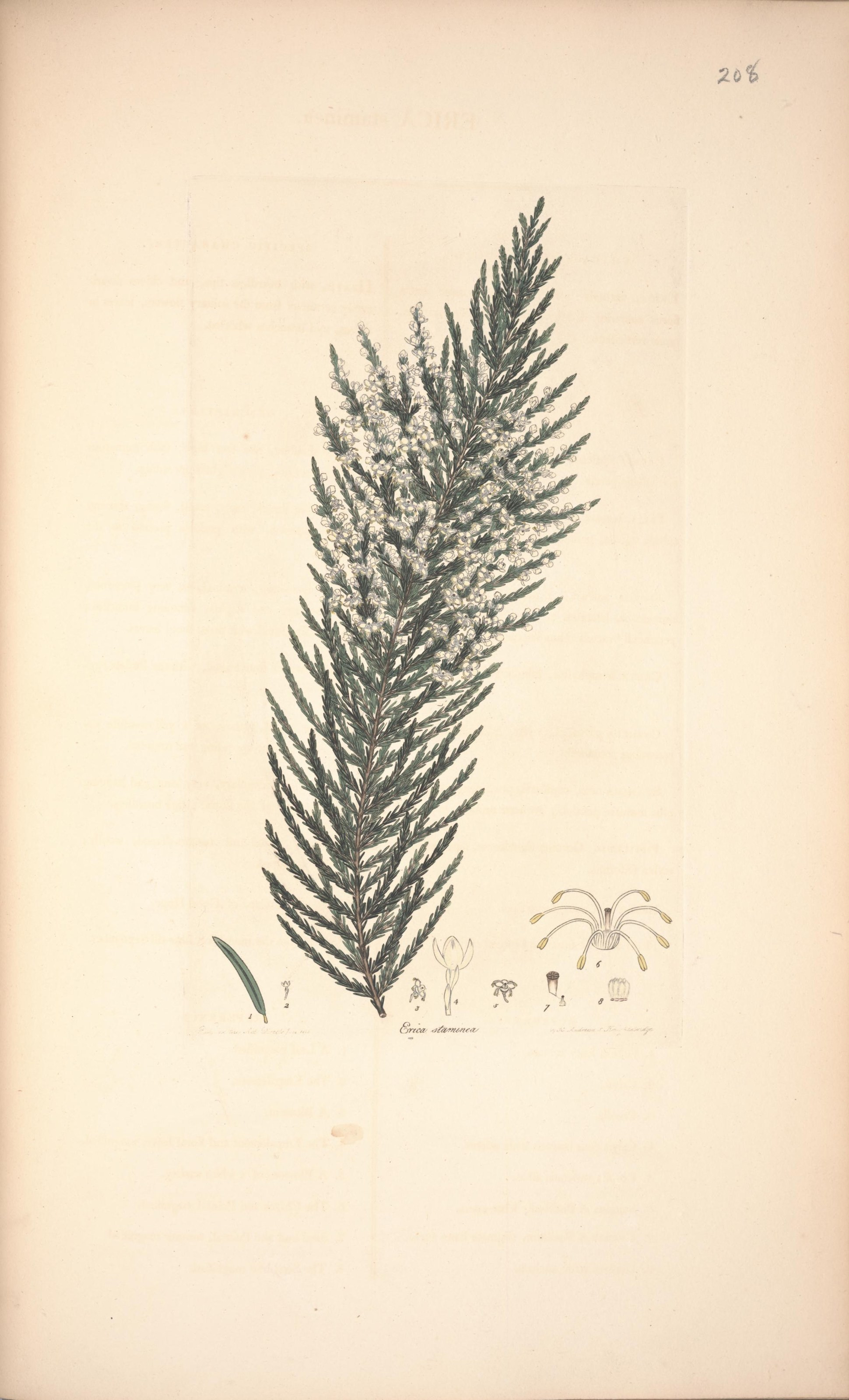

Scientific classification
- Kingdom: Plantae
- Clade: Tracheophytes
- Clade: Angiosperms
- Clade: Eudicots
- Clade: Asterids
- Order: Ericales
- Family: Ericaceae
- Genus: Erica
- Species: E. leucanthera

Binomial name
- Erica leucanthera L.f.

Synonyms
- Erica spiraeiflora Salisb.; Erica staminea Andrews; Ericoides leucantherum (L.f.) Kuntze; Ericoides stamineum (Andrews) Kuntze; Gypsocallis leucanthera (L.f.) G.Don; Gypsocallis staminea (Andrews) G.Don; Gypsocallis thalictriflora (Sinclair) G.Don

= Erica leucanthera =

Species of flowering plant

Erica leucanthera is a plant belonging to the genus Erica and is part of the fynbos. The species is endemic to the Western Cape.
