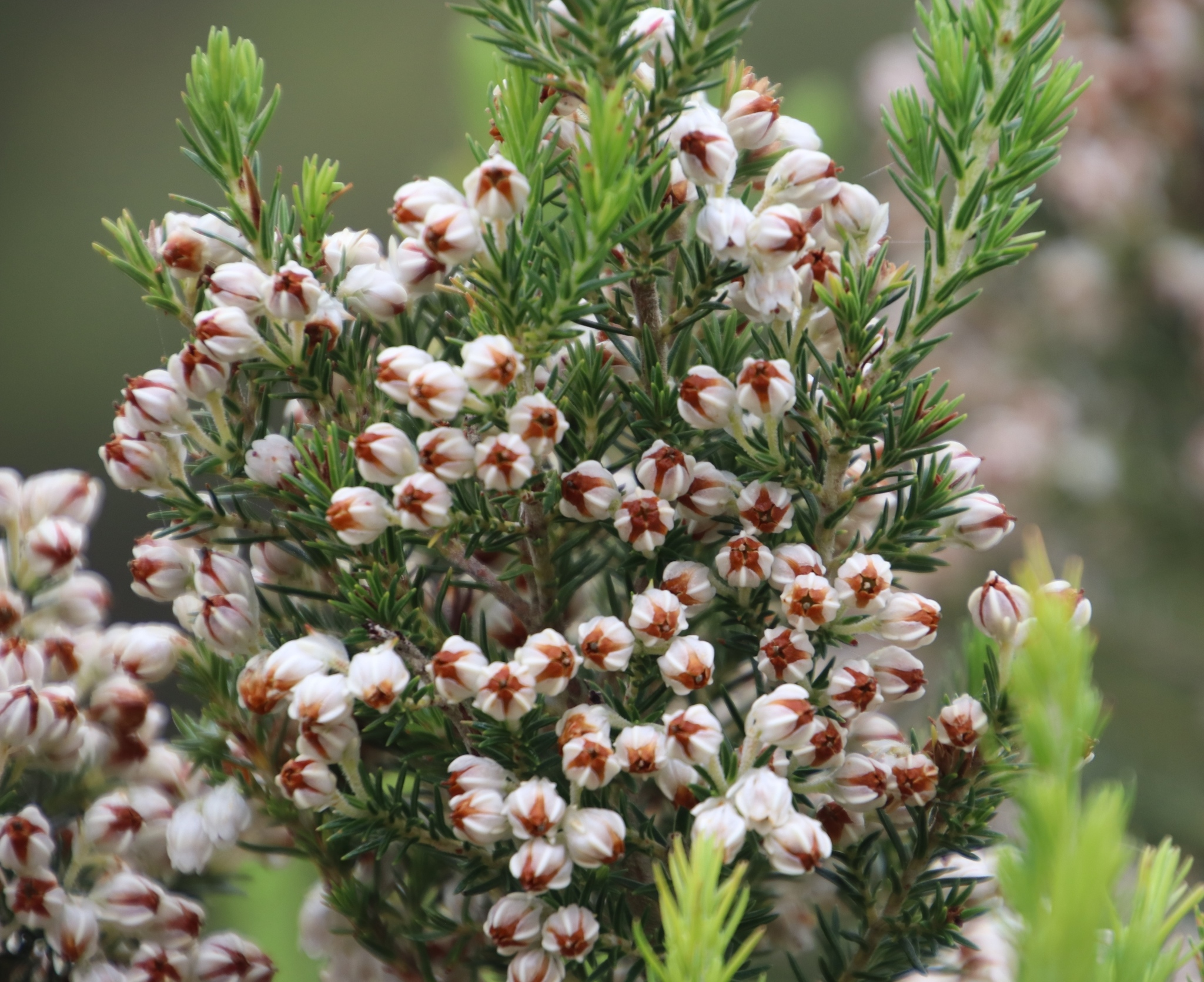

Scientific classification
- Kingdom: Plantae
- Clade: Tracheophytes
- Clade: Angiosperms
- Clade: Eudicots
- Clade: Asterids
- Order: Ericales
- Family: Ericaceae
- Genus: Erica
- Species: E. triflora

Binomial name
- Erica triflora L., (1753)

Synonyms
- Erica arbutiflora J.C.Wendl.; Erica fugax Salisb.; Erica pyroliflora Salisb.; Erica stenoma Tausch; Ericoides triflorum (L.) Kuntze; Eurylepis pyroliflora D.Don; Eurylepis triflora D.Don

= Erica triflora =

Bearded heath

Species of flowering plant

Erica triflora, the bearded heath, is a species of flowering plant in the genus Erica. This species is endemic to Western Cape in South Africa, with some being found in Free State.
