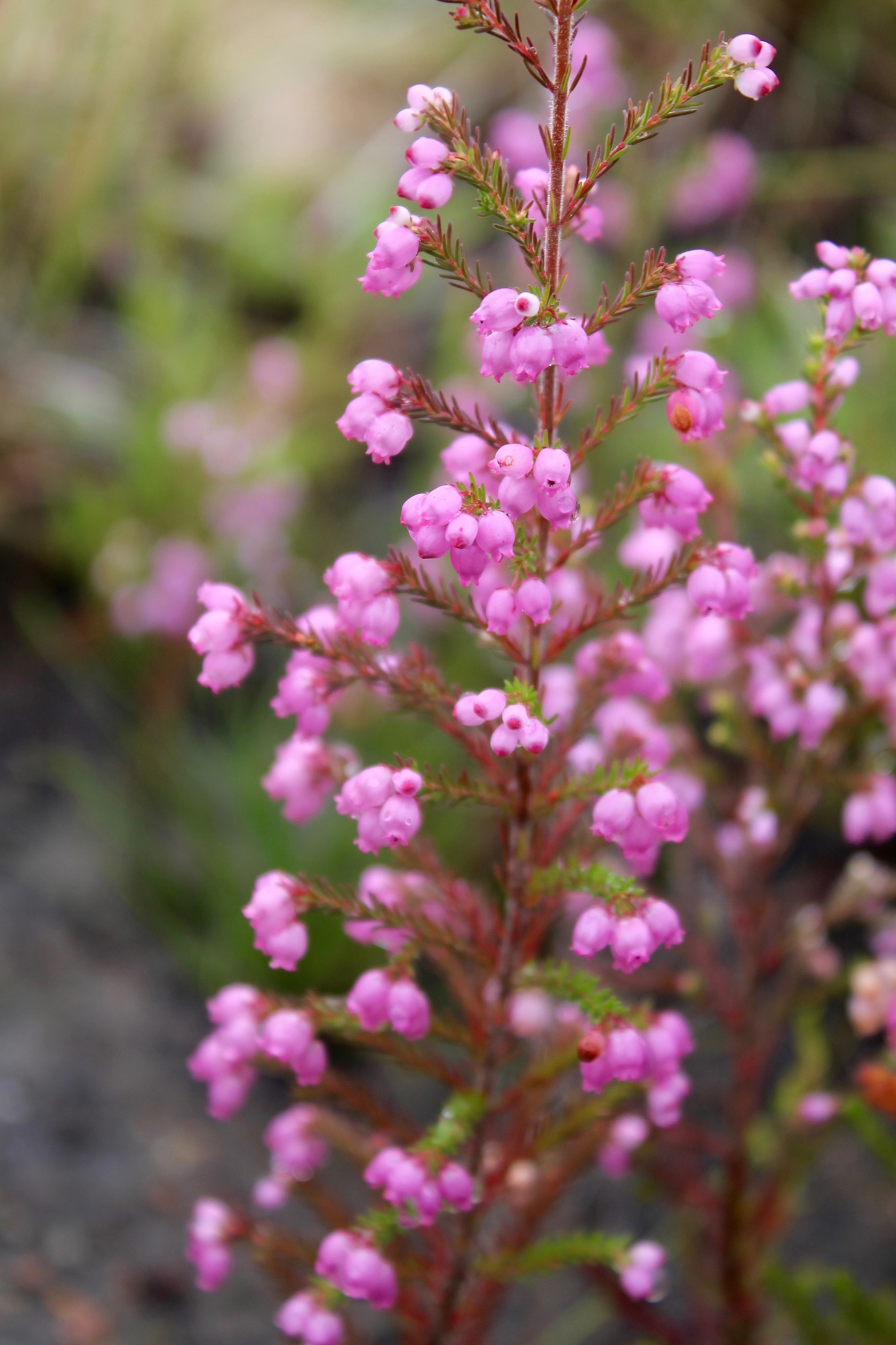

Scientific classification
- Kingdom: Plantae
- Clade: Tracheophytes
- Clade: Angiosperms
- Clade: Eudicots
- Clade: Asterids
- Order: Ericales
- Family: Ericaceae
- Genus: Erica
- Species: E. gracilis

Binomial name
- Erica gracilis J.C.Wendl.

Synonyms
- Erica imbecilla Sweet; Erica neglecta G.Don; Erica tenera Klotzsch ex Benth.; Erica tenuissima J.C.Wendl.; Ericoides tenuissimum Kuntze

= Erica gracilis =

Species of flowering plant

Erica gracilis is a plant belonging to the genus Erica and forming part of the fynbos. The species is endemic to the Western Cape.
