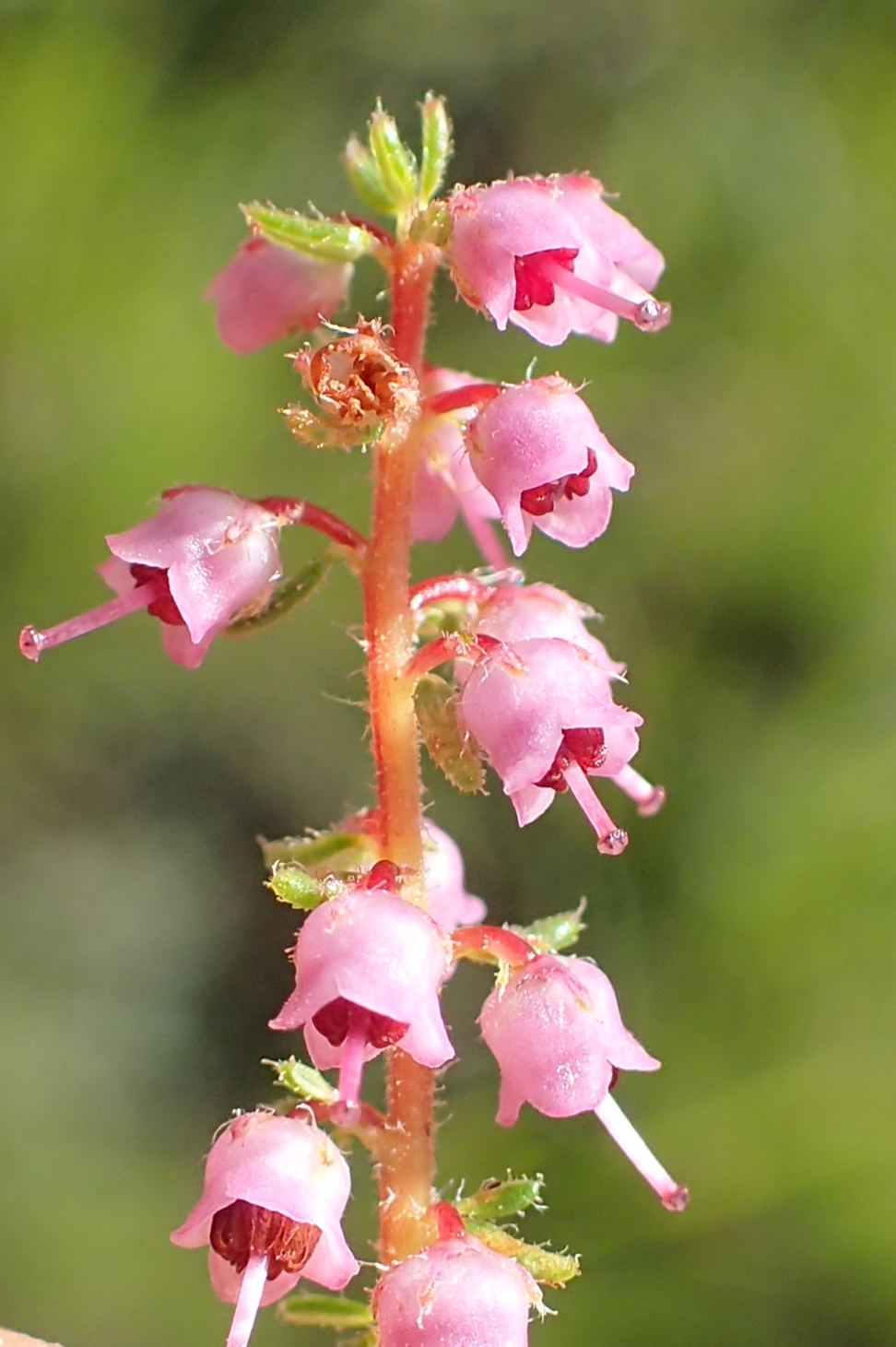

Scientific classification
- Kingdom: Plantae
- Clade: Embryophytes
- Clade: Tracheophytes
- Clade: Spermatophytes
- Clade: Angiosperms
- Clade: Eudicots
- Clade: Asterids
- Order: Ericales
- Family: Ericaceae
- Genus: Erica
- Species: E. aestiva

Binomial name
- Erica aestiva Markötter

= Erica aestiva =

Species of flowering plant

Erica aestiva, the summer heath, is a plant that belongs to the genus Erica. The species is native to KwaZulu-Natal, Lesotho, and the Free State.

The species also has two varieties:

- Erica aestiva var. aestiva
- Erica aestiva var. minor Dulfer
