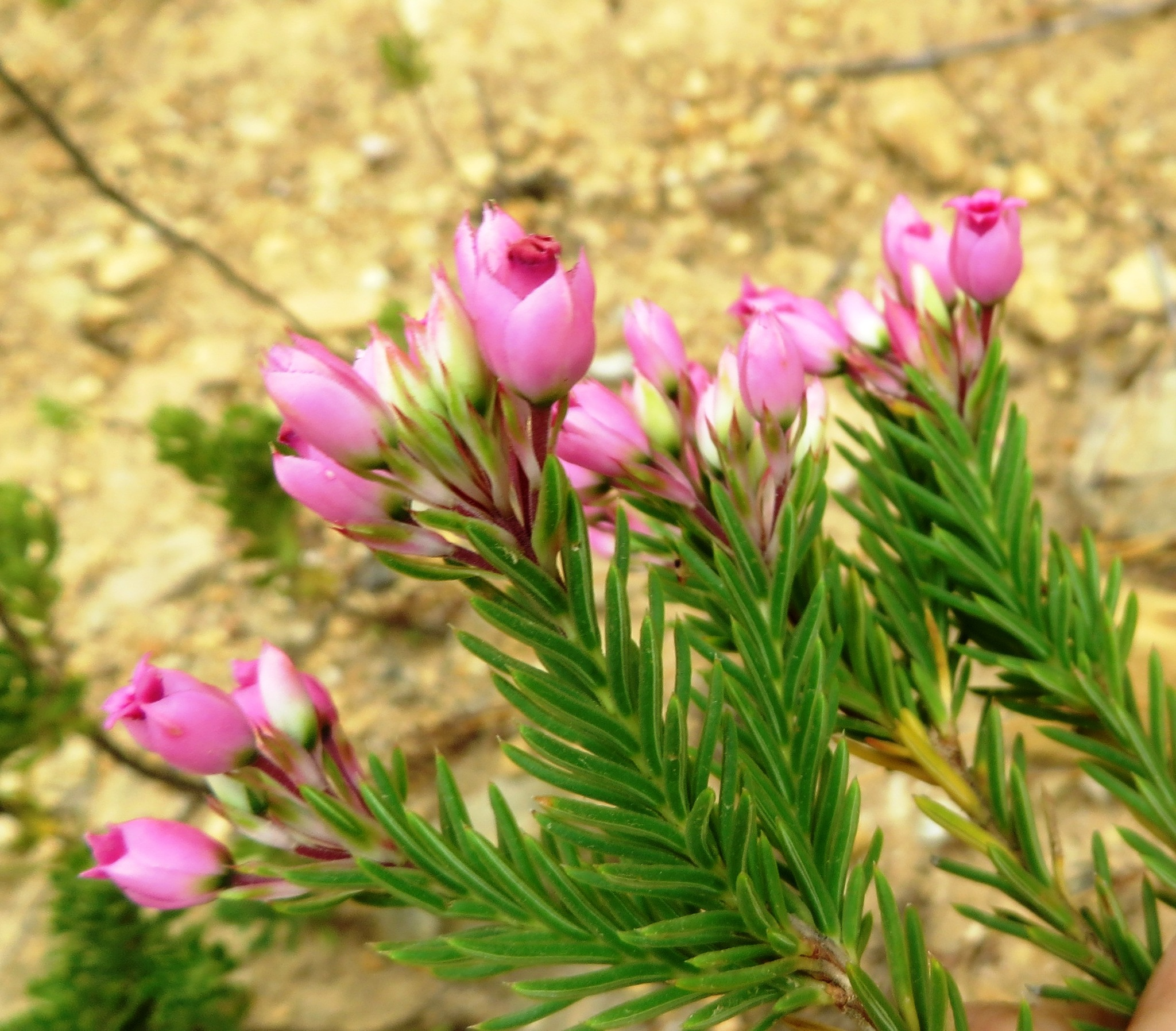

Scientific classification
- Kingdom: Plantae
- Clade: Tracheophytes
- Clade: Angiosperms
- Clade: Eudicots
- Clade: Asterids
- Order: Ericales
- Family: Ericaceae
- Genus: Erica
- Species: E. taxifolia

Binomial name
- Erica taxifolia Dryand.

Synonyms
- Erica juniperifolia Salisb.; Erica turgida Link; Ericoides taxifolium (Dryand.) Kuntze; Lamprotis taxifolia D.Don; Lamprotis turgida G.Don

= Erica taxifolia =

Species of flowering plant

Erica taxifolia, the yew-leaved heath, is a plant belonging to the genus Erica. The species is endemic to the Western Cape.
