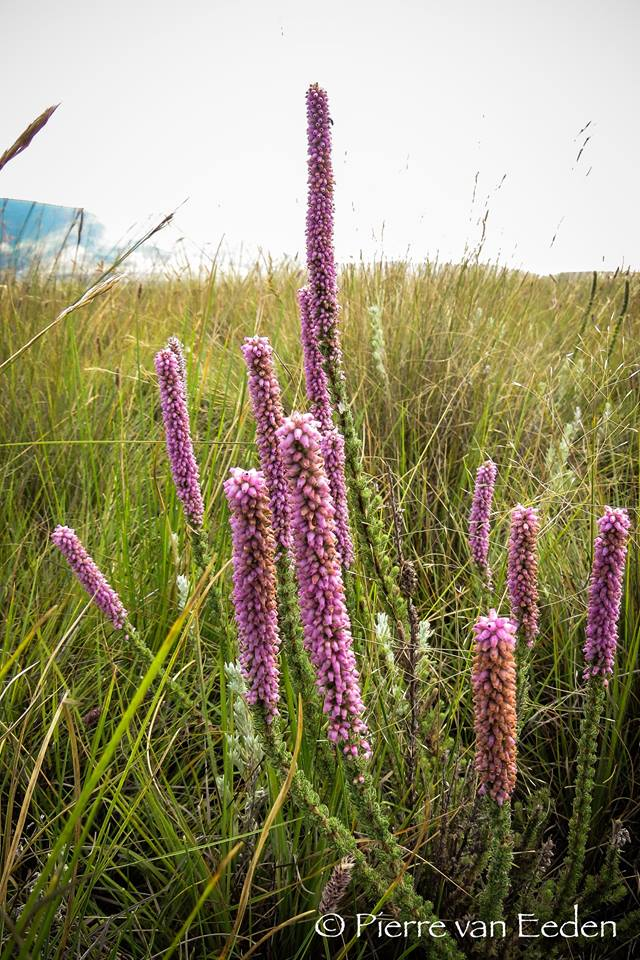

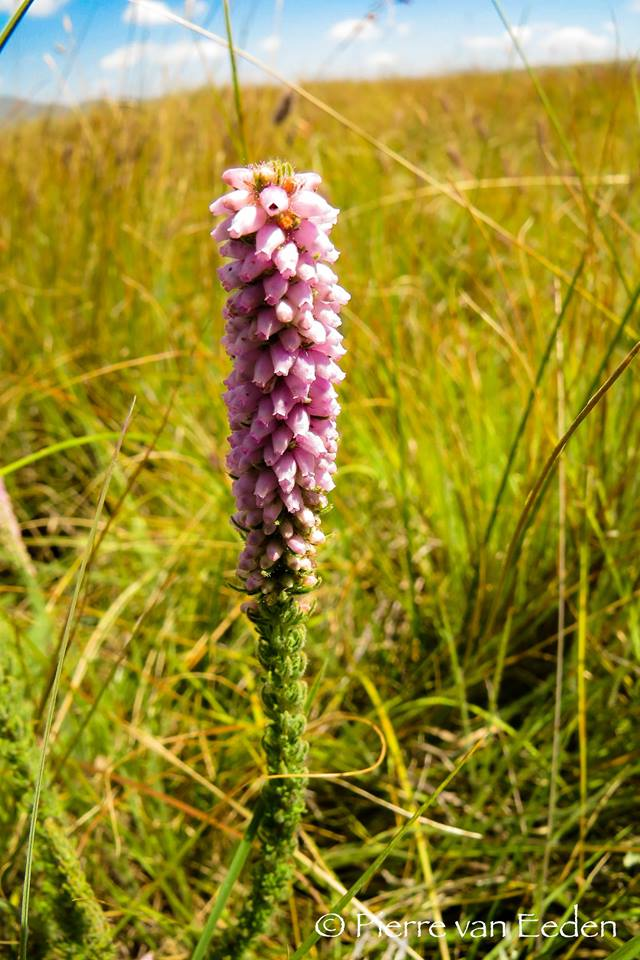

Scientific classification
- Kingdom: Plantae
- Clade: Tracheophytes
- Clade: Angiosperms
- Clade: Eudicots
- Clade: Asterids
- Order: Ericales
- Family: Ericaceae
- Genus: Erica
- Species: E. alopecurus

Binomial name
- Erica alopecurus Harv., (1860)

= Erica alopecurus =

Species of flowering plant

Erica alopecurus, the foxtail heath, is a plant that belongs to the genus Erica and forms part of the fynbos. The species occurs in all the provinces of South Africa as well as Lesotho.
