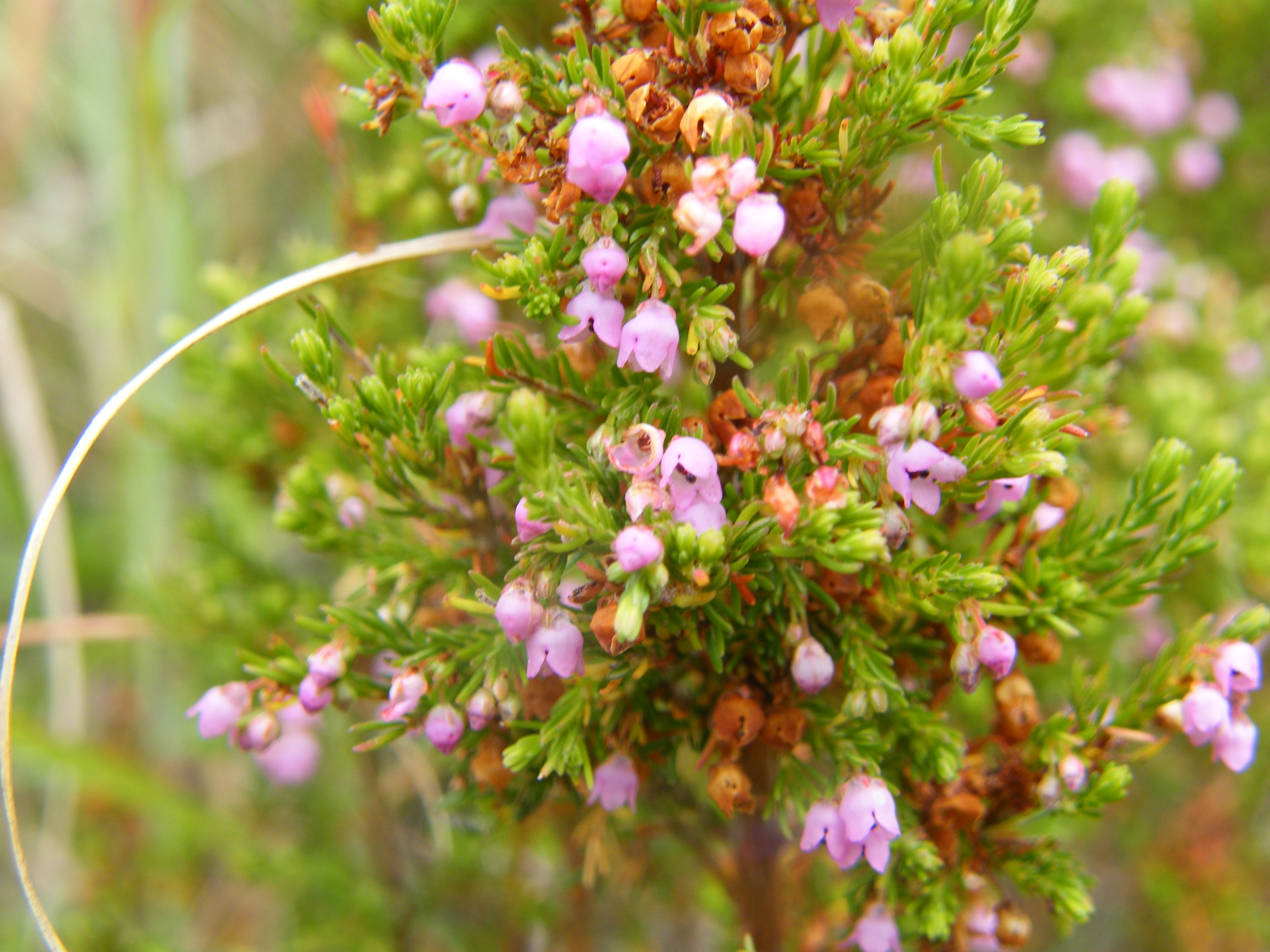

Scientific classification
- Kingdom: Plantae
- Clade: Tracheophytes
- Clade: Angiosperms
- Clade: Eudicots
- Clade: Asterids
- Order: Ericales
- Family: Ericaceae
- Genus: Erica
- Species: E. mauritanica

Binomial name
- Erica mauritanica L., (1759)

Synonyms
- Erica capensis Regel; Erica rhodantha Regel

= Erica mauritanica =

Keyhole Heath

Species of flowering plant

Erica mauritanica, the keyhole heath is a plant that belongs to the genus Erica and is part of the fynbos. The species is endemic to the Western Cape. It is also possible the keyhole heath is in the Eastern Cape.
