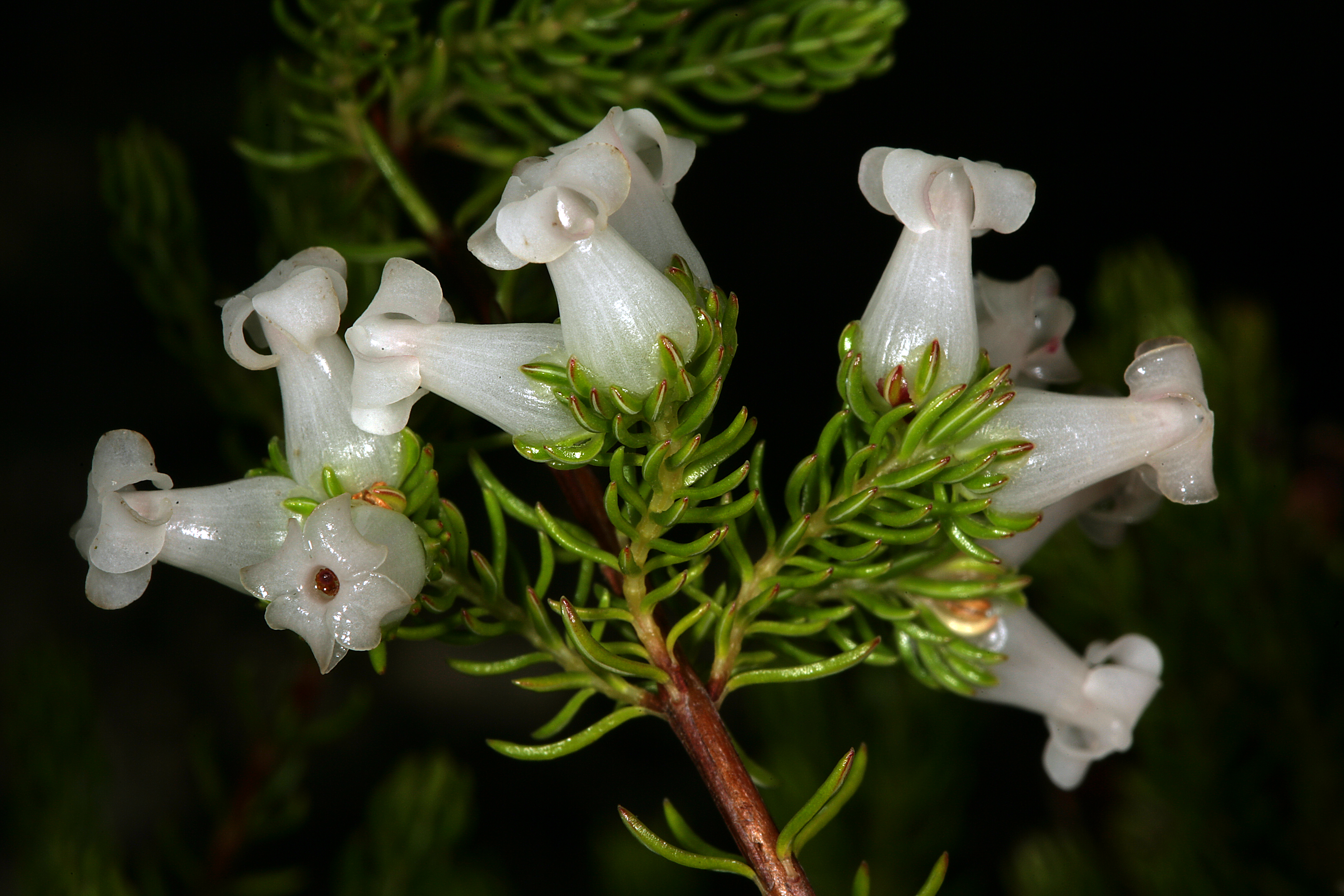

Scientific classification
- Kingdom: Plantae
- Clade: Tracheophytes
- Clade: Angiosperms
- Clade: Eudicots
- Clade: Asterids
- Order: Ericales
- Family: Ericaceae
- Genus: Erica
- Species: E. denticulata

Binomial name
- Erica denticulata L.

Synonyms
- Callista denticulata D.Don; Erica conifera Tausch; Erica dentata Thunb.; Erica denticularis Salisb.; Erica venusta Benth.; Ericoides denticulatum (L.) Kuntze

= Erica denticulata =

Tooth Heath

Species of flowering plant

Erica denticulata, known as the tooth heath, is a plant belonging to the genus Erica and forming part of the fynbos. The species is endemic to the Western Cape.
