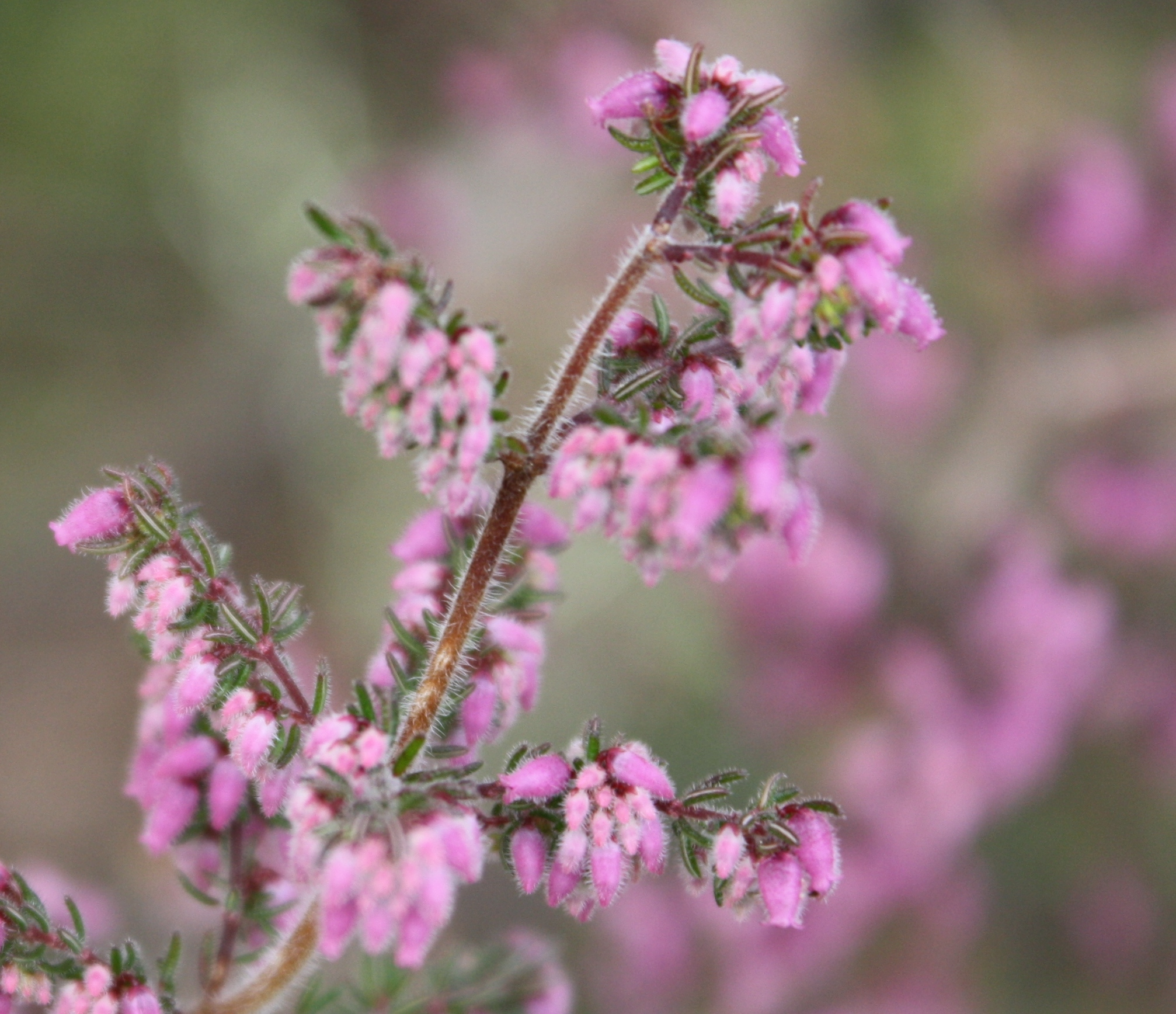

Scientific classification
- Kingdom: Plantae
- Clade: Tracheophytes
- Clade: Angiosperms
- Clade: Eudicots
- Clade: Asterids
- Order: Ericales
- Family: Ericaceae
- Genus: Erica
- Species: E. parviflora

Binomial name
- Erica parviflora L., (1762)

Synonyms
- Erica pubescens Curtis; Erica tardiflora Salisb.; Ericoides parviflorum (L.) Kuntze

= Erica parviflora =

Baby Heath

Species of flowering plant

Erica parviflora, known in English as the baby heath, is a plant belonging to the genus Erica and is part of the fynbos. The species is endemic to the Western Cape.
