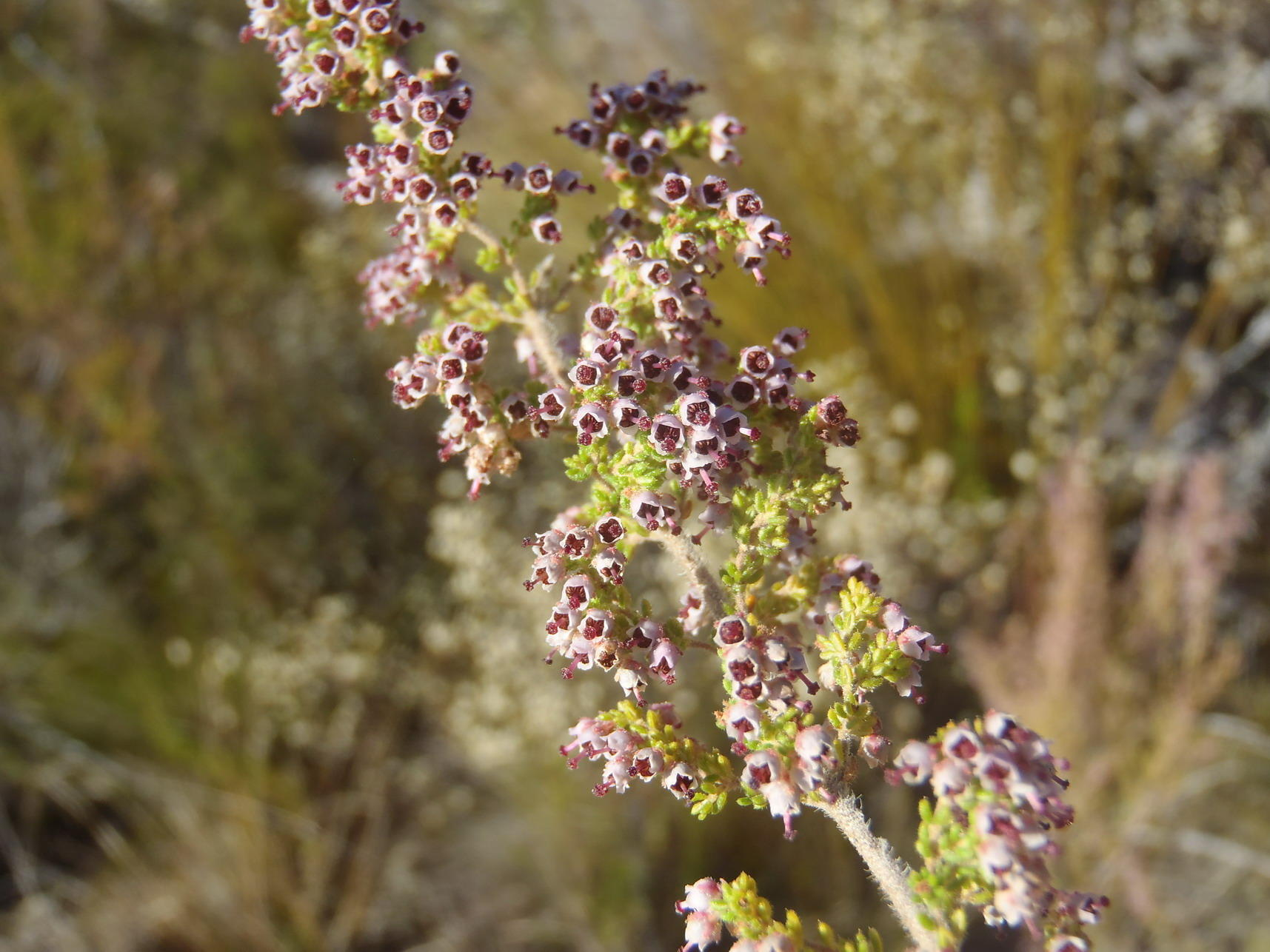

Scientific classification
- Kingdom: Plantae
- Clade: Tracheophytes
- Clade: Angiosperms
- Clade: Eudicots
- Clade: Asterids
- Order: Ericales
- Family: Ericaceae
- Genus: Erica
- Species: E. copiosa

Binomial name
- Erica copiosa J.C.Wendl.

Synonyms
- Erica incomta Klotzsch ex Benth.; Ericoides incomtum (Klotzsch ex Benth.) Kuntze

= Erica copiosa =

Species of flowering plant

Erica copiosa is a plant belonging to the genus Erica and forming part of the fynbos. The species is endemic to the Western Cape.
