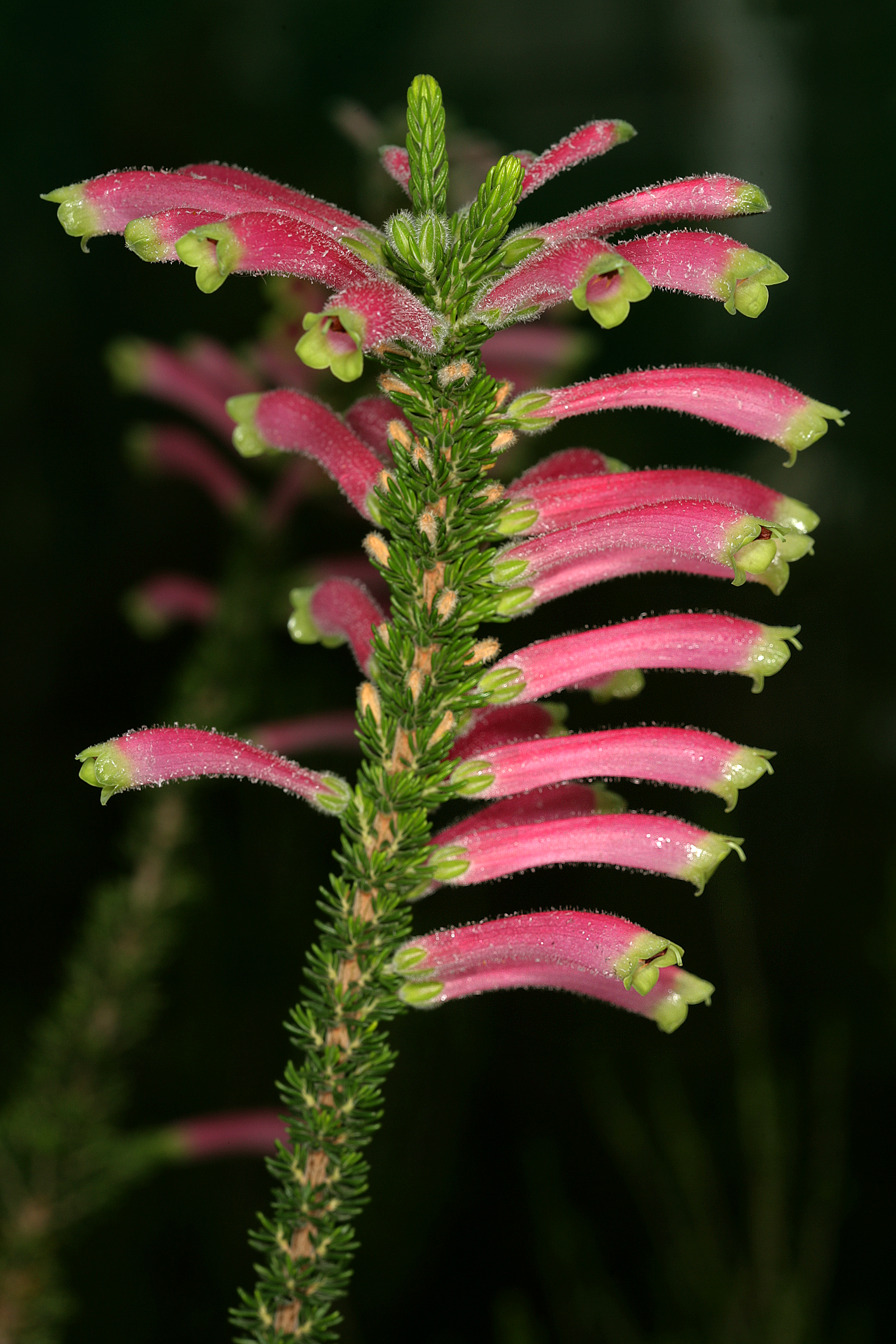

Scientific classification
- Kingdom: Plantae
- Clade: Tracheophytes
- Clade: Angiosperms
- Clade: Eudicots
- Clade: Asterids
- Order: Ericales
- Family: Ericaceae
- Genus: Erica
- Species: E. densifolia

Binomial name
- Erica densifolia Willd., (1799)

Synonyms
- Erica decora Salisb.; Erica uhria Andrews; Ericoides densifolium Kuntze; Syringodea densifolia G.Don; Syringodea ewerana (Dryand.) G.Don

= Erica densifolia =

Species of flowering plant

Erica densifolia is a plant belonging to the genus Erica and forming part of the fynbos. The species is endemic to the Western Cape.
