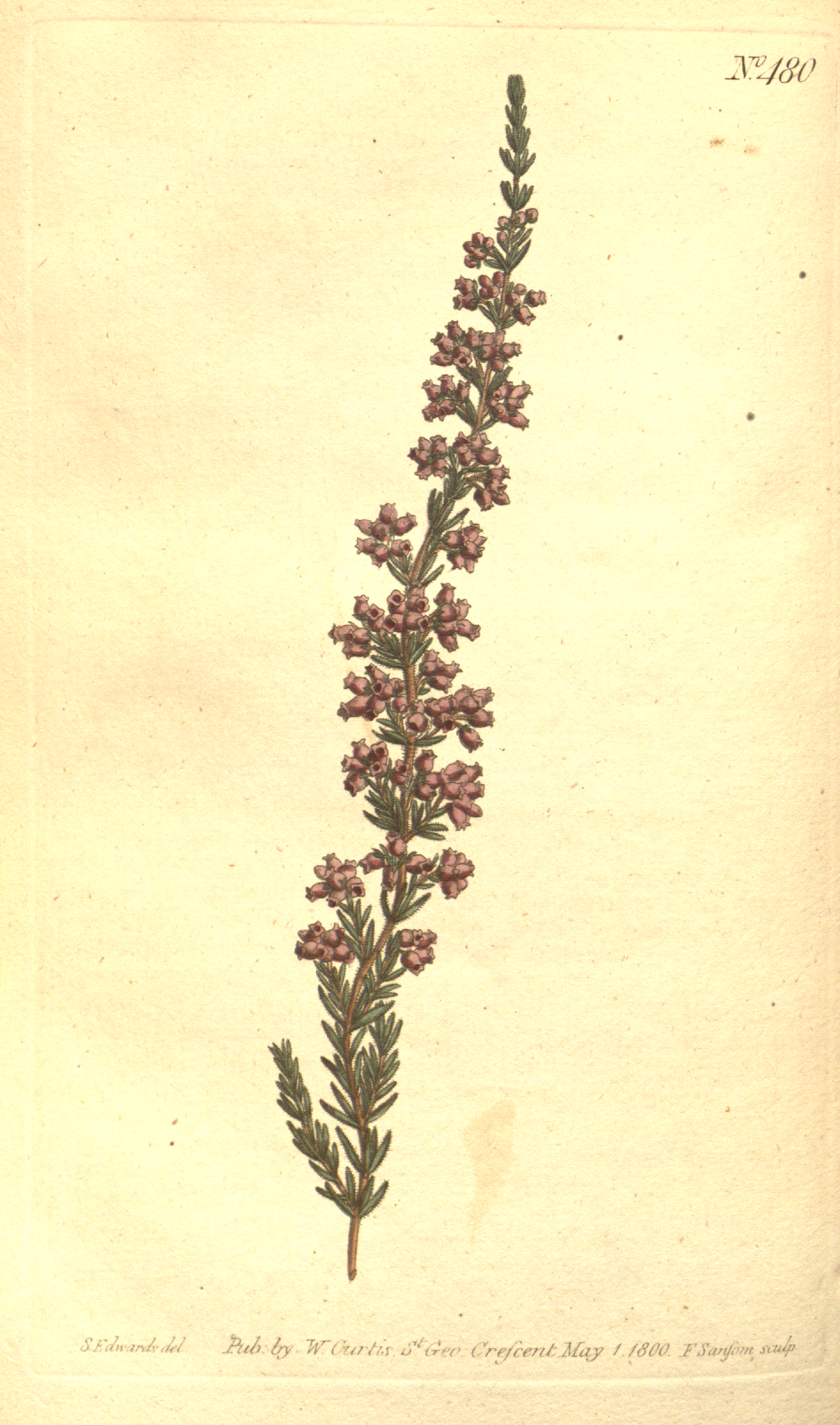

Scientific classification
- Kingdom: Plantae
- Clade: Tracheophytes
- Clade: Angiosperms
- Clade: Eudicots
- Clade: Asterids
- Order: Ericales
- Family: Ericaceae
- Genus: Erica
- Species: E. pubescens

Binomial name
- Erica pubescens L., (1762)

Synonyms
- Erica incana J.C.Wendl.; Erica pallida Salisb.; Ericoides pubescens (L.) Kuntze

= Erica pubescens =

Hairygland Heath

Species of flowering plant

Erica pubescens, the hairygland heath, is a plant belonging to the genus Erica. The species is endemic to the Western Cape.
