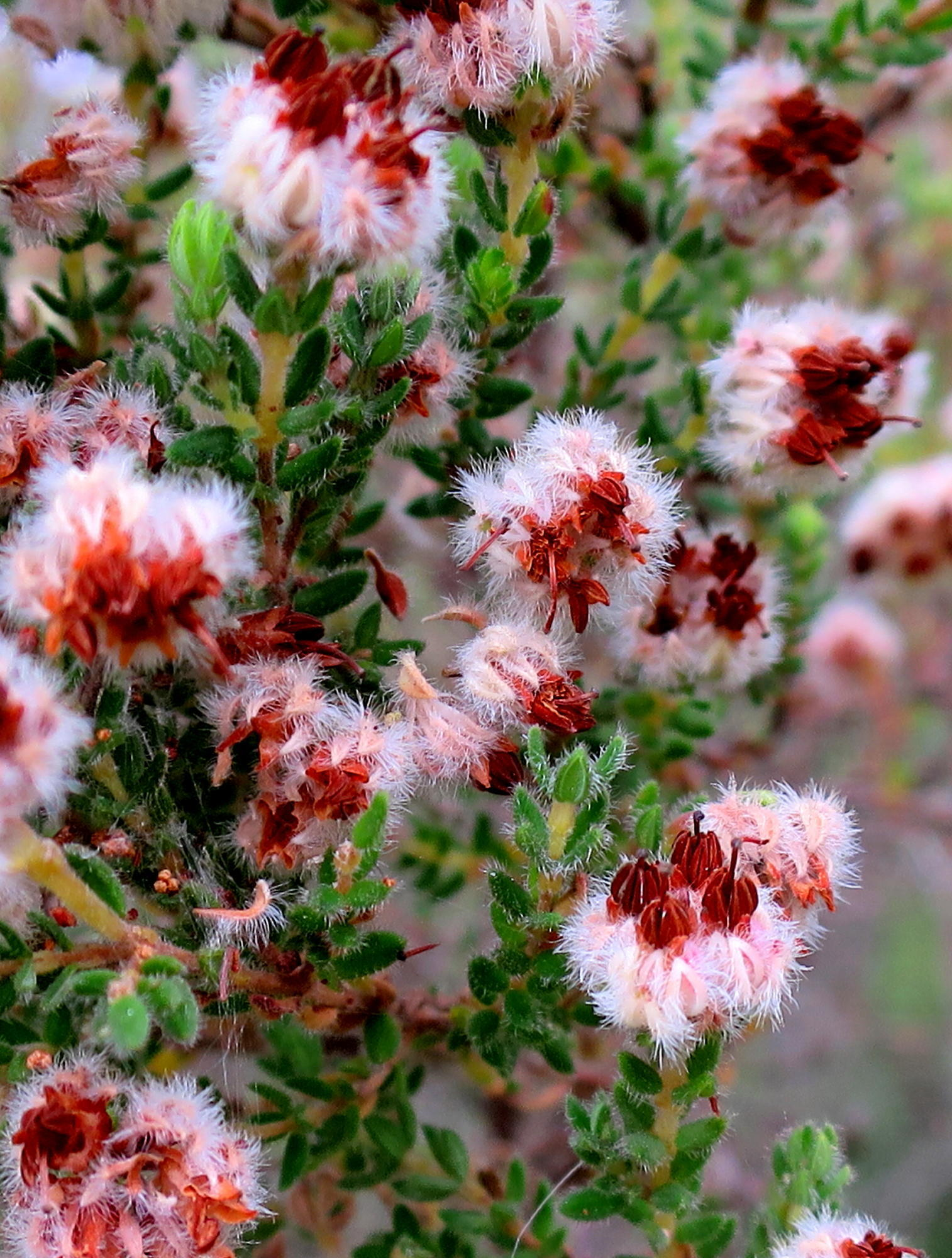

Scientific classification
- Kingdom: Plantae
- Clade: Tracheophytes
- Clade: Angiosperms
- Clade: Eudicots
- Clade: Asterids
- Order: Ericales
- Family: Ericaceae
- Genus: Erica
- Species: E. lanata

Binomial name
- Erica lanata Andrews

Synonyms
- Erica flaccida Enum. Hort. Berol. Alt. 1: 367 (1821)

= Erica lanata =

Species of flowering plant

Erica lanata, also known as Erica flaccida, and known by the common name ivory wool heath, is a plant belonging to the genus Erica and is part of the fynbos. The species is endemic to the Western Cape.
