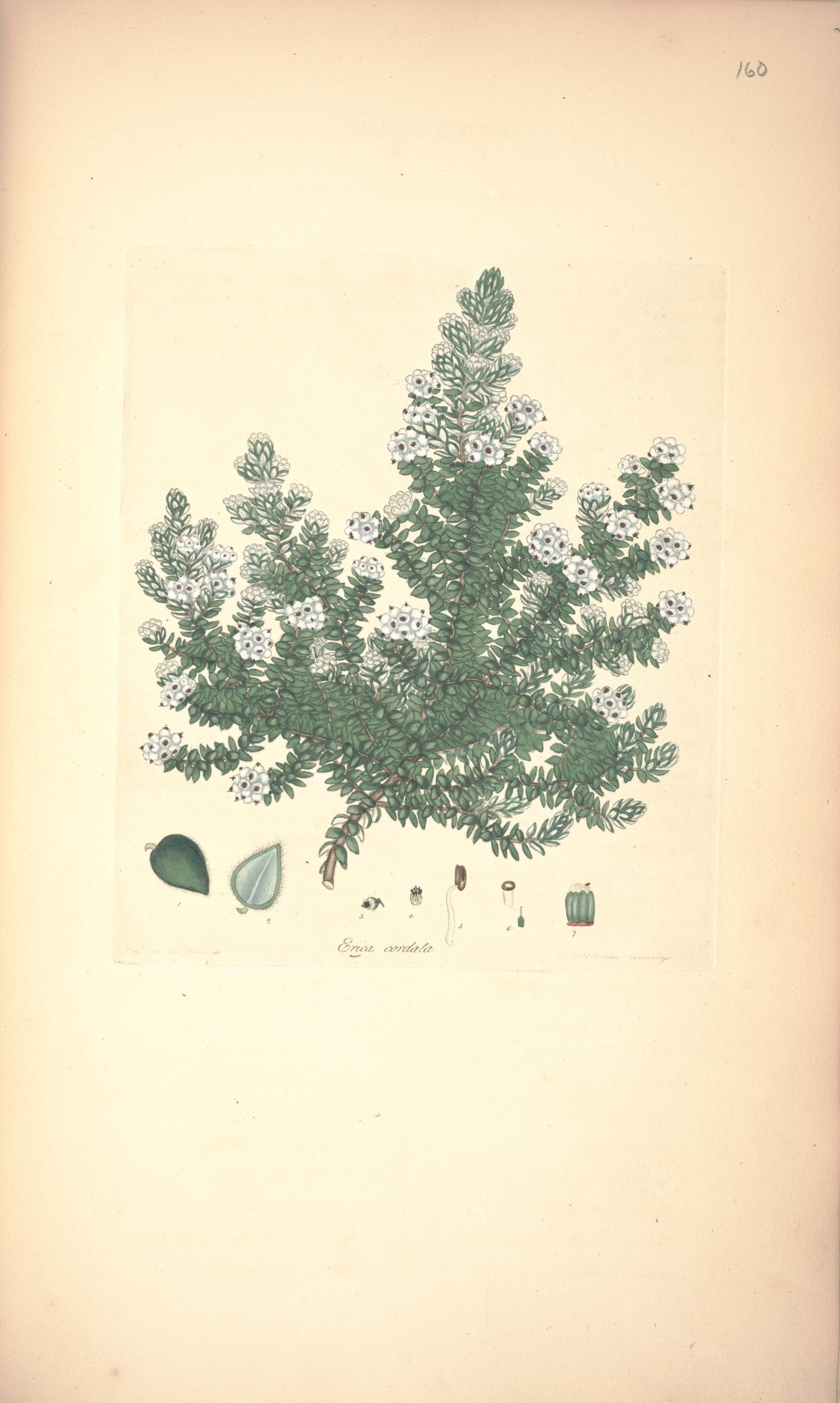

Scientific classification
- Kingdom: Plantae
- Clade: Tracheophytes
- Clade: Angiosperms
- Clade: Eudicots
- Clade: Asterids
- Order: Ericales
- Family: Ericaceae
- Genus: Erica
- Species: E. cordata

Binomial name
- Erica cordata Andrews

Synonyms
- Ceramia cordata G.Don; Erica punctata Bartl.; Ericoides cordatum (Andrews) Kuntze

= Erica cordata =

Species of flowering plant

Erica cordata is a plant that belongs to the genus Erica and forms part of the fynbos. The species is endemic to the Western Cape.
