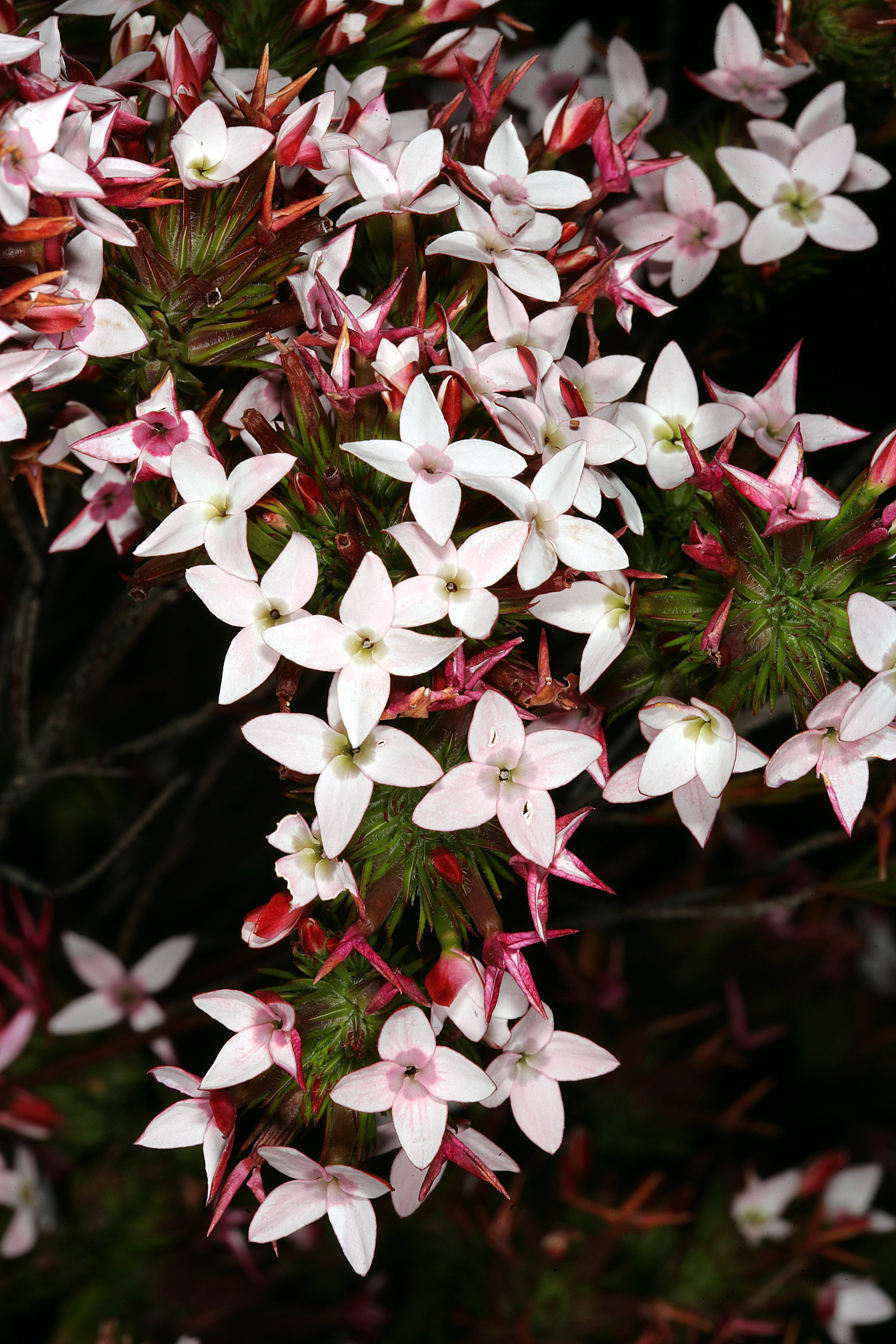

Scientific classification
- Kingdom: Plantae
- Clade: Tracheophytes
- Clade: Angiosperms
- Clade: Eudicots
- Clade: Asterids
- Order: Ericales
- Family: Ericaceae
- Genus: Erica
- Species: E. fastigiata

Binomial name
- Erica fastigiata L., (1767)

Synonyms
- Ericoides fastigiatum (L.) Kuntze

= Erica fastigiata =

Species of flowering plant

Erica fastigiata is a plant belonging to the genus Erica and forming part of the fynbos. The species is endemic to the Western Cape.
