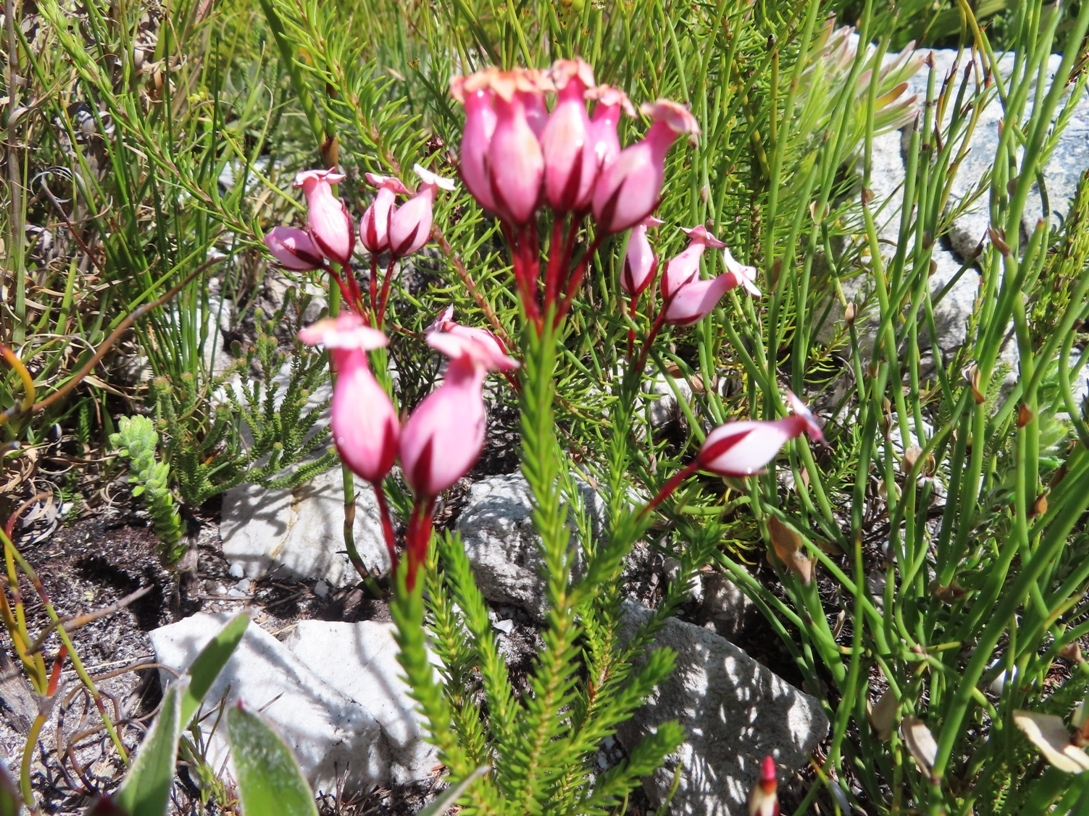

Scientific classification
- Kingdom: Plantae
- Clade: Tracheophytes
- Clade: Angiosperms
- Clade: Eudicots
- Clade: Asterids
- Order: Ericales
- Family: Ericaceae
- Genus: Erica
- Species: E. irbyana

Binomial name
- Erica irbyana Andrews

Synonyms
- Callista bandonia G.Don; Erica bandonia Andrews; Ericoides irbyanum (Andrews) Kuntze; Euryloma irbyana G.Don

= Erica irbyana =

Species of flowering plant

Erica irbyana is a plant belonging to the genus Erica and is part of the fynbos. The species is endemic to the Western Cape.
