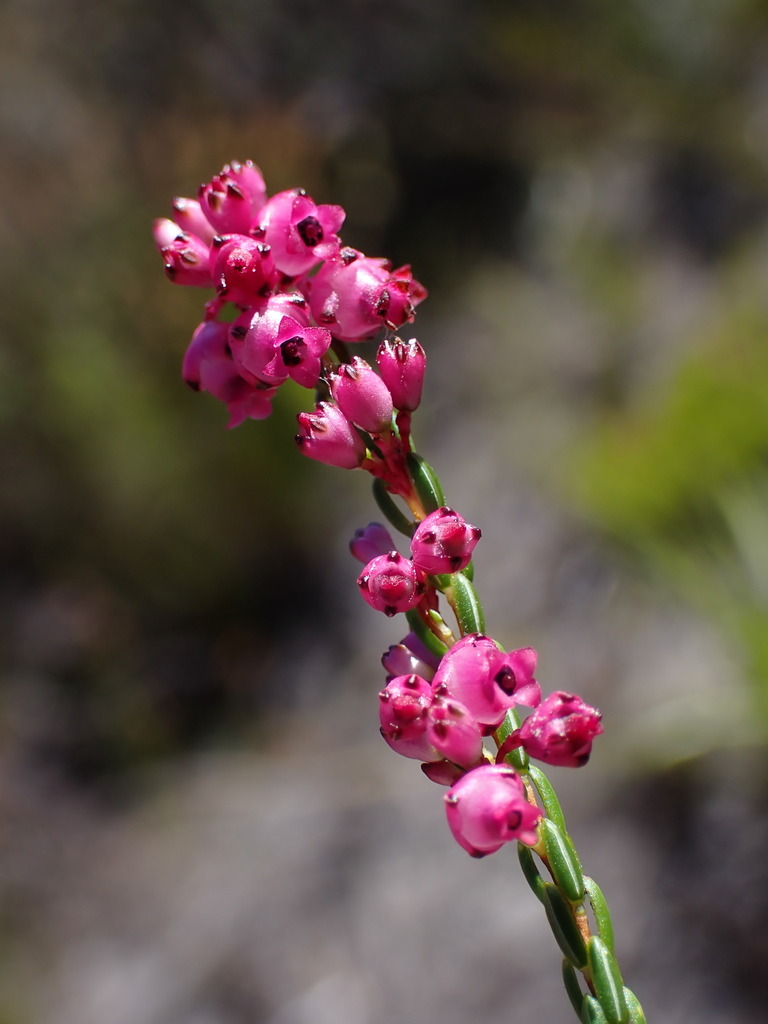

Scientific classification
- Kingdom: Plantae
- Clade: Tracheophytes
- Clade: Angiosperms
- Clade: Eudicots
- Clade: Asterids
- Order: Ericales
- Family: Ericaceae
- Genus: Erica
- Species: E. rhopalantha

Binomial name
- Erica rhopalantha Dulfer

Synonyms
- Erica nodiflora Klotzsch

= Erica rhopalantha =

Species of flowering plant

Erica rhopalantha, also known as the browntip heath or club-shaped erica, is a species of flowering plant within the family Ericaceae. The species is endemic to the Western Cape, where plants grow in sandy well drained soils in full sun. Erica rhopalantha is a completely glabrous plant that possesses an erect growth habit and can reach heights of up to 300mm tall. The leaves of the plant may be opposite or arranged in sets of three, with each leaf being around 2.5 mm in length and linear in shape.
