= Erica bergiana =

Scientific classification
- Kingdom: Plantae
- Clade: Tracheophytes
- Clade: Angiosperms
- Clade: Eudicots
- Clade: Asterids
- Order: Ericales
- Family: Ericaceae
- Genus: Erica
- Species: E. bergiana

Binomial name
- Erica bergiana L.

Synonyms
- Erica bergiana J.C.Wendl.; Erica campylophylla Spreng.; Erica florida Thunb.; Erica incurva Andrews; Erica lacuniflora Salisb.; Erica quadriflora Andrews; Ericoides bergianum (L.) Kuntze; Ericoides floridum (Thunb.) Kuntze; Octopera bergiana D.Don

Species of flowering plant

Erica bergiana is a plant belonging to the genus Erica and forming part of the fynbos. The species is endemic to the Western Cape.
