= Erica perlata =

Scientific classification
- Kingdom: Plantae
- Clade: Tracheophytes
- Clade: Angiosperms
- Clade: Eudicots
- Clade: Asterids
- Order: Ericales
- Family: Ericaceae
- Genus: Erica
- Species: E. perlata

Binomial name
- Erica perlata Sinclair

Synonyms
- Erica barbata Drège ex Benth.; Erica ephemera Tausch; Erica pura G.Lodd.; Ericoides procumbens (G.Lodd.) Kuntze; Gypsocallis procumbens (G.Lodd.) G.Don

Species of flowering plant

Erica perlata is a plant belonging to the genus Erica and is part of the fynbos. The species is endemic to the Western Cape.
