= Erica latifolia =

Scientific classification
- Kingdom: Plantae
- Clade: Tracheophytes
- Clade: Angiosperms
- Clade: Eudicots
- Clade: Asterids
- Order: Ericales
- Family: Ericaceae
- Genus: Erica
- Species: E. latifolia

Binomial name
- Erica latifolia Andrews

Synonyms
- Ceramia latifolia G.Don; Erica crassifolia Klotzsch ex Benth.; Erica suaveolens G.Lodd.; Ericoides latifolium (Andrews) Kuntze

Species of flowering plant

Erica latifolia is a plant that belongs to the genus Erica and is part of the fynbos. The species is endemic to the Western Cape.
