= Erica purgatoriensis =

Scientific classification
- Kingdom: Plantae
- Clade: Tracheophytes
- Clade: Angiosperms
- Clade: Eudicots
- Clade: Asterids
- Order: Ericales
- Family: Ericaceae
- Genus: Erica
- Species: E. purgatoriensis

Binomial name
- Erica purgatoriensis H.A.Baker

Species of plant

Erica purgatoriensis is a species of flowering plant in the heath and heather family Ericaceae, native to the Cape Provinces of South Africa. Known from only one location, a wetland alongside a road, and with around 500 mature individuals occupying an area of about one hectare, it is assessed as Vulnerable.
