= Erica sphaerocephala =

Scientific classification
- Kingdom: Plantae
- Clade: Tracheophytes
- Clade: Angiosperms
- Clade: Eudicots
- Clade: Asterids
- Order: Ericales
- Family: Ericaceae
- Genus: Erica
- Species: E. sphaerocephala

Binomial name
- Erica sphaerocephala J.C.Wendl. ex Benth.

Synonyms
- Ericoides sphaerocephalum (J.C.Wendl. ex Benth.) Kuntze

Species of flowering plant

Erica sphaerocephala is a plant belonging to the genus Erica. The species is endemic to the Western Cape.
