= Erica trichroma =

Scientific classification
- Kingdom: Plantae
- Clade: Tracheophytes
- Clade: Angiosperms
- Clade: Eudicots
- Clade: Asterids
- Order: Ericales
- Family: Ericaceae
- Genus: Erica
- Species: E. trichroma

Binomial name
- Erica trichroma Benth.

Synonyms
- Erica tricolor Niven ex Benth.; Ericoides trichromum (Benth.) Kuntze

Species of flowering plant

Erica trichroma is a plant belonging to the genus Erica. The species is endemic to the Western Cape.
