= Erica lananthera =

Scientific classification
- Kingdom: Plantae
- Clade: Tracheophytes
- Clade: Angiosperms
- Clade: Eudicots
- Clade: Asterids
- Order: Ericales
- Family: Ericaceae
- Genus: Erica
- Species: E. lananthera

Binomial name
- Erica lananthera L.Bolus

Species of flowering plant

Erica lananthera is a plant belonging to the genus Erica and is part of the fynbos and the species is endemic to the Western Cape.
