= Erica intonsa =

Scientific classification
- Kingdom: Plantae
- Clade: Tracheophytes
- Clade: Angiosperms
- Clade: Eudicots
- Clade: Asterids
- Order: Ericales
- Family: Ericaceae
- Genus: Erica
- Species: E. intonsa

Binomial name
- Erica intonsa L.Bolus

Species of flowering plant

Erica intonsa is a plant belonging to the genus Erica. The species is endemic to the Western Cape.
