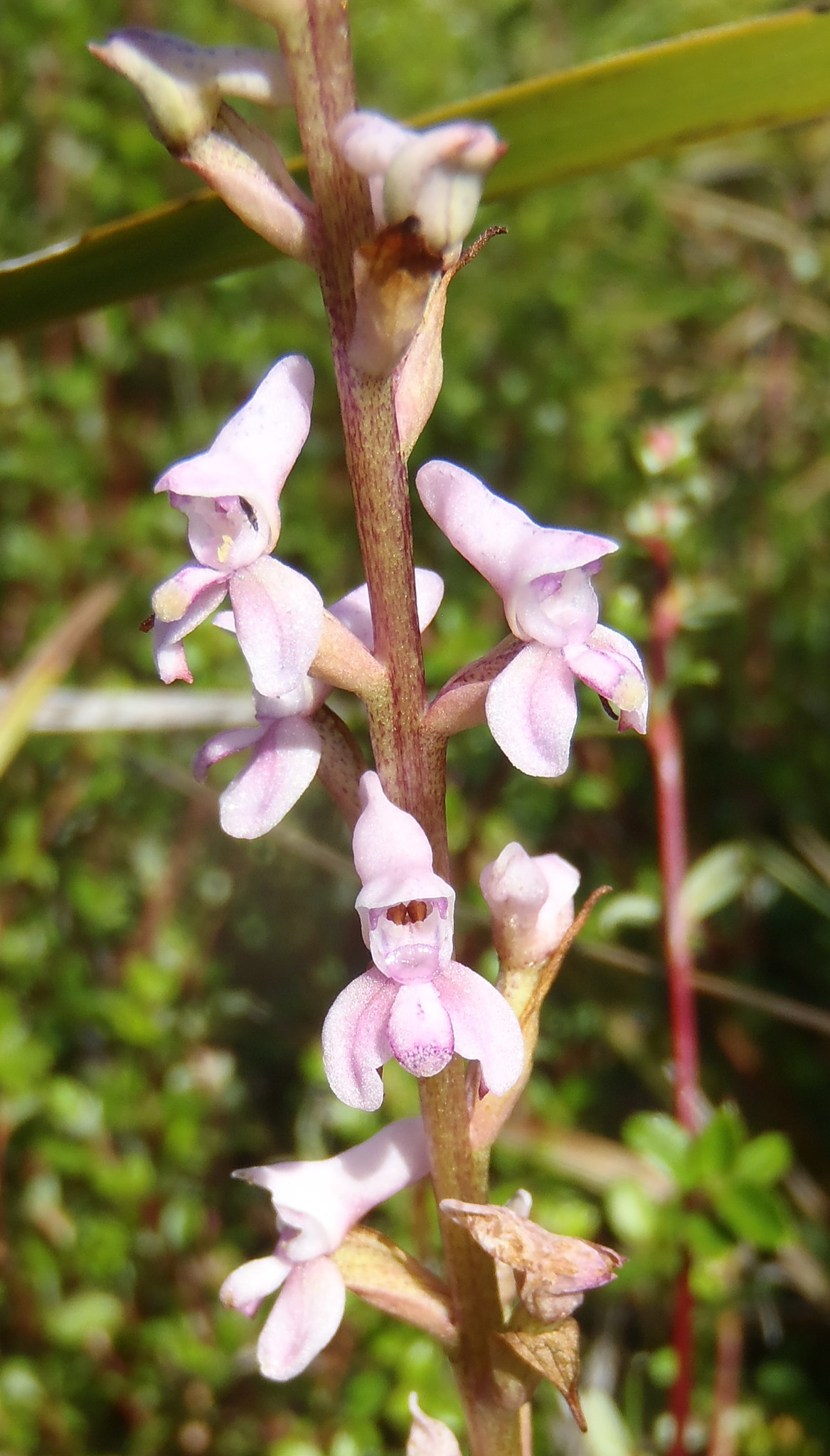

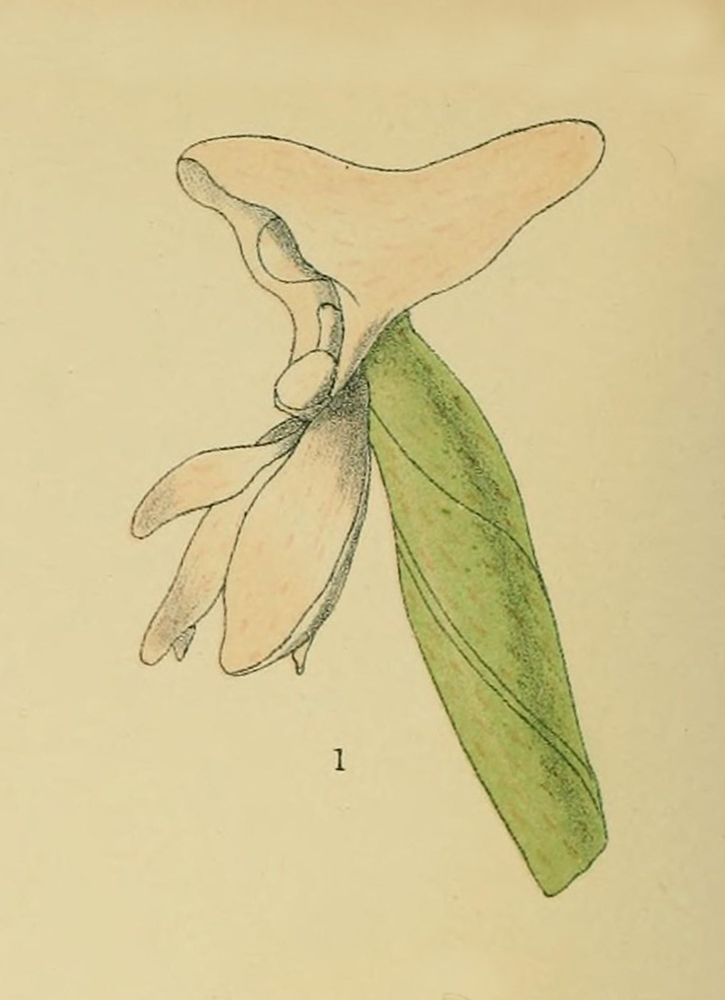

Scientific classification
- Kingdom: Plantae
- Clade: Tracheophytes
- Clade: Angiosperms
- Clade: Monocots
- Order: Asparagales
- Family: Orchidaceae
- Subfamily: Orchidoideae
- Genus: Disa
- Species: D. aconitoides

Binomial name
- Disa aconitoides Sond.

= Disa aconitoides =

Species of flowering plant

Disa aconitoides, the wolfsbane Disa or Oumakappie, is a perennial plant and geophyte belonging to the genus Disa.
