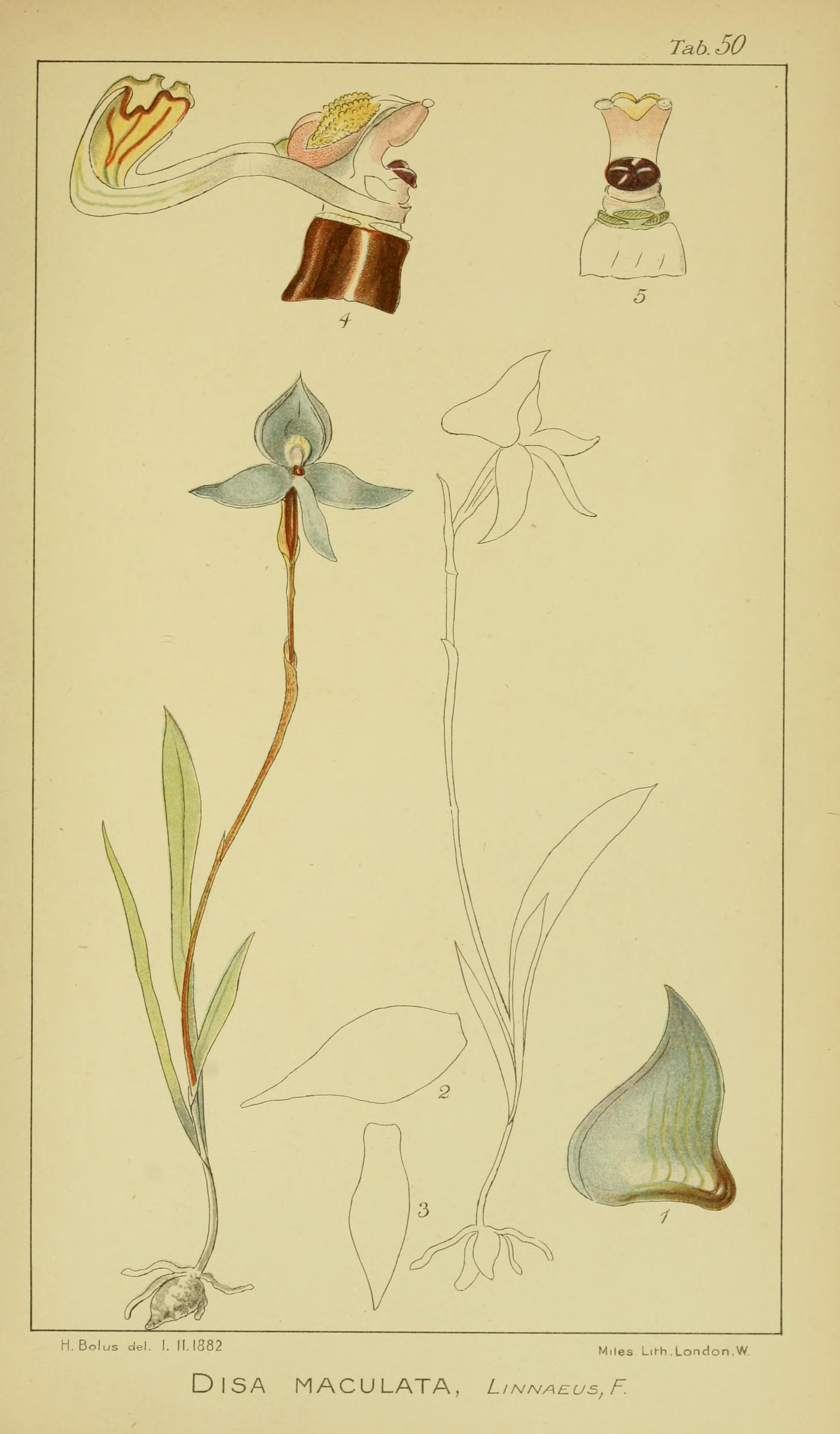

Scientific classification
- Kingdom: Plantae
- Clade: Tracheophytes
- Clade: Angiosperms
- Clade: Monocots
- Order: Asparagales
- Family: Orchidaceae
- Subfamily: Orchidoideae
- Genus: Disa
- Species: D. maculata

Binomial name
- Disa maculata L.f.

Synonyms
- Schizodium maculatum (L.f.) Lindl.

= Disa maculata =

Species of flowering plant

Disa maculata is a perennial plant and geophyte belonging to the genus Disa and is part of the fynbos. The plant is endemic to the Western Cape.
