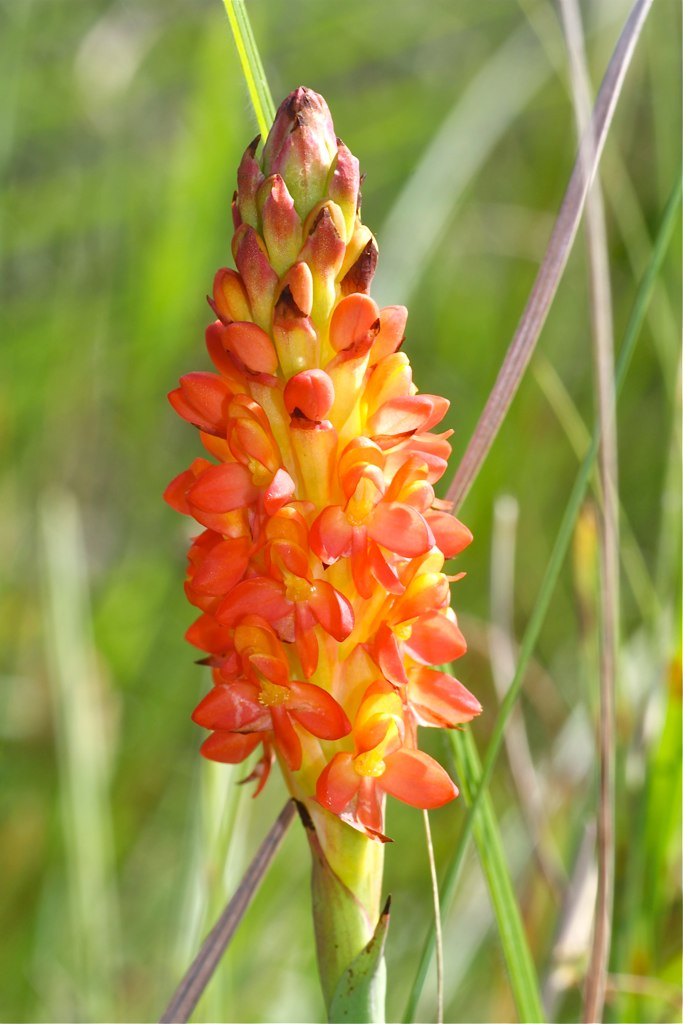

Scientific classification
- Kingdom: Plantae
- Clade: Tracheophytes
- Clade: Angiosperms
- Clade: Monocots
- Order: Asparagales
- Family: Orchidaceae
- Subfamily: Orchidoideae
- Genus: Disa
- Species: D. polygonoides

Binomial name
- Disa polygonoides Lindl.

Synonyms
- Disa natalensis Lindl.

= Disa polygonoides =

Species of flowering plant

Disa polygonoides is a perennial plant and geophyte belonging to the genus Disa. The plant is native to Eswatini, Gauteng, KwaZulu-Natal, Limpopo, Mozambique, Mpumalanga, North West and the Eastern Cape.
