= Disa hircicornis =

Scientific classification
- Kingdom: Plantae
- Clade: Tracheophytes
- Clade: Angiosperms
- Clade: Monocots
- Order: Asparagales
- Family: Orchidaceae
- Subfamily: Orchidoideae
- Genus: Disa
- Species: D. hircicornis

Binomial name
- Disa hircicornis Rendle

Synonyms
- Disa amblyopetala Schltr.; Disa culveri Schltr.; Disa laeta Rchb.f.

Species of flowering plant

Disa hircicornis is a perennial plant and geophyte belonging to the genus Disa. In South Africa, the species occurs in KwaZulu-Natal, Limpopo and Mpumalanga. In Africa, the plant occurs in Angola, Burundi, Democratic Republic of the Congo, Ethiopia, Cameroon, Kenya, Malawi, Mozambique, Niger, Nigeria, Rwanda, Sudan, Tanzania, Uganda, Zambia and Zimbabwe.
